= Parliamentary constituencies in Devon =

The ceremonial county of Devon (which includes the unitary authorities of Torbay and Plymouth) is divided into 13 Parliamentary constituencies: 4 Borough constituencies and 9 County constituencies, one of which crosses the county boundary with Somerset.

== Constituencies ==
In the 2024 United Kingdom general election, Devon elected the following MPs:

† Conservative ‡ Labour ¤ Liberal Democrat

Constituency (Note: BC denotes borough constituency, CC denotes county constituency.)	Electorate	Majority	Member of Parliament	Nearest opposition	Map
Central Devon	75,385	61	Mel Stride†	Ollie Pearson‡	
Exeter	67,840	11,937	Steve Race‡	Tessa Tucker†	
Exmouth and Exeter East	79,983	121	David Reed†	Helen Dallimore‡	
Honiton and Sidmouth	75,537	6,700	Richard Foord¤	Simon Jupp†	
Newton Abbot	73,885	2,246	Martin Wrigley¤	Anne-Marie Morris†	
North Devon	79,068	6,744	Ian Roome¤	Selaine Saxby†	
Plymouth Moor View	74,724	5,604	Fred Thomas‡	Johnny Mercer†	
Plymouth Sutton and Devonport	75,313	13,328	Luke Pollard‡	Peter Gold (Reform UK)	
South Devon	70,755	7,127	Caroline Voaden¤	Anthony Mangnall†	
South West Devon	77,600	2,112	Rebecca Smith†	Sarah Allen‡	
Torbay	76,179	5,349	Steve Darling¤	Kevin Foster†	
Torridge and Tavistock	74,727	3,950	Geoffrey Cox†	Phil Hutty¤	
Tiverton and Minehead (part)	71,843	3,507	Rachel Gilmour¤	Ian Liddell-Grainger†	

== 2024 boundary changes ==
See 2023 Periodic Review of Westminster constituencies for further details.

Former name
1. Central Devon CC
2. East Devon CC
3. Exeter BC
4. Newton Abbot CC
5. North Devon CC
6. Plymouth Moor View BC
7. Plymouth Sutton and Devonport BC
8. South West Devon CC
9. Tiverton and Honiton CC
10. Torbay BC
11. Torridge and West Devon CC
12. Totnes CC
Boundaries 2010–2024

2010-2024 constituencies in Devon

Current name
1. Central Devon CC
2. Exeter BC
3. Exmouth and Exeter East CC
4. Honiton and Sidmouth CC
5. Newton Abbot CC
6. North Devon CC
7. Plymouth Moor View BC
8. Plymouth Sutton and Devonport BC
9. South Devon CC
10. South West Devon CC
11. Tiverton and Minehead CC
12. Torbay BC
13. Torridge and Tavistock CC
Boundaries 2024–present

Constituencies in Devon since 2024

For the 2023 Periodic Review of Westminster constituencies, which redrew the constituency map ahead of the 2024 United Kingdom general election, the Boundary Commission for England opted to combine Devon with Avon and Somerset as a sub-region of the South West Region, resulting in significant change to the existing pattern of constituencies. In Devon, East Devon, and Tiverton and Honiton were abolished, being replaced by Exmouth and Exeter East, Honiton and Sidmouth, and the cross-county boundary constituency of Tiverton and Minehead. Torridge and West Devon and Totnes were renamed Torridge and Tavistock, and South Devon respectively, despite only minor boundary changes to each.

The following seats resulted from the boundary review:

Containing electoral wards from East Devon

- Exmouth and Exeter East (part)
- Honiton and Sidmouth (part)

Containing electoral wards from Exeter

- Exeter
- Exmouth and Exeter East (part)

Containing electoral wards from Mid Devon

- Central Devon (part)
- Honiton and Sidmouth (part)
- Tiverton and Minehead (part in the Somerset District of Somerset West and Taunton)

Containing electoral wards from North Devon

- North Devon

Containing electoral wards from Plymouth

- Plymouth Moor View
- Plymouth Sutton and Devonport
- South West Devon (part)

Containing electoral wards from South Hams

- South West Devon (part)
- South Devon (part)

Containing electoral wards from Teignbridge

- Central Devon (part)
- Newton Abbot

Containing electoral wards from Torbay

- Torbay
- South Devon (part)

Containing electoral wards from Torridge

- Torridge and Tavistock (part)

Containing electoral wards from West Devon

- Central Devon (part)
- South West Devon (part)
- Torridge and Tavistock (part)

== Results history ==
Primary data source: House of Commons research briefing - General election results from 1918 to 2019

=== 2024 ===
Party	Votes	%	Change from 2019	Seats	Change from 2019
Conservative	165,316	28.7%	▼25.2%	4	▼6
Liberal Democrats	143,624	24.9%	▲10.2%	5	▲5
Labour	135,300	23.5%	▲0.7%	3	▲1
Reform	85,711	14.9%	▲14.9%	0	0
Greens	41,036	7.1%	▲3.8%	0	0
Others	4,690	0.8%	▼3.8%	0	0
Total	575,677	100.0		12	

=== 2019 ===
The number of votes cast for each political party who fielded candidates in constituencies comprising Devon in the 2019 general election were as follows:

Party	Votes	%	Change from 2017	Seats	Change from 2017
Conservative	355,052	53.9%	▲2.8%	10	0
Labour	150,169	22.8%	▼6.2%	2	0
Liberal Democrats	96,809	14.7%	▲2.2%	0	0
Greens	22,004	3.3%	▲1.3%	0	0
Brexit	4,337	0.7%	new	0	0
Others	30,836	4.6%	▼0.8%	0	0
Total	659,207	100.0		12	

=== Percentage votes ===
Election year	1924	1929	1945	1950	1951	1955	1959	1964	1966	1970	1974 (Feb)	1974 (Oct)	1979	1983	1987	1992	1997	2001	2005	2010	2015	2017	2019
Conservative^{1}	52.3	43.0	49.3	50.3	55.8	55.3	52.9	47.6	47.5	52.8	45.5	45.0	43.9	52.8	49.5	47.6	36.8	39.0	38.1	43.3	46.2	51.1	53.9
Labour	13.7	16.3	34.1	34.1	36.5	33.3	27.6	26.9	32.8	29.4	21.8	24.9	22.1	11.1	13.1	19.2	25.9	23.6	20.4	14.2	18.0	29.0	22.8
Liberal Democrat^{2}	34.0	36.4	16.2	15.6	7.7	11.3	19.5	25.5	19.6	17.8	32.6	29.9	22.8	35.4	36.6	30.3	31.3	31.9	32.7	33.4	13.2	12.5	14.7
Green Party	-	-	-	-	-	-	-	-	-	-	-	-	-	-	*	*	*	*	*	1.6	5.6	2.0	3.3
UKIP	-	-	-	-	-	-	-	-	-	-	-	-	-	-	-	-	*	*	*	6.1	14.6	1.7	*
Brexit Party	-	-	-	-	-	-	-	-	-	-	-	-	-	-	-	-	-	-	-	-	-	-	0.7
Other	-	4.2	0.4	0.1	-	-	-	-	-	-	0.1	0.2	1.2	0.7	0.9	2.9	6.1	5.5	8.8	1.3	2.3	3.7	4.6

^{1}Includes National Liberal Party up to 1966 and one National candidate in 1945

^{2}pre-1979 - Liberal; 1983 & 1987 - SDP–Liberal Alliance

* Included in Other

Meaningful vote percentages are not available for the elections of 1918, 1922, 1923, 1931 and 1935 since at least one seat was gained unopposed.

=== Seats ===
Election year	1950	1951	1955	1959	1964	1966	1970	1974 (Feb)	1974 (Oct)	1979	1983	1987	1992	1997	2001	2005	2010	2015	2017	2019
Conservative^{1}	8	9	10	9	9	7	8	8	8	9	10	10	9	5	4	5	8	11	10	10
Labour	2	1	0	0	0	2	1	1	1	1	0	0	1	3	3	3	2	1	2	2
Liberal Democrat^{2}	0	0	0	1	1	1	1	1	1	0	1	1	1	3	4	3	2	0	0	0
Total	10	10	10	10	10	10	10	10	10	10	11	11	11	11	11	11	12	12	12	12

^{1}Includes National Liberal Party up to 1966

^{2}1950-1979 - Liberal; 1983 & 1987 - SDP–Liberal Alliance

=== Maps ===
==== 1885-1910 ====
1885

1886

1892

1895

1900

1906

Jan 1910

Dec 1910

==== 1918-1945 ====
1918

1922

1923

1924

1929

1931

1935

1945

==== 1950-1979 ====
1950

1951

1955

1959

1964

1966

1970

1974 Feb

1974 Oct

1979

==== 1983-present ====
1983

1987

1992

1997

2001

2005

2010

2015

2017

2019

2024

== Historical results by party ==
A cell marked → (with a different colour background to the preceding cell) indicates that the previous MP continued to sit under a new party name.

=== 1885 to 1906 (13 MPs) ===
Conservative Liberal Liberal Unionist

Constituency	1885	1886	91	1892	1895	98	99	00	1900	02	04
Ashburton	Seale-Hayne										Eve
Barnstaple	Pitt-Lewis	→		Billson	Gull				Soares		
Devonport (two MPs)	Puleston			Morton						Lockie	J. Benn
Devonport (two MPs)	Price			Kearley							
Exeter	Northcote						Vincent				
Honiton	Kennaway										
Plymouth (two MPs)	Clarke							Guest			→
Plymouth (two MPs)	Bates			Pearce	Harrison	Mendl			Duke		
South Molton	Wallop	→	Lambert								
Tavistock	Fortescue	→		Luttrell					Spear		
Tiverton	Walrond										
Torquay	McIver	Mallock			Philpotts				Layland-Barratt		
Totnes	Mildmay	→									

=== 1906 to 1918 (13 MPs) ===
Conservative Liberal Liberal Unionist

Constituency	1906	08	Jan 1910	Dec 1910	11	12	15	18
Ashburton	Eve	Morrison-Bell	Buxton	Morrison-Bell		→		
Barnstaple	Soares				Baring			
Devonport (two MPs)	J. Benn		Jackson					
Devonport (two MPs)	Kearley		Kinloch-Cooke					
Exeter	Kekewich		Duke	St Maur	Duke			Newman
Honiton	Kennaway		Morrison-Bell					
Plymouth (two MPs)	Dobson		Williams	W. Astor				
Plymouth (two MPs)	Mallet			A. Benn				
South Molton	Lambert							
Tavistock	Luttrell			Spear				
Tiverton	Walrond jnr						Carew	
Torquay	Layland-Barratt			Burn		→		
Totnes	→					→		

=== 1918 to 1950 (11 MPs) ===
Coalition Liberal (1918-22) / National Liberal (1922-23) Common Wealth Conservative Independent Conservative Independent National Labour Liberal National Liberal (1931-68)

Constituency	1918	19	1922	23	1923	1924	28	1929	31	1931	1935	37	42	1945
Barnstaple	Rees		B. Peto		Rees	B. Peto					R. Dyke Acland		→	C. Peto
Exeter	Newman							→		Reed				Maude
Honiton	Morrison-Bell									Drewe				
Plymouth Devonport	Kinloch-Cooke				Hore-Belisha				→				→	Foot
Plymouth Drake	A. Benn							Moses		F. Guest		C. Guest		Medland
Plymouth Sutton	W. Astor	N. Astor												Middleton
South Molton	Lambert		→			Drewe		Lambert	→					Lambert jnr
Tavistock	Williams		Thornton			Kenyon-Slaney	Wright			Patrick			Studholme	
Tiverton	Carew		Sparkes	F. Dyke Acland		Acland-Troyte								Heathcoat-Amory
Torquay	Burn				Thompson	Williams								
Totnes	Mildmay		Harvey		Vivian	Harvey					Rayner			

=== 1950 to 1983 (10 MPs) ===
Conservative Labour Liberal National Liberal (1931-68) Social Democratic

Constituency	1950	1951	1955	55	58	1959	60	1964	1966	67	1970	Feb 74	Oct 74	1979	81
Tavistock	Studholme								Heseltine						
Devon North	C. Peto		Lindsay			Thorpe								Speller	
Exeter	Maude	Dudley-Williams							Dunwoody		Hannam				
Honiton	Drewe		Mathew							Emery					
Plymouth Devonport	Foot		Vickers					→				Owen			→
Plymouth Sutton	Middleton	J. Astor				Fraser			Owen			Clark			
Tiverton	Heathcoat-Amory						Maxwell-Hyslop								
Torquay / Torbay (1974)	Williams			Bennett											
Torrington / Devon West (1974)	Lambert jnr				Bonham-Carter	Browne		Mills							
Totnes	Rayner		Mawby												
Plymouth Drake												Fookes			

=== 1983 to 2010 (11 MPs) ===
Conservative Independent Labour Liberal Democrats Social Democratic (1983-88) / Social Democratic Party (1988-90)

Constituency	1983	1987	90	1992	95	1997	2001	2005
Plymouth Drake	Fookes							
Devon North	Speller			Harvey				
Devon West and Torridge	Mills	Nicholson			→	Burnett		Cox
Exeter	Hannam					Bradshaw		
Honiton (1983–97) / East Devon (1997)	Emery						Swire	
Plymouth Devonport	Owen		→	Jamieson				Seabeck
Plymouth Sutton	Clark			Streeter		Gilroy		
South Hams (1983–97) / Totnes (1997)	Steen							
Teignbridge	Nicholls						Younger-Ross	
Tiverton (1983–97) / Tiverton & Honiton (1997)	Maxwell-Hyslop			Browning				
Torbay	Bennett	Allason				Sanders		
South West Devon						Streeter		

=== 2010 to present (12 MPs) ===
Change UK Conservative Independent Labour Liberal Democrats

Constituency	2010	2015	2017	17	17	19		2019	22		2024
Central Devon	Stride										
Devon North	Harvey	Heaton-Jones						Saxby			Roome
Devon W & Torridge (2010–24) / Torridge & Tavistock (2024)	Cox										
East Devon (2010–24) / Exmouth & Exeter East (2024)	Swire							Jupp			Reed
Exeter	Bradshaw										Race
Newton Abbot	Morris			→	→				→	→	Wrigley
Plymouth Moor View	Seabeck	Mercer									Thomas
Plymouth Sutton & Devonport	Colvile		Pollard								
South West Devon	Streeter										Smith
Tiverton & Honiton^{1} / Honiton & Sidmouth (2024)	Parish								→	Foord	
Torbay	Sanders	Foster									Darling
Totnes (2010–24) / South Devon (2024)	Wollaston					→	→	Mangnall			Voaden

^{1}parts transferred in 2024 to Tiverton and Minehead which is mostly in Somerset

== See also ==
- List of constituencies in South West England
