= Ian Forbes-Leith =

Scottish landowner and soldier (1902–1973)

Sir Ian Forbes-Leith Bt KT MBE JP

Personal details
- Born: 27 December 1902
- Died: 17 March 1973 (aged 70)

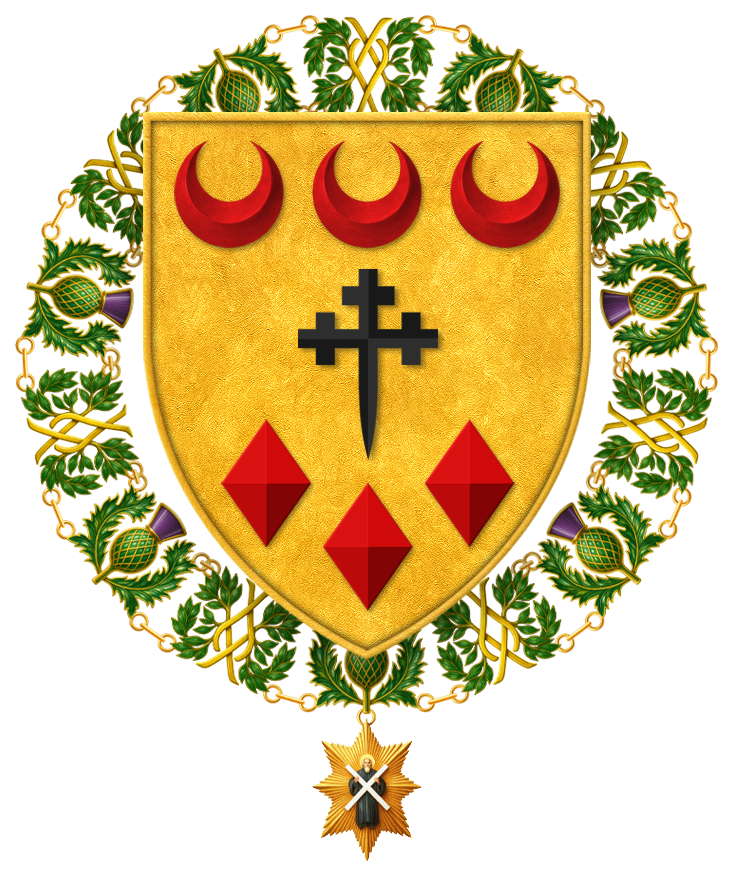
Shield of Arms of Sir Robert Ian Algernon Forbes-Leith, 2nd Baronet of Jessfield, KT, MBE, JP

Sir Robert Ian Algernon Forbes-Leith, 2nd Baronet (27 December 1902 – 17 March 1973) was a Scottish landowner and soldier who served as Lord Lieutenant of Aberdeenshire.

== Early life ==
Forbes-Leith was born Robert Ian Algernon Burn, on 27 December 1902, the youngest child of Sir Charles Burn, 1st Bt. and his wife the Hon. Ethel Louise Forbes-Leith, daughter of Alexander Forbes-Leith, 1st Baron Leith of Fyvie. When Forbes-Leith was aged 23 in 1925, his father changed his name from Burn to Forbes-Leith on the death of the 1st Baron Leith and the inheritance of his estates, including Fyvie Castle. Forbes-Leith was educated at Eton College followed by the Royal Military College, Sandhurst, from which he was commissioned as a Second Lieutenant into the Royal Artillery. His father died in 1930 and Forbes-Leith inherited his lands and the family title, the Forbes-Leith baronetcy of Fyvie, of Jessfield.

== Career ==
Following his succession to the family baronetcy, Forbes-Leith was admitted to the Royal Company of Archers and was also appointed Justice of the Peace and Deputy Lieutenant of Aberdeenshire.

Forbes-Leith served during the Second World War and was mentioned in despatches during his service with the Royal Artillery. Also during the war he was created Member of the Order of the British Empire for his services. Following the war, Forbes-Leith rose to and retired on the rank of Major.

Following his retirement from the Army, he was appointed a Deputy Lieutenant of Aberdeenshire in 1946 and Vice-Lieutenant of Aberdeenshire in 1953, a position which he held until he took over as Lord Lieutenant of Aberdeenshire on 29 January 1959. In 1964 he was also appointed Deputy lieutenant of the City of Aberdeen and was awarded an Honorary Doctorate from the University of Aberdeen. On St Andrew's Day 1972, Forbes-Leith was appointed a knight of the Order of the Thistle.

== Family ==
Forbes-Leith married Ruth Avis Barnett, daughter of George Edward Barnett and Amy Emma Browne, on 23 February 1927 at St Margaret's, Westminster, London, England, they had four children together:

- John Alexander Forbes-Leith (31 August 1928 – 25 September 1949)
- Sir Andrew George Forbes-Leith of Fyvie, 3rd Bt. (20 October 1929 – 4 November 2000)
- Anne Rosdew Forbes-Leith (10 April 1932 – 11 April 2021)
- Mary Elizabeth Forbes-Leith (14 Sep 1934 – 2 Dec 2018)

He died on 17 March 1973 and was succeeded in his title and lands by his second son, Andrew, his eldest son having predeceased him by 25 years.

Baronetage of the United Kingdom
Preceded by Sir Charles Forbes-Leith	Baronet (of Jessfield); 1930–1973	Succeeded by Sir Andrew George Forbes-Leith
