= Alfred Trestrail =

English cricketer and lawyer

Personal information
- Full name: Alfred Ernest Yates Trestrail
- Born: 24 January 1876; Hallatrow Court, Somerset, England
- Died: 5 February 1935 (aged 59); New Milton, Hampshire, England

Domestic team information
- Years: Team
- 1905: Somerset

Career statistics
| Competition | FC |
|---|---|
| Matches | 1 |
| Runs scored | 7 |
| Batting average | 3.50 |
| 100s/50s | 0/0 |
| Top score | 4 |
| Catches/stumpings | 0/– |
- Source: CricketArchive, 22 December 2015

Alfred Ernest Yates Trestrail (24 January 1876, Hallatrow, Somerset – 5 February 1935, New Milton, Hampshire) was an English lawyer and cricketer.

Trestrail was educated at New College, Eastbourne and at Christ's College, Cambridge. He was a lawyer by profession. He played in one first-class cricket match for Somerset in the 1905 season.

An amateur who batted in the lower order, Trestrail was picked for the Somerset match against Lancashire at Taunton. After Lancashire had made 401 on the first day, he made 4 and then 3 as Somerset were beaten by an innings. He was one of three Somerset debutants in the match; for one of the others, Ernest Shorrocks, this was also the only first-class match. The third, John Harcombe played six further matches for Somerset up to 1919.

At the December 1910 United Kingdom general election, Trestrail stood unsuccessfully for the Liberal Party in Tiverton. He served in World War I, achieving the rank of major, and this changed his political outlook. He wrote to Arthur Henderson offering his services to the Labour Party, and was adopted as its candidate for Torquay. He stood there in the 1918 United Kingdom general election, but was not elected.

Following the war, Trestrail joined a law firm in Huddersfield, lived in Kirkburton, and was the moving spirit behind the building of the Woodsome Hall Golf Club.
