= Ernest Shorrocks =

English cricketer (1875–1916)

Personal information
- Full name: Ernest Shorrocks
- Born: 12 March 1875; Middleton, Lancashire, England
- Died: 20 July 1916 (aged 41); Thiepval, Somme, France

Domestic team information
- Years: Team
- 1905: Somerset

Career statistics
Competition	FC
Matches	1
Runs scored	16
Batting average	16.00
100s/50s	0/0
Top score	16*
Balls bowled	120
Wickets	2
Bowling average	30.00
5 wickets in innings	0
10 wickets in match	0
Best bowling	2/60
Catches/stumpings	0/–
- Source: CricketArchive, 22 December 2015

Ernest Shorrocks (12 March 1875 – 20 July 1916) was an English cricketer who played in one first-class cricket match for Somerset in the 1905 season.

A professional who batted in the lower order and bowled 20 overs in his one match, Shorrocks was picked for the Somerset match against Lancashire at Taunton. He took the wickets of Reggie Spooner and James Hallows for 60 runs as Lancashire made 401 on the first day, then made 0 and an unbeaten 16 as Somerset were beaten by an innings. He was one of three Somerset debutants in the match; for one of the others, Alfred Trestrail, this was also the only first-class match. The third, John Harcombe, played six further matches for Somerset up to 1919.

Shorrocks was a serjeant in the 20th battalion of the Royal Fusiliers and died in the First World War in the fighting on the Somme. He is commemorated on the Thiepval Memorial.
