= List of listed buildings in Fyvie, Aberdeenshire =

This is a list of listed buildings in the parish of Fyvie in Aberdeenshire, Scotland.

== List ==
Name	Location	Date Listed	Grid Ref. (Note: Sometimes known as OSGB36, the grid reference (where provided) is based on the British national grid reference system used by the Ordnance Survey. • "Guide to National Grid". Ordnance Survey. • "Get-a-map". Ordnance Survey.)	Geo-coordinates	Notes	LB Number (Note: Historic Environment Scotland assign a unique alphanumeric identifier to each designated site in Scotland, for listed buildings this always begins with "LB", for example "LB12345".)	Image
Fyvie Castle, Racquets Court				57°26′36″N 2°23′46″W	Category B	13411	Upload Photo
South Lodge, Rothie-Norman				57°24′26″N 2°27′26″W	Category C(S)	9584	Upload Photo
Fastern's Een Cross, Fyvie				57°26′01″N 2°23′24″W	Category C(S)	9597	Upload Photo
Clydesdale Bank, Fyvie				57°25′46″N 2°23′45″W	Category C(S)	9611	Upload Photo
Fyvie Castle				57°26′36″N 2°23′42″W	Category A	9615	Upload another image
Laundry House, Fyvie Castle				57°26′39″N 2°23′24″W	Category C(S)	9617	Upload Photo
Folla Rule Village Hall				57°23′13″N 2°26′55″W	Category B	47442	Upload Photo
Maryfield				57°25′51″N 2°23′38″W	Category C(S)	9599	Upload Photo
Priory Cross, Fyvie				57°25′47″N 2°23′36″W	Category C(S)	9612	Upload Photo
Manse Of Fyvie, Garden Walls				57°25′49″N 2°23′16″W	Category C(S)	9596	Upload Photo
Ivy Bridge Over River Ythan W.N.W. Of Fyvie Castle				57°26′38″N 2°23′50″W	Category B	9616	Upload Photo
East Gate And Lodge Fyvie Castle				57°26′28″N 2°22′55″W	Category B	9622	Upload Photo
St. George's Rectory Folla Rule				57°23′14″N 2°26′53″W	Category B	9587	Upload Photo
Masonic Lodge, Lewes, Fyvie				57°25′45″N 2°23′43″W	Category C(S)	9598	Upload Photo
Old Home Farm, Fyvie Castle				57°26′37″N 2°23′25″W	Category B	9618	Upload Photo
All Saints Episcopal Church, Woodhead				57°26′11″N 2°21′05″W	Category B	9624	Upload Photo
Manse (Formerly Woodhead Manse)				57°26′13″N 2°20′47″W	Category C(S)	9626	Upload Photo
Fyvie Parish Church				57°25′47″N 2°23′14″W	Category B	9630	Upload Photo
Tifty, Waterwheelhouse				57°27′24″N 2°22′30″W	Category C(S)	13720	Upload Photo
Manse Of Fyvie, Sundial				57°25′48″N 2°23′17″W	Category C(S)	9595	Upload Photo
Fyvie Castle South Gates				57°26′02″N 2°23′53″W	Category C(S)	9613	Upload Photo
Fyvie Castle Boathouse				57°26′22″N 2°23′25″W	Category B	9614	Upload Photo
Walled Garden, Fyvie Castle				57°26′35″N 2°23′25″W	Category C(S)	9619	Upload Photo
Fyvie, Main Street, Old School Building				57°25′53″N 2°23′42″W	Category B	6749	Upload Photo
Fyvie Castle, Disused Privy Between Castle And Ivy Bridge				57°26′37″N 2°23′48″W	Category C(S)	6750	Upload Photo
North Lodge, Kinbroon, By Rothienorman				57°24′30″N 2°27′58″W	Category C(S)	9585	Upload Photo
St. George's Episcopal Church, Folla Rule				57°23′12″N 2°26′51″W	Category B	9586	Upload Photo
Ardlogie House (Former Manse Of Fyvie)				57°25′49″N 2°23′18″W	Category C(S)	9594	Upload Photo
Oldwood Cottage, Fyvie Castle				57°26′31″N 2°23′07″W	Category B	9621	Upload Photo
Woodhead Tolbooth (Old Farm House, Woodhead)				57°26′12″N 2°21′09″W	Category B	9625	Upload Photo
Millbrex Church				57°28′44″N 2°18′00″W	Category B	9629	Upload Photo
Fyvie Parish Church, Old Churchyard, (Excluding Modern Cemetery)				57°25′46″N 2°23′14″W	Category C(S)	9631	Upload Photo
Statue, S. Of Walled Garden Fyvie Castle				57°26′30″N 2°23′29″W	Category B	9620	Upload Photo
North Lodge, Fyvie Castle				57°26′54″N 2°23′52″W	Category B	9623	Upload Photo
Fetterletter, Twin Circular Structures N.W. Of Farmhouse				57°26′25″N 2°19′42″W	Category C(S)	9627	Upload Photo
Gight Castle				57°26′34″N 2°17′27″W	Category B	9628	Upload Photo

== Key ==
The scheme for classifying buildings in Scotland is:

- Category A: "buildings of national or international importance, either architectural or historic; or fine, little-altered examples of some particular period, style or building type."
- Category B: "buildings of regional or more than local importance; or major examples of some particular period, style or building type, which may have been altered."
- Category C: "buildings of local importance; lesser examples of any period, style, or building type, as originally constructed or moderately altered; and simple traditional buildings which group well with other listed buildings."

In March 2016 there were 47,288 listed buildings in Scotland. Of these, 8% were Category A, and 50% were Category B, with the remaining 42% being Category C.

== See also ==
- List of listed buildings in Aberdeenshire
