= List of electoral wards in Devon =

This is a list of electoral divisions and wards in the ceremonial county of Devon in South West England. All changes since the re-organisation of local government following the passing of the Local Government Act 1972 are shown. The number of councillors elected for each electoral division or ward is shown in brackets.

== County council ==
=== Devon ===
Electoral Divisions from 1 April 1974 (first election 12 April 1973) to 2 May 1985:

1. Axminster Rural No. 1 (1)
2. Axminster Rural No. 2 (1)
3. Barnstaple No. 1 (1)
4. Barnstaple No. 2 (1)
5. Barnstaple Rural No. 1 (1)
6. Barnstaple Rural No. 2 (1)
7. Barnstaple Rural No. 3 (1)
8. Barnstaple Rural No. 4 (Lynton) (1)
9. Bideford (1)
10. Bideford Rural (1)
11. Budleigh Salterton (1)
12. Crediton (1)
13. Crediton Rural (1)
14. Dartmouth (1)
15. Dawlish (1)
16. Exeter No. 1 (1)
17. Exeter No. 2 (1)
18. Exeter No. 3 (1)
19. Exeter No. 4 (1)
20. Exeter No. 5 (2)
21. Exeter No. 6 (2)
22. Exeter No. 7 (2)
23. Exmouth No. 1 (1)
24. Exmouth No. 2 (Withycombe Raleigh) (1)
25. Exmouth No. 3 (1)
26. Holsworthy (1)
27. Honiton (1)
28. Ilfracombe (1)
29. Kingsbridge Rural No. 1 (1)
30. Kingsbridge Rural No. 2 (1)
31. Newton Abbot No. 1 (1)
32. Newton Abbot No. 2 (1)
33. Newton Abbot Rural No. 1 (1)
34. Newton Abbot Rural No. 2 (1)
35. Newton Abbot Rural No. 3 (1)
36. Newton Abbot Rural No. 4 (1)
37. Northam (1)
38. Okehampton (1)
39. Okehampton Rural (1)
40. Ottery St Mary (1)
41. Plymouth No. 1 (3)
42. Plymouth No. 2 (3)
43. Plymouth No. 3 (Crownhill) (2)
44. Plymouth No. 4 (Efford) (1)
45. Plymouth No. 5 (Ernesettle) (1)
46. Plymouth No. 6 (Ford) (1)
47. Plymouth No. 7 (Honicknowle) (1)
48. Plymouth No. 8 (Pennycross) (1)
49. Plymouth No. 9 (Plympton Erle) (1)
50. Plymouth No. 10 (Plympton St Mary) (1)
51. Plymouth No. 11 (Plymstock Dunstone (1)
52. Plymouth No. 12 (Plymstock Radford) (1)
53. Plymouth No. 13 (St Andrew) (1)
54. Plymouth No. 14 (St Aubyn) (1)
55. Plymouth No. 15 (St Budeaux) (1)
56. Plymouth No. 16 (St Peter) (1)
57. Plymouth No. 17 (Stoke) (1)
58. Plymouth No. 18 (Sutton) (1)
59. Plymouth No. 19 (Trelawny) (1)
60. Plymouth No. 20 (Mount Gould) (1)
61. Plympton St Mary No. 1 (1)
62. Plympton St Mary No. 2 (1)
63. Sidmouth No. 1 (1)
64. Sidmouth No. 2 (1)
65. South Molton (1)
66. St Thomas No. 1 (1)
67. St Thomas No. 2 (1)
68. Tavistock No. 1 (Tavistock) (1)
69. Tavistock No. 2 (1)
70. Tavistock No. 3 (1)
71. Teignmouth (1)
72. Tiverton (East) (1)
73. Tiverton (West) (1)
74. Tiverton Rural No. 1 (1)
75. Tiverton Rural No. 2 (1)
76. Torbay Blatchcombe (1)
77. Torbay Cockington with Chelston (1)
78. Torbay Coverdale (1)
79. Torbay Ellacombe (1)
80. Torbay Furzeham with Churston (1)
81. Torbay Hollicombe (1)
82. Torbay Shiphay (1)
83. Torbay St Marychurch (1)
84. Torbay St Michaels with Goodringt (1)
85. Torbay St Peters with St Marys (1)
86. Torbay Tormohun (1)
87. Torbay Torwood (1)
88. Torrington (1)
89. Totnes (1)
90. Totnes Rural (1)

Electoral Divisions from 2 May 1985 to 5 May 2005:

1. Alphington & St Thomas (1)
2. Ashburton & Buckfastleigh (1)
3. Axminster Rural (1)
4. Babbacombe (1); electoral division abolished in 1998
5. Barnstaple North (1)
6. Barnstaple South (1)
7. Barton (1); electoral division abolished in 1998
8. Barton & St Loyes (1)
9. Belvedere (1)
10. Berry Head (1); electoral division abolished in 1998
11. Bideford (1)
12. Bovey (1)
13. Bradninch & Creedy (1)
14. Braunton Rural (1)
15. Budleigh & Sidmouth (1)
16. Budshead (1); electoral division abolished in 1998
17. Clennon (1); electoral division abolished in 1998
18. Clyst Vale (1)
19. Combe Martin Rural (1)
20. Compton (1); electoral division abolished in 1998
21. Countess Wear & Topsham (1)
22. Crediton Rural (1)
23. Cullompton Rural (1)
24. Dartmouth Rural (1)
25. Dawlish (1)
26. Drake (1); electoral division abolished in 1998
27. Efford (1); electoral division abolished in 1998
28. Eggbuckland (1); electoral division abolished in 1998
29. Elberry (1); electoral division abolished in 1998
30. Ellacombe & Upton (1); electoral division abolished in 1998
31. Estover (1); electoral division abolished in 1998
32. Exmouth Littleham (1)
33. Exmouth Lympstone (1)
34. Exmouth Withycombe (1)
35. Exwick & Cowick (1)
36. Fremington Rural (1)
37. Ham (1); electoral division abolished in 1998
38. Hatherleigh & Chagford (1)
39. Heavitree & Wonford (1)
40. Holsworthy Rural (1)
41. Honicknowle (1); electoral division abolished in 1998
42. Honiton Rural (1)
43. Ilfracombe (1)
44. Ivybridge (1)
45. Keyham (1); electoral division abolished in 1998
46. Kings Ash (1); electoral division abolished in 1998
47. Kingsbridge Rural (1)
48. Kingsteignton (1)
49. Livermead (1); electoral division abolished in 1998
50. Manor (1); electoral division abolished in 1998
51. Modbury & Salcombe (1)
52. Mount Gould (1); electoral division abolished in 1998
53. Newton Abbot East (1)
54. Newton Abbot West (1)
55. Northam Rural (1)
56. Okehampton Rural (1)
57. Oldway (1); electoral division abolished in 1998
58. Ottery St Mary Rural (1)
59. Pinhoe & Whipton (1)
60. Plympton Erle (1); electoral division abolished in 1998
61. Plympton St Mary (1); electoral division abolished in 1998
62. Plymstock Dunstone (1); electoral division abolished in 1998
63. Plymstock Radford (1); electoral division abolished in 1998
64. Rougemont & St Leonards (1)
65. Seaton Rural (1)
66. Sidmouth Rural (1)
67. South Molton Rural (1)
68. Southway (1); electoral division abolished in 1998
69. St Budeaux (1); electoral division abolished in 1998
70. St Davids & Pennsylvania (1)
71. St Peter (1); electoral division abolished in 1998
72. Stoke (1); electoral division abolished in 1998
73. Stoke Hill & Polsloe (1)
74. Sutton (1); electoral division abolished in 1998
75. Tavistock (1)
76. Teignbridge South (1)
77. Teignmouth (1)
78. Tiverton East (1)
79. Tiverton West (1)
80. Torrington Rural (1)
81. Totnes Rural (1)
82. Trelawney (1); electoral division abolished in 1998
83. Wellswood (1); electoral division abolished in 1998
84. Wembury & Erme (1)
85. Yelverton Rural (1)

Electoral Divisions from 5 May 2005 to 4 May 2017:

1. Alphington & Cowick (1)
2. Ashburton & Buckfastleigh (1)
3. Axminster (1)
4. Barnstaple North (1)
5. Barnstaple South (1) †
6. Bickleigh & Wembury (1)
7. Bideford East (1)
8. Bideford South & Hartland (1)
9. Bovey Tracey Rural (1)
10. Braunton Rural (1)
11. Broadclyst & Whimple (1)
12. Budleigh (1)
13. Chudleigh Rural (1)
14. Chulmleigh & Swimbridge (1) †
15. Combe Martin Rural (1)
16. Crediton Rural (1)
17. Cullompton Rural (1)
18. Dartmouth & Kingswear (1)
19. Dawlish (1)
20. Duryard & Pennsylvania (1)
21. Exminster & Kenton (1)
22. Exmouth Brixington & Withycombe (1)
23. Exmouth Halsdon & Woodbury (1)
24. Exmouth Littleham & Town (1)
25. Exwick & St Thomas (1)
26. Fremington Rural (1)
27. Hatherleigh & Chagford (1)
28. Heavitree & Whipton & Barton (1)
29. Holsworthy Rural (1)
30. Honiton St Michael's (1)
31. Honiton St Paul's (1)
32. Ilfracombe (1)
33. Ivybridge (1)
34. Kingsbridge & Stokenham (1)
35. Kingsteignton (1)
36. Newton Abbot North (1)
37. Newton Abbot South (1) ‡
38. Newton St Cyres & Sandford (1)
39. Newtown & Polsloe (1)
40. Northam (1)
41. Okehampton Rural (1)
42. Ottery St Mary Rural (1)
43. Pinhoe & Mincinglake (1)
44. Priory & St Leonard's (1)
45. Seaton Coastal (1)
46. Sidmouth Sidford (1)
47. South Brent & Dartington (1)
48. South Molton Rural (1)
49. St David’s & St James (1)
50. St Loyes & Topsham (1)
51. Tavistock (1)
52. Teign Estuary (1)
53. Teignbridge South (1) ‡
54. Teignmouth (1)
55. Thurlestone, Salcombe & Allington (1)
56. Tiverton East (1)
57. Tiverton West (1)
58. Torrington Rural (1)
59. Totnes Rural (1)
60. Willand & Uffculme (1)
61. Yealmpton (1)
62. Yelverton Rural (1)

† minor boundary changes in 2009 ‡ minor boundary changes in 2013

Electoral Divisions from 4 May 2017 to present:

1. Alphington & Cowick (1)
2. Ashburton & Buckfastleigh (1)
3. Axminster (1)
4. Barnstaple North (1)
5. Barnstaple South (1)
6. Bickleigh & Wembury (1)
7. Bideford East (1)
8. Bideford West & Hartland (1)
9. Bovey Rural (1)
10. Braunton Rural (1)
11. Broadclyst (2)
12. Chudleigh & Teign Valley (1)
13. Chulmleigh & Landkey (1)
14. Combe Martin Rural (1)
15. Crediton (1)
16. Creedy, Taw & Mid Exe (1)
17. Cullompton & Bradninch (1)
18. Dartmouth & Marldon (1)
19. Dawlish (1)
20. Duryard & Pennsylvania (1)
21. Exminster & Haldon (1)
22. Exmouth (2)
23. Exmouth & Budleigh Salterton Coastal (1)
24. Exwick & St Thomas (1)
25. Feniton & Honiton (1)
26. Fremington Rural (1)
27. Hatherleigh & Chagford (1)
28. Heavitree & Whipton Barton (1)
29. Holsworthy Rural (1)
30. Ilfracombe (1)
31. Ipplepen & The Kerswells (1)
32. Ivybridge (1)
33. Kingsbridge (1)
34. Kingsteignton & Teign Estuary (1)
35. Newton Abbot North (1)
36. Newton Abbot South (1)
37. Northam (1)
38. Okehampton Rural (1)
39. Otter Valley (1)
40. Pinhoe & Mincinglake (1)
41. Salcombe (1)
42. Seaton & Colyton (1)
43. Sidmouth (1)
44. South Brent & Yealmpton (1)
45. South Molton (1)
46. St David’s & Haven Banks (1)
47. St Sidwells & St James (1)
48. Tavistock (1)
49. Teignmouth (1)
50. Tiverton East (1)
51. Tiverton West (1)
52. Torrington Rural (1)
53. Totnes & Dartington (1)
54. Wearside & Topsham (1)
55. Whimple & Blackdown (1)
56. Willand & Uffculme (1)
57. Wonford & St Loyes (1)
58. Yelverton Rural (1)

== Unitary authority councils ==
=== Plymouth ===
Wards from 1 April 1974 (first election 7 June 1973) to 3 May 1979:

1. Compton (3)
2. Crownhill (3)
3. Drake (3)
4. Efford (3)
5. Ernesettle (3)
6. Ford (3)
7. Honicknowle (3)
8. Mount Gould (3)
9. Pennycross (3)
10. Plympton Erle (3)
11. Plympton St Mary (3)
12. Plymstock Dunstone (3)
13. Plymstock Radford (3)
14. St Andrew (3)
15. St Aubyn (3)
16. St Budeaux (3)
17. St Peter (3)
18. Stoke (3)
19. Sutton (3)
20. Tamerton (3)
21. Trelawny (3)
22. Whitleigh (3)

Wards from 3 May 1979 to 1 May 2003:

1. Budshead (3)
2. Compton (3)
3. Drake (3)
4. Efford (3)
5. Eggbuckland (3)
6. Estover (3)
7. Ham (3)
8. Honicknowle (3)
9. Keyham (3)
10. Mount Gould (3)
11. Plympton Erle (3)
12. Plympton St Mary (3)
13. Plymstock Dunstone (3)
14. Plymstock Radford (3)
15. Southway (3)
16. St Budeaux (3)
17. St Peter (3)
18. Stoke (3)
19. Sutton (3)
20. Trelawny (3)

Wards from 1 May 2003 to present:

1. Budshead (3)
2. Compton (3)
3. Devonport (3)
4. Drake (2)
5. Efford & Lipson (3)
6. Eggbuckland (3)
7. Ham (3)
8. Honicknowle (3)
9. Moor View (3)
10. Peverell (3)
11. Plympton Chaddlewood (2)
12. Plympton Erle (2)
13. Plympton St Mary (3)
14. Plymstock Dunstone (3)
15. Plymstock Radford (3)
16. St Budeaux (3)
17. St Peter & the Waterfront (3)
18. Southway (3)
19. Stoke (3)
20. Sutton & Mount Gould (3)

=== Torbay ===
Wards from 1 April 1974 (first election 7 June 1973) to 5 May 1983:

1. Blatchcombe (3)
2. Cockington-with-Chelston (3)
3. Coverdale (3)
4. Ellacombe (3)
5. Furzeham-with-Churston (3)
6. Hollicombe (3)
7. Shiphay (3)
8. St Marychurch (3)
9. St Michaels-with-Goodrington (3)
10. St Peters-with-St Marys (3)
11. Tormohun (3)
12. Torwood (3)

Wards from 5 May 1983 to 1 May 2003:

Wards from 1 May 2003 to 2 May 2019:

1. Berry Head-with-Furzeham (3)
2. Blatchcombe (3)
3. Churston-with-Galmpton (2)
4. Clifton-with-Maidenway (2)
5. Cockington-with-Chelston (3)
6. Ellacombe (2)
7. Goodrington-with-Roselands (2)
8. Preston (3)
9. Roundham-with-Hyde (2)
10. St Marychurch (3)
11. St Mary's-with-Summercombe (2)
12. Shiphay-with-the-Willows (2)
13. Tormohun (3)
14. Watcombe (2)
15. Wellswood (2)

Wards from 2 May 2019 to present:

1. Barton with Watcombe (3)
2. Churston with Galmpton (2)
3. Clifton with Maidenway (2)
4. Cockington with Chelston (2)
5. Collaton St Mary (1)
6. Ellacombe (2)
7. Furzeham with Summercombe (3)
8. Goodrington with Roselands (2)
9. King's Ash (2)
10. Preston (3)
11. Roundham with Hyde (2)
12. Shiphay (2)
13. St Marychurch (3)
14. St Peter's with St Mary's (2)
15. Tormohun (3)
16. Wellswood (2)

== District councils ==
=== East Devon ===
Wards from 1 April 1974 (first election 7 June 1973) to 3 May 1979:

1. No. 2 (Stockland) (1)
2. No. 10 (Upottery) (1)
3. No. 11 (Awliscombe) (1)
4. No. 12 (Offwell) (1)
5. No. 13 (Feniton) (1)
6. No. 16 (Sidmouth) (5)
7. No. 17 (Honiton) (3)
8. No. 19 (Tipton St John) (2)
9. No. 23 (Whimple) (1)
10. No. 24 (Broadclyst) (2)
11. No. 30 (Exmouth: Halsdon) (3)
12. No. 31 (Exmouth: Littleham Rural) (3)
13. No. 32 (Exmouth: Littleham Urban) (3)
14. No. 33 (Exmouth: Withycombe Raleigh) (3)
15. No. 34 (Exmouth: Withycombe Urban) (3)
16. Axminster Hamlets (1)
17. Axminster Town (2)
18. Beer (1)
19. Budleigh Salterton (3)
20. Clyst Valley (1)
21. Clystbeare (1)
22. Colyton (1)
23. Exe Valley (1)
24. Lympstone (1)
25. Newbridges (1)
26. Newton Poppleford & Harpford (1)
27. Ottery St Mary Town (2)
28. Raleigh (1)
29. Seaton (3)
30. Sidmouth Rural (3)
31. Tale Vale (1)
32. Trinity (1)
33. Upper Axe (1)
34. Woodbury (1)

Wards from 3 May 1979 to 1 May 2003:

Wards from 1 May 2003 to 2 May 2019:

1. Axminster Rural (1)
2. Axminster Town (2)
3. Beer & Branscombe (1)
4. Broadclyst (2)
5. Budleigh (3)
6. Clyst Valley (1)
7. Coly Valley (2)
8. Dunkeswell (1)
9. Exe Valley (1)
10. Exmouth Brixington (3)
11. Exmouth Halsdon (3)
12. Exmouth Littleham (3)
13. Exmouth Town (3)
14. Exmouth Withycombe Raleigh (3)
15. Feniton & Buckerell (1)
16. Honiton St Michael's (3)
17. Honiton St Paul's (2)
18. Newbridges (1)
19. Newton Poppleford & Harpford (1)
20. Ottery St Mary Rural (2)
21. Ottery St Mary Town (2)
22. Otterhead (1)
23. Raleigh (1)
24. Seaton (3)
25. Sidmouth Rural (1)
26. Sidmouth Sidford (3)
27. Sidmouth Town (3)
28. Tale Vale (1)
29. Trinity (1)
30. Whimple (1)
31. Woodbury & Lympstone (2)
32. Yarty (1)

Wards from 2 May 2019 to present:

1. Axminster (3)
2. Beer & Branscombe (1)
3. Broadclyst (3)
4. Budleigh & Raleigh (3)
5. Clyst Valley (1)
6. Coly Valley (2)
7. Cranbrook (3)
8. Dunkeswell & Otterhead (2)
9. Exe Valley (1)
10. Exmouth Brixington (3)
11. Exmouth Halsdon (3)
12. Exmouth Littleham (3)
13. Exmouth Town (3)
14. Exmouth Withycombe Raleigh (2)
15. Feniton (1)
16. Honiton St Michael's (3)
17. Honiton St Paul's (2)
18. Newbridges (1)
19. Newton Poppleford & Harpford (1)
20. Ottery St Mary (3)
21. Seaton (3)
22. Sidmouth Rural (1)
23. Sidmouth Sidford (3)
24. Sidmouth Town (2)
25. Tale Vale (1)
26. Trinity (1)
27. West Hill & Aylesbeare (1)
28. Whimple & Rockbeare (1)
29. Woodbury & Lympstone (2)
30. Yarty (1)

=== Exeter ===
Wards from 1 April 1974 (first election 7 June 1973) to 5 May 1983:

1. Alphington (2)
2. Barton (2)
3. Countess Wear (2)
4. Cowick (2)
5. Exwick (2)
6. Heavitree (2)
7. Pennsylvania (2)
8. Pinhoe (2)
9. Polsloe (2)
10. Rougemont (2)
11. St Leonards (2)
12. St Matthews (2)
13. St Thomas (2)
14. Stoke Hill (2)
15. Topsham (2)
16. Whipton (2)
17. Wonford (2)

Wards from 5 May 1983 to 4 May 2000:

1. Alphington (2)
2. Barton (2)
3. Countess Wear (2)
4. Cowick (2)
5. Exwick (2)
6. Heavitree (2)
7. Pennsylvania (2)
8. Pinhoe (2)
9. Polsloe (2)
10. Rougemont (2)
11. St Davids (2)
12. St Leonards (2)
13. St Loyes (2)
14. St Thomas (2)
15. Stoke Hill (2)
16. Topsham (2)
17. Whipton (2)
18. Wonford (2)

Wards from 4 May 2000 to 5 May 2016:

1. Alphington (3)
2. Cowick (2)
3. Duryard (2)
4. Exwick (3)
5. Heavitree (2)
6. Mincinglake (2)
7. Newtown (2)
8. Pennsylvania (2)
9. Pinhoe (2)
10. Polsloe (2)
11. Priory (3)
12. St David's (2)
13. St James (2)
14. St Leonard's (2)
15. St Loyes (2)
16. St Thomas (2)
17. Topsham (2)
18. Whipton & Barton (3)

Wards from 5 May 2016 to present:

1. Alphington (3)
2. Duryard & St James (3)
3. Exwick (3)
4. Heavitree (3)
5. Mincinglake & Whipton (3)
6. Newtown & St Leonard’s (3)
7. Pennsylvania (3)
8. Pinhoe (3)
9. Priory (3)
10. St Loyes (3)
11. St David’s (3)
12. St Thomas (3)
13. Topsham (3)

=== Mid Devon ===
Wards from 1 April 1974 (first election 7 June 1973) to 3 May 1979:

1. No. 1 (Tiverton: Castle) (4)
2. No. 2 (Tiverton: Lowman) (4)
3. No. 3 (Tiverton: Westexe) (4)
4. No. 4 (Crediton) (4)
5. No. 7 (Cheriton Fitzpaine) (1)
6. No. 8 (Morchard Bishop) (1)
7. No. 11 (Crediton Hamlets) (2)
8. No. 18 (Cullompton) (4)
9. Bradninch (1)
10. Cadbury (1)
11. Canonsleigh (1)
12. Clare (1)
13. Culm (2)
14. Halberton (1)
15. Newbrooke (1)
16. Paullet (1)
17. Sandford (1)
18. Shuttern (1)
19. Silverton (1)
20. Taw (1)
21. Taw Vale (1)
22. Upper Culm (1)
23. Willand (1)

Wards from 3 May 1979 to 1 May 2003:

1. Boniface (2)
2. Bradninch (1)
3. Cadbury (1)
4. Canal (3)
5. Canonsleigh (1)
6. Castle (3)
7. Clare (1)
8. Cullompton Outer (1)
9. Cullompton Town (3)
10. Culm (2)
11. East Creedy (1)
12. Halberton (1)
13. Lawrence (2)
14. Lowman (2)
15. Newbrooke (1)
16. Paullet (1)
17. Sandford (1)
18. Shuttern (1)
19. Silverton (1)
20. Taw (1)
21. Taw Vale (1)
22. Upper Culm (1)
23. Upper Yeo (1)
24. West Creedy (1)
25. Westexe North (2)
26. Westexe South (2)
27. Willand (1)
28. Yeo (1)

Wards from 1 May 2003 to 4 May 2023:

1. Boniface (2)
2. Bradninch (1)
3. Cadbury (1)
4. Canonsleigh (2)
5. Castle (2)
6. Clare & Shuttern (2)
7. Cranmore (3)
8. Cullompton North (2)
9. Cullompton Outer (1)
10. Cullompton South (2)
11. Halberton (1)
12. Lawrence (2)
13. Lower Culm (3)
14. Lowman (3)
15. Newbrooke (1)
16. Sandford & Creedy (2)
17. Silverton (1)
18. Taw (1)
19. Taw Vale (1)
20. Upper Culm (2)
21. Upper Yeo (1)
22. Way (1)
23. Westexe (3)
24. Yeo (2)

Wards from 4 May 2023 to present:

1. Bradninch (1)
2. Cadbury (1)
3. Canonsleigh (2)
4. Clare & Shuttern (2)
5. Crediton Boniface (2)
6. Crediton Lawrence (2)
7. Cullompton Padbrook (2)
8. Cullompton St Andrews (3)
9. Cullompton Vale (1)
10. Halberton (1)
11. Lower Culm (3)
12. Sandford & Creedy (2)
13. Silverton (1)
14. Taw Vale (1)
15. Tiverton Castle (2)
16. Tiverton Cranmore (3)
17. Tiverton Lowman (3)
18. Tiverton Westexe (3)
19. Upper Culm (2)
20. Upper Yeo & Taw (2)
21. Way (1)
22. Yeo (2)

=== North Devon ===
Wards from 1 April 1974 (first election 7 June 1973) to 5 May 1983:

1. No. 10 (Braunton) (4)
2. No. 11 (Fremington) (3)
3. No. 12 (Instow) (1)
4. No. 14 (Parracombe) (1)
5. No. 16 (Mortehoe) (1)
6. No. 17 (Marwood) (1)
7. No. 18 (Georgeham) (1)
8. No. 19 (Heanton Punchardon) (1)
9. No. 20 (Bratton Fleming) (1)
10. No. 21 (Swimbridge) (1)
11. No. 25 (Chittlehampton) (1)
12. No. 26 (Chulmleigh) (1)
13. No. 27 (Witheridge) (1)
14. No. 29 (North Molton) (1)
15. Bishops Nympton (1)
16. Bishops Tawton (1)
17. Combe Martin (2)
18. Ilfracombe Central (2)
19. Ilfracombe East (2)
20. Ilfracombe West (2)
21. Longbridge (1)
22. Lynton & Lynmouth (1)
23. Newport (2)
24. Pilton (2)
25. South Molton (2)
26. St Marys (2)
27. Tawstock (1)
28. Trinity (2)
29. Yeo (2)

Wards from 5 May 1983 to 1 May 2003:

Wards from 1 May 2003 to 2 May 2019:

1. Bickington & Roundswell (2)
2. Bishop’s Nympton (1)
3. Bratton Fleming (1)
4. Braunton East (2)
5. Braunton West (2)
6. Central Town (2)
7. Chittlehampton (1) ‡
8. Chulmleigh (1)
9. Combe Martin (2)
10. Forches & Whiddon Valley (2)
11. Fremington (2)
12. Georgeham & Mortehoe (2)
13. Heanton Punchardon (1)
14. Ilfracombe Central (2)
15. Ilfracombe East (1)
16. Ilfracombe West (2)
17. Instow (1)
18. Landkey, Swimbridge & Taw (2) †‡
19. Longbridge (2)
20. Lynton & Lynmouth (1)
21. Marwood (1)
22. Newport (2) †
23. North Molton (1)
24. Pilton (2)
25. South Molton (2)
26. Witheridge (1)
27. Yeo Valley (2)

† minor boundary changes in 2007 ‡ minor boundary changes in 2015

Wards from 2 May 2019 to present:

1. Barnstaple Central (1)
2. Barnstaple with Pilton (3)
3. Barnstaple with Westacott (3)
4. Bickington (3)
5. Bishop's Nympton (1)
6. Bratton Fleming (1)
7. Braunton East (2)
8. Braunton West & Georgeham (2)
9. Chittlehampton (1)
10. Chulmleigh (1)
11. Combe Martin (1)
12. Fremington (2)
13. Heanton Punchardon (1)
14. Ilfracombe East (3)
15. Ilfracombe West (2)
16. Instow (1)
17. Landkey (2)
18. Lynton & Lynmouth (1)
19. Marwood (1)
20. Mortehoe (1)
21. Newport (2)
22. North Molton (1)
23. Roundswell (2)
24. South Molton (3)
25. Witheridge (1)

=== South Hams ===
Wards from 1 April 1974 (first election 7 June 1973) to 3 May 1979:

1. No. 1 (Dartmouth) (4)
2. No. 2 (Totnes) (4)
3. Avon & Harbourne (1)
4. Avonleigh (1)
5. Bickleigh & Shaugh (1)
6. Brixton (1)
7. Charterlands (1)
8. Cornwood & Harford (1)
9. Dart Valley (1)
10. Dartington (1)
11. Eastmoor (1)
12. Erme Valley (1)
13. Garabrook (1)
14. Ivybridge (2)
15. Kingsbridge (2)
16. Kingswear (1)
17. Malborough (1)
18. Marldon (1)
19. Modbury (1)
20. Newton & Noss (1)
21. Salcombe (2)
22. Saltstone (1)
23. Skerries (1)
24. South Brent (1)
25. Sparkwell (1)
26. Stoke Gabriel (1)
27. Stokenham (1)
28. Thurlestone (1)
29. Ugborough (1)
30. Wembury (1)
31. West Dart (1)
32. Yealmpton (1)

Wards from 3 May 1979 to 6 May 1999:

Wards from 6 May 1999 to 7 May 2015:

1. Allington & Loddiswell (1)
2. Avon & Harbourne (1)
3. Bickleigh & Shaugh (2)
4. Charterlands (1)
5. Cornwood & Sparkwell (1)
6. Dartington (1)
7. Dartmouth & Kingswear (3)
8. Dartmouth Townstal (1)
9. East Dart (1)
10. Eastmoor (1)
11. Erme Valley (2)
12. Ivybridge Central (1)
13. Ivybridge Filham (2)
14. Ivybridge Woodlands (2)
15. Kingsbridge East (1)
16. Kingsbridge North (1)
17. Marldon (1)
18. Newton & Noss (1)
19. Salcombe & Malborough (2)
20. Saltstone (1)
21. Skerries (1)
22. South Brent (1)
23. Stokenham (1)
24. Thurlestone (1)
25. Totnes Bridgetown (2)
26. Totnes Town (2)
27. Wembury & Brixton (2)
28. West Dart (1)
29. Westville & Alvington (1)
30. Yealmpton (1)

Wards from 7 May 2015 to present:

1. Allington & Strete (1)
2. Bickleigh & Cornwood (1)
3. Blackawton & Stoke Fleming (1)
4. Charterlands (1)
5. Dartington & Staverton (1)
6. Dartmouth & East Dart (3)
7. Ermington & Ugborough (1)
8. Ivybridge East (2)
9. Ivybridge West (2)
10. Kingsbridge (2)
11. Loddiswell & Aveton Gifford (1)
12. Marldon & Littlehempston (1)
13. Newton & Yealmpton (2)
14. Salcombe & Thurlestone (2)
15. South Brent (2)
16. Stokenham (1)
17. Totnes (3)
18. Wembury & Brixton (2)
19. West Dart (1)
20. Woolwell (1)

=== Teignbridge ===
Wards from 1 April 1974 (first election 7 June 1973) to 3 May 1979:

1. No. 6 (Newton Abbot: Milber & Forde) (4)
2. No. 7 (Newton Abbot: College-Market-St Leonards) (4)
3. No. 8 (Newton Abbot: Bradley & Bushell) (4)
4. No. 10 (Teignmouth: Western) (3)
5. No. 11 (Teignmouth: Central) (2)
6. No. 12 (Teignmouth: Eastern) (2)
7. No. 17 (Kingsteignton) (4)
8. No. 18 (Chudleigh) (2)
9. No. 19 (Bishopsteignton) (1)
10. No. 25 (Hennock) (1)
11. No. 26 (Kenton) (1)
12. No. 27 (Exminster) (2)
13. No. 29 (Christow) (1)
14. Abbotskerswell (1)
15. Ambrook (1)
16. Ashburton (2)
17. Bovey (3)
18. Buckfastleigh (2)
19. Dawlish Central (2)
20. Dawlish North East (2)
21. Dawlish South West (2)
22. Dunsford (1)
23. Haytor (1)
24. Ipplepen (1)
25. Kenn Valley (1)
26. Kingerswell (2)
27. Moorland (1)
28. Moretonhampstead (1)
29. Shaldon (1)
30. Teignhydes (1)
31. Whitestone (1)

Wards from 3 May 1979 to 1 May 2003:

Wards from 1 May 2003 to 2 May 2019:

1. Ambrook (2) †
2. Ashburton & Buckfastleigh (3)
3. Bishopsteignton (1)
4. Bovey (3)
5. Bradley (2)
6. Buckland & Milber (3)
7. Bushell (2)
8. Chudleigh (2)
9. College (2) †
10. Dawlish Central & North East (3)
11. Dawlish South West (2)
12. Haytor (1)
13. Ipplepen (1)
14. Kenn Valley (2)
15. Kenton with Starcross (1)
16. Kerswell-with-Combe (2)
17. Kingsteignton East (2)
18. Kingsteignton West (2)
19. Moorland (1)
20. Shaldon & Stokeinteignhead (1)
21. Teignbridge North (1)
22. Teignmouth Central (2)
23. Teignmouth East (2)
24. Teignmouth West (2)
25. Teign Valley (1)

† minor boundary changes in 2011

Wards from 2 May 2019 to present:

1. Ambrook (2)
2. Ashburton & Buckfastleigh (3)
3. Bishopsteignton (1)
4. Bovey (3)
5. Bradley (2)
6. Buckland & Milber (3)
7. Bushell (2)
8. Chudleigh (2)
9. College (2)
10. Dawlish North East (3)
11. Dawlish South West (2)
12. Haytor (1)
13. Ipplepen (1)
14. Kenn Valley (3)
15. Kenton & Starcross (1)
16. Kerswell-with-Combe (2)
17. Kingsteignton East (2)
18. Kingsteignton West (2)
19. Moretonhampstead (1)
20. Shaldon & Stokeinteignhead (1)
21. Teign Valley (2)
22. Teignmouth Central (2)
23. Teignmouth East (2)
24. Teignmouth West (2)

=== Torridge ===
Wards from 1 April 1974 (first election 7 June 1973) to 3 May 1979:

1. No. 2 (Bideford West) (5)
2. No. 4 (Appledore) (2)
3. No. 6 (Northam & Orchard Hill) (3)
4. No. 7 (Hartland) (1)
5. No. 8 (Woolfardisworthy) (1)
6. No. 9 (Parkham) (1)
7. No. 11 (Bradworthy) (1)
8. No. 12 (Pyworthy) (1)
9. No. 14 (Milton Damerel) (1)
10. No. 15 (Broadwoodwidger) (1)
11. No. 16 (Ashwater) (1)
12. No. 19 (Shebbear) (1)
13. No. 20 (Langtree) (1)
14. No. 21 (High Bickington) (1)
15. No. 22 (St Giles-in-the-Wood) (1)
16. Bideford East (4)
17. Holsworthy (2)
18. Kenwith (1)
19. Stafford (1)
20. Torrington (3)
21. Westward Ho! (2)
22. Winkleigh (1)

Wards from 3 May 1979 to 1 May 2003:

Wards from 1 May 2003 to 2 May 2019:

1. Appledore (2)
2. Bideford East (3)
3. Bideford North (3)
4. Bideford South (3)
5. Broadheath (1)
6. Clinton (1)
7. Clovelly Bay (1)
8. Coham Bridge (1)
9. Forest (1)
10. Hartland & Bradworthy (2)
11. Holsworthy (2)
12. Kenwith (1)
13. Monkleigh & Littleham (1)
14. Northam (3)
15. Orchard Hill (1)
16. Shebbear & Langtree (1)
17. Tamarside (1)
18. Three Moors (1)
19. Torrington (3)
20. Two Rivers (1)
21. Waldon (1)
22. Westward Ho! (1)
23. Winkleigh (1)

Wards from 2 May 2019 to present:

1. Appledore (2)
2. Bideford East (3)
3. Bideford North (3)
4. Bideford South (2)
5. Bideford West (2)
6. Broadheath (2)
7. Great Torrington (3)
8. Hartland (3)
9. Holsworthy (2)
10. Milton & Tamarside (2)
11. Monkleigh & Putford (2)
12. Northam (3)
13. Shebbear & Langtree (2)
14. Two Rivers & Three Moors (2)
15. Westward Ho! (2)
16. Winkleigh (1)

=== West Devon ===
Wards from 1 April 1974 (first election 7 June 1973) to 3 May 1979:

1. No. 17 (Tavistock) (6)
2. Bere Ferrers (2)
3. Bridestowe (1)
4. Buckland Monochorum (2)
5. Burrator (1)
6. Chagford (1)
7. Courtenay (1)
8. Drewsteignton (1)
9. Exbourne (1)
10. Hatherleigh (1)
11. Lew Valley (1)
12. Lydford (1)
13. Mary Tavy (1)
14. Milton Ford (1)
15. North Tawton (1)
16. Okehampton (3)
17. South Tawton (1)
18. Tamarside (1)
19. Thrushel (1)
20. Walkham (2)

Wards from 3 May 1979 to 1 May 2003:

Wards from 1 May 2003 to 7 May 2015:

1. Bere Ferrers (2)
2. Bridestowe (1)
3. Buckland Monachorum (2)
4. Burrator (1)
5. Chagford (1)
6. Drewsteignton (1)
7. Exbourne (1)
8. Hatherleigh (1)
9. Lew Valley (1)
10. Lydford (1)
11. Mary Tavy (1)
12. Milton Ford (1)
13. Okehampton East (2)
14. Okehampton West (2)
15. Tamarside (1)
16. Tavistock North (3)
17. Tavistock South (3)
18. Tavistock South West (1)
19. North Tawton (1)
20. South Tawton (1)
21. Thrushel (1)
22. Walkham (2)

Wards from 7 May 2015 to present:

1. Bere Ferrers (2)
2. Bridestowe (2)
3. Buckland Monachorum (2)
4. Burrator (2)
5. Chagford (1)
6. Dartmoor (1)
7. Drewsteignton (1)
8. Exbourne (2)
9. Hatherleigh (2)
10. Mary Tavy (1)
11. Milton Ford (1)
12. Okehampton North (3)
13. Okehampton South (2)
14. South Tawton (1)
15. Tamarside (1)
16. Tavistock North (3)
17. Tavistock South East (2)
18. Tavistock South West (2)

== Electoral wards by constituency ==
Wards as they existed on 1 December 2020.

=== Central Devon ===
Mid Devon: Boniface; Bradninch; Cadbury; Lawrence; Newbrooke; Sandford & Creedy; Silverton; Taw; Taw Vale; Upper Yeo; Way; Yeo.

Teignbridge: Ashburton & Buckfastleigh; Bovey; Chudleigh; Haytor; Kenn Valley; Moretonhampstead; Teign Valley.

West Devon: Chagford; Drewsteignton; Exbourne; Hatherleigh; Okehampton North; Okehampton South; South Tawton.

=== Exeter ===
Exeter: Alphington; Duryard & St. James; Exwick; Heavitree; Mincinglake & Whipton; Newtown & St. Leonard’s; Pennsylvania; Priory; St. David’s; St. Thomas.

=== Exmouth and Exeter East ===
East Devon: Broadclyst; Budleigh & Raleigh; Clyst Valley; Cranbrook; Exe Valley; Exmouth Brixington; Exmouth Halsdon; Exmouth Littleham; Exmouth Town; Exmouth Withycombe Raleigh; Whimple & Rockbeare; Woodbury & Lympstone.

Exeter: Pinhoe; St. Loyes; Topsham.

=== Honiton and Sidmouth ===
East Devon: Axminster; Beer & Branscombe; Coly Valley; Dunkeswell & Otterhead; Feniton; Honiton St. Michael’s; Honiton St. Paul’s; Newbridges; Newton Poppleford & Harpford; Ottery St. Mary; Seaton; Sidmouth Rural; Sidmouth Sidford; Sidmouth Town; Tale Vale; Trinity; West Hill & Aylesbeare; Yarty.

Mid Devon: Cullompton North; Cullompton Outer; Cullompton South.

=== Newton Abbot ===
Teignbridge: Ambrook; Bishopsteignton; Bradley; Buckland & Milber; Bushell; College; Dawlish North East; Dawlish South West; Ipplepen; Kenton & Starcross; Kerswell-with-Combe; Kingsteignton East; Kingsteignton West; Shaldon & Stokeinteignhead; Teignmouth Central; Teignmouth East; Teignmouth West.

=== North Devon ===
North Devon: Barnstaple Central; Barnstaple with Pilton; Barnstaple with Westacott; Bickington; Bishop's Nympton; Bratton Fleming; Braunton East; Braunton West & Georgeham; Chittlehampton; Chulmleigh; Combe Martin; Fremington; Heanton Punchardon; Ilfracombe East; Ilfracombe West; Instow; Landkey; Lynton & Lynmouth; Marwood; Mortehoe; Newport; North Molton; Roundswell; South Molton; Witheridge.

=== Plymouth Moor View ===
Plymouth: Budshead; Eggbuckland; Ham; Honicknowle; Moor View; Peverall (polling districts KC & KD); Southway; St. Budeaux.

=== Plymouth Sutton and Devonport ===
Plymouth: Compton; Devonport; Drake; Efford & Lipson, Peverell (polling districts KA, KB & KE); St. Peter & the Waterfront; Stoke; Sutton & Mount Gould.

=== South Devon ===
South Hams: Allington & Strete; Blackawton & Stoke Fleming; Charterlands; Dartington & Staverton; Dartmouth & East Dart; Kingsbridge; Loddiswell & Aveton Gifford; Marldon & Littlehempston; Salcombe & Thurlestone; South Brent; Stokenham; Totnes; West Dart.

Torbay: Churston with Galmpton; Collaton St. Mary; Furzeham with Summercombe; King’s Ash; St. Peter’s with St. Mary’s.

=== South West Devon ===
Plymouth: Plympton Chaddlewood; Plympton Erle; Plympton St. Mary; Plymstock Dunstone; Plymstock Radford.

South Hams: Bickleigh & Cornwood; Ermington & Ugborough; Ivybridge East; Ivybridge West; Newton & Yealmpton; Wembury & Brixton; Woolwell.

West Devon: Buckland Monachorum; Burrator.

=== Tiverton and Minehead (part) ===
Mid Devon: Canonsleigh; Castle; Clare & Shuttern; Cranmore; Halberton; Lower Culm; Lowman; Upper Culm; Westexe.

=== Torbay ===
Torbay: Barton with Watcombe; Clifton with Maidenway; Cockington with Chelston; Ellacombe; Goodrington with Roselands; Preston; Roundham with Hyde; St. Marychurch; Shiphay; Tormohun; Wellswood.

=== Torridge and Tavistock ===
Torridge: Appledore; Bideford East; Bideford North; Bideford South; Bideford West; Broadheath; Great Torrington; Hartland; Holsworthy; Milton & Tamarside; Monkleigh & Putford; Northam; Shebbear & Langtree; Two Rivers & Three Moors; Westward Ho!; Winkleigh.

West Devon: Bere Ferrers; Bridestowe; Dartmoor; Mary Tavy; Milton Ford; Tamarside; Tavistock North; Tavistock South East; Tavistock South West.

== See also ==
- List of parliamentary constituencies in Devon
