= Forbes-Leith baronets of Fyvie =

The Forbes-Leith of Fyvie baronetcy, of Jessfield in the County of Midlothian, originally the Burn baronetcy, was created in the Baronetage of the United Kingdom on 7 March 1923 for the soldier and Conservative politician Charles Rosdew Burn. He had previously represented Torquay in the House of Commons. Burn was the youngest son of General Robert Burn and the husband of Hon. Ethel, only daughter and heiress of Alexander John Forbes-Leith, 1st Baron Leith of Fyvie.

By edict of the Lord Lyon in 1925 Burn assumed the surname and arms of Forbes-Leith of Fyvie, for himself, his wife and son, according to the terms of his father-in-law's will. Lord Leith of Fyvie was the eldest son of Rear-Admiral John James Leith by his wife Margaret, daughter and heir of Alexander Forbes, a descendant of Duncan Forbes, second son of the second Lord Forbes. The first Baronet's younger son, the second Baronet, served as Lord Lieutenant of Aberdeenshire from 1959 to 1973.

== Burn, later Forbes-Leith of Fyvie, of Jessfield (1923) ==
- Sir Charles Rosdew Forbes-Leith, 1st Baronet (1859–1930)
- Sir (Robert) Ian (Algernon) Forbes-Leith, 2nd Baronet (1902–1973)
- Sir Andrew George Forbes-Leith, 3rd Baronet (1929–2000)
- Sir George Ian David Forbes-Leith, 4th Baronet (born 1967)

The heir apparent is the present holder's son Alexander Philip George Forbes-Leith (born 1999).
