= Spook Squad =

British children's game show

- Created by: BBC Scotland
- Presented by: Andrew Pepper
- Starring: Ford Kiernan
- Country of origin: United Kingdom
- No. of series: 1
- No. of episodes: 13

Production
- Running time: 30 minutes

Original release
- Network: BBC One; CBBC Channel
- Release: 6 January – 30 March 2004

Spook Squad is a British children's television game show created by BBC Scotland. It ran on CBBC's section BBC1 and BBC2 from 6 January 2004, to 30 March 2004. The game show featured three children contestants entering a haunted castle in Scotland to assist Professor MacAbre in hunting ghosts before they reach their "death day" and gain superpowers. The show was filmed in Fyvie Castle.

== Format ==
Spook Squad follows a repetitive format with each of its episodes. The game show's plot involves three children visiting a haunted castle in Scotland to gain a place in the Spook Squad, a league of Ghostbusters-like ghost hunters. They are met by Professor MacAbre (Andrew Pepper), an eccentric and rather cowardly paranormalist, who acts as the game show's host and gives instructions to the children when they play the games. Each episode involves the contestants and Professor Rupert MacAbre preventing ghosts who died in the castle from obtaining a valuable item on their death anniversaries, otherwise the ghosts will gain supernatural powers and immortality (e.g. The "Devilish Debutante" seeks a necklace or "The Headless Knight" seeks a gauntlet). The antagonist to the contestants is the ghost of Lord MacAbre (Ford Kiernan), Professor MacAbre's villainous ancestor who sets up each game for the contestants. The contestants have until the last stroke of midnight to complete the task.

The contestants' goal is to collect "ectoplasmic residue" of the ghosts in order to gain letters that will eventually spell out the item that the ghost is seeking. The contestants travel to two different rooms around the castle in search of the ectoplasm, but are placed into games by Lord MacAbre. There are at least three different games per episodes, including a memory game in which the contestants must match sound effects to their origins and then play them in a certain order; and a game where they have to play a bowling game of sorts involving knocking down skeletons using large rubber balls and mops to guide the balls. Other games include a maze or throwing hula-hoops over statuettes or memorising the features on different statues and placing them all on another statue.

The third game involves a contestant going outside the castle, whether he or she enters the castle's dungeon or the graveyard to complete the third game. However, in the dungeon, they are locked in and must find a key to escape otherwise they remain in the dungeon, unless the other contestants forfeit some of the letters they have gained. In the final game, they enter the room the episode's ghost had died in. Professor MacAbre reveals the letters the contestants have gathered and asks them to spell out the correct item and then must locate it before midnight to win the game. If successful, the ghost will be banished from the castle and the contestants win medals and an "entry" into the Spook Squad, but if they fail then they are haunted by the evil ghost and run out of the castle.
