= Charles Forbes-Leith =

British Army officer and politician (1859–1930)

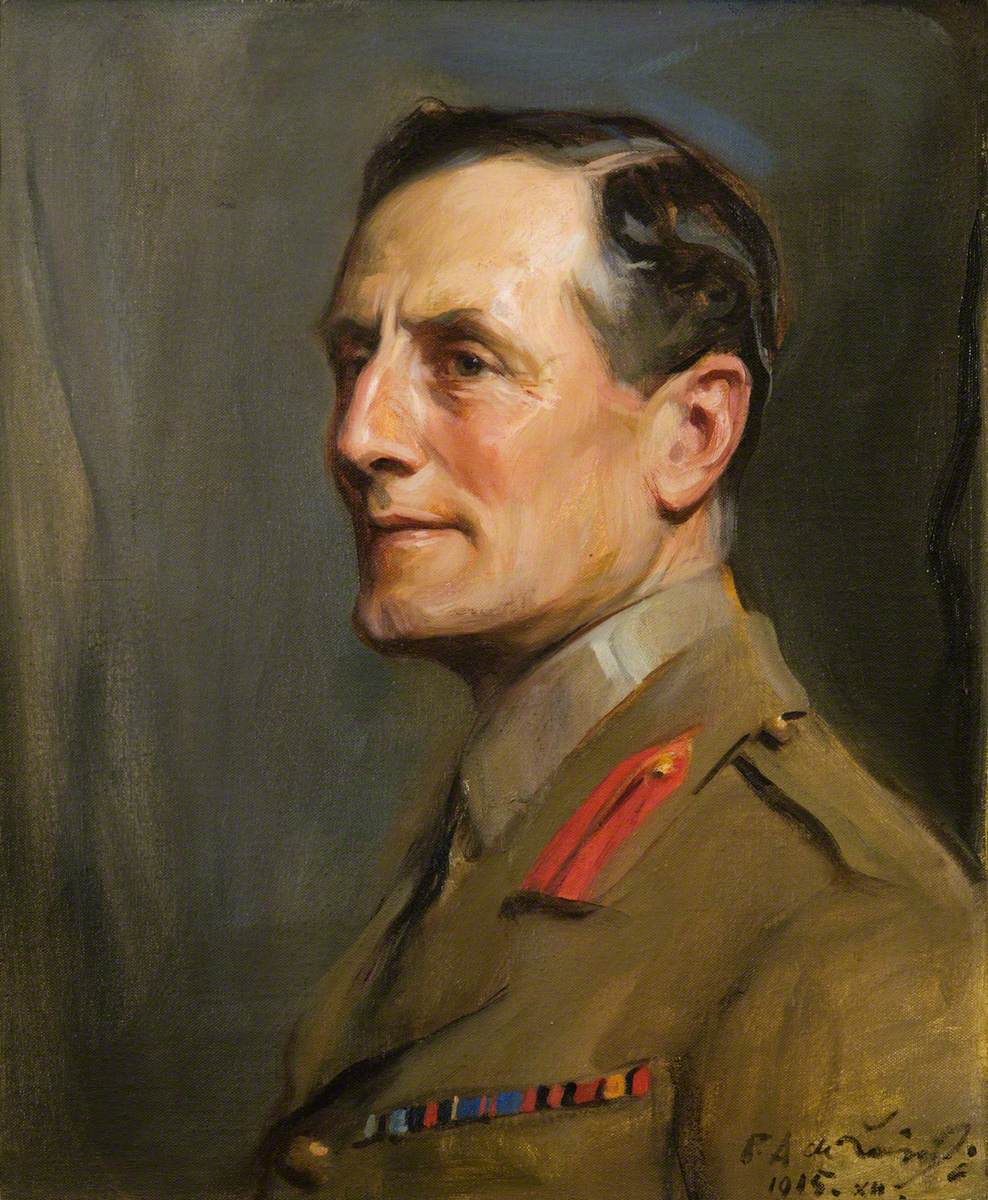
Sir Charles Burn (1859–1930), Later Forbes-Leith, 1st Bt

Colonel Sir Charles Rosdew Forbes-Leith, 1st Baronet (20 February 1859 – 2 November 1930), known as Charles Burn until 1923 and as Sir Charles Burn, Bt, between 1923 and 1925, was a British army officer and Conservative Party politician who was member of parliament for Torquay from 1910 to 1923.

== Military ==
Burn served in the 8th Hussars and the 1st Dragoons, before he was transferred to the 3rd (Militia) Battalion of the Gordon Highlanders in 1899. He was seconded for service with the Imperial Yeomanry in South Africa on 31 January 1900, after the outbreak of the Second Boer War, and was in command of a battalion. For his service in South Africa, he was promoted to lieutenant-colonel on 18 October 1902. He later transferred to the Army Reserve, and was Honorary Colonel of the Westminster Dragoons.

== Politics ==
Burn was elected to Parliament at the December 1910 general election and held his seat until it was won by the Liberal Party in 1923. As well as his work with the Conservative Party Burn also joined the British Fascisti upon its formation in 1923 and sat on the Grand Council of what was initially a group with close ties to the right of the Conservative Party. He was also a member of the National Citizens Union, a rightist pressure group.

== Baronetage and family ==
Burn was Aide-de-camp to King George V from 1910 to 1926 and was created a baronet, of Jessfield near Edinburgh in the County of Midlothian, in 1923. Burn was married to the Honourable Ethel Louise Forbes-Leith, daughter of Alexander Forbes-Leith, 1st Baron Leith of Fyvie.They had homes at 77 Cadogan Pl. and Stoodley Knowle, Torquay. When Lord Leith died in 1925 without male heir, thus resulting in the extinction of the title, Burn changed his name by deed poll to Charles Forbes-Leith of Fyvie and was able to inherit the family seat of Fyvie Castle.

Parliament of the United Kingdom
Preceded by Francis Layland-Barratt	Member of Parliament for Torquay; 1910 – 1923	Succeeded by P. Gilchrist Thompson
Baronetage of the United Kingdom
New creation	Baronet (of Jessfield); 1923–1930	Succeeded by Robert Iain Algernon Forbes-Leith
