= HMS Bombay (1828) =

Ship of the line of the Royal Navy

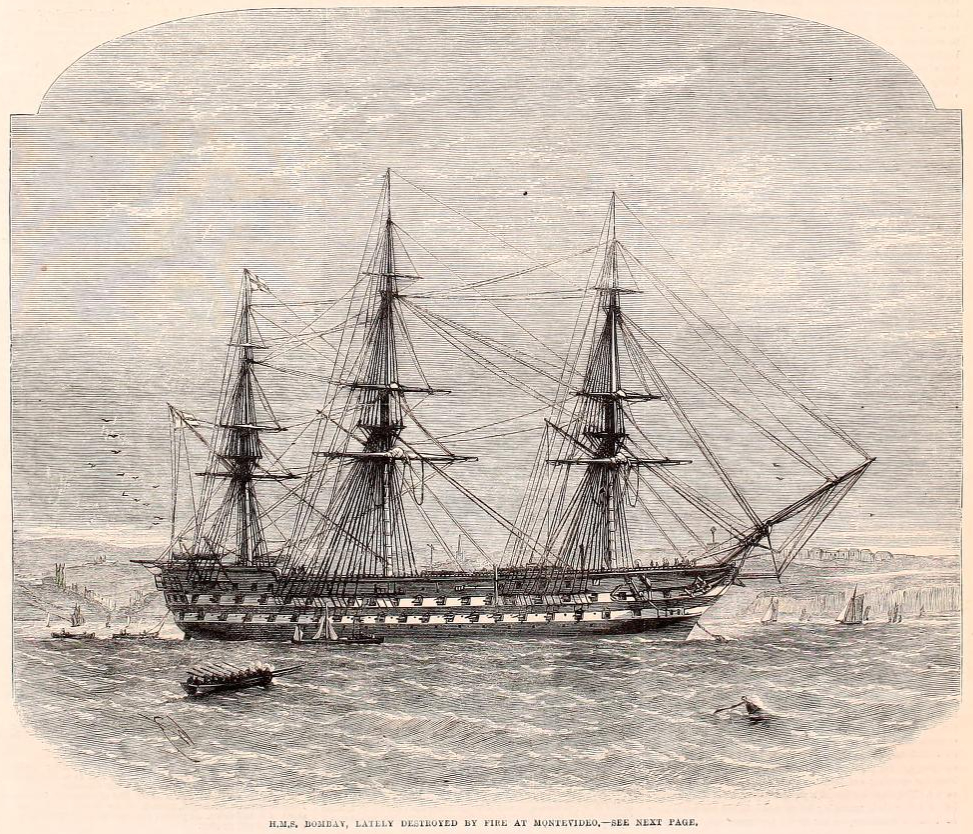
- HMS Bombay

History

United Kingdom
- Name: Bombay
- Ordered: 26 January 1825
- Builder: Bombay Dockyard
- Laid down: May 1826
- Launched: 17 February 1828
- Fate: Caught fire, exploded and sank, 14 December 1864

General characteristics
- Class & type: Canopus-class ship of the line
- Tons burthen: 2,279 bm
- Length: 193 ft 10 in (59.1 m) (gundeck)
- Beam: 52 ft 4.5 in (16.0 m)
- Depth of hold: 22 ft 6 in (6.9 m)
- Propulsion: Sails, since 1861 sails + steam engine
- Sail plan: Full-rigged ship
- Armament: 84 guns: Gundeck: 28 × 32-pounders, 2 × 68-pounder carronades; Upper gundeck: 32 × 24-pounders; Quarterdeck: 6 × 24-pounders, 10 × 32-pounder carronades; Forecastle: 2 × 24-pounders, 4 × 32-pounder carronades

HMS Bombay was an 84-gun second rate ship of the line built for the Royal Navy.

== Construction and career ==
The ship was launched on 17 February 1828 at Bombay Dockyard.

She was fitted with screw propulsion in 1861 at Chatham Dockyard. This was a significant modification and involved cutting the ship in half and inserting a section to lengthen her, as well as fitting a Humphrys, Tennant and Dykes steam engine that gave a speed of 10 knots. Under the command of Captain Colin Andrew Campbell, she was sent to South America as the flagship of Rear-Admiral Charles Elliot.

On 8 December 1864, members of the crew fielded a cricket side to play against the Buenos Aires Cricket Club in the opening of the BACC's new playing field in Parque Tres de Febrero in Palermo, Buenos Aires, located where the Galileo Galilei planetarium is today. That day the BACC defeated the Bombay team by 85 runs to 31.

== Loss ==
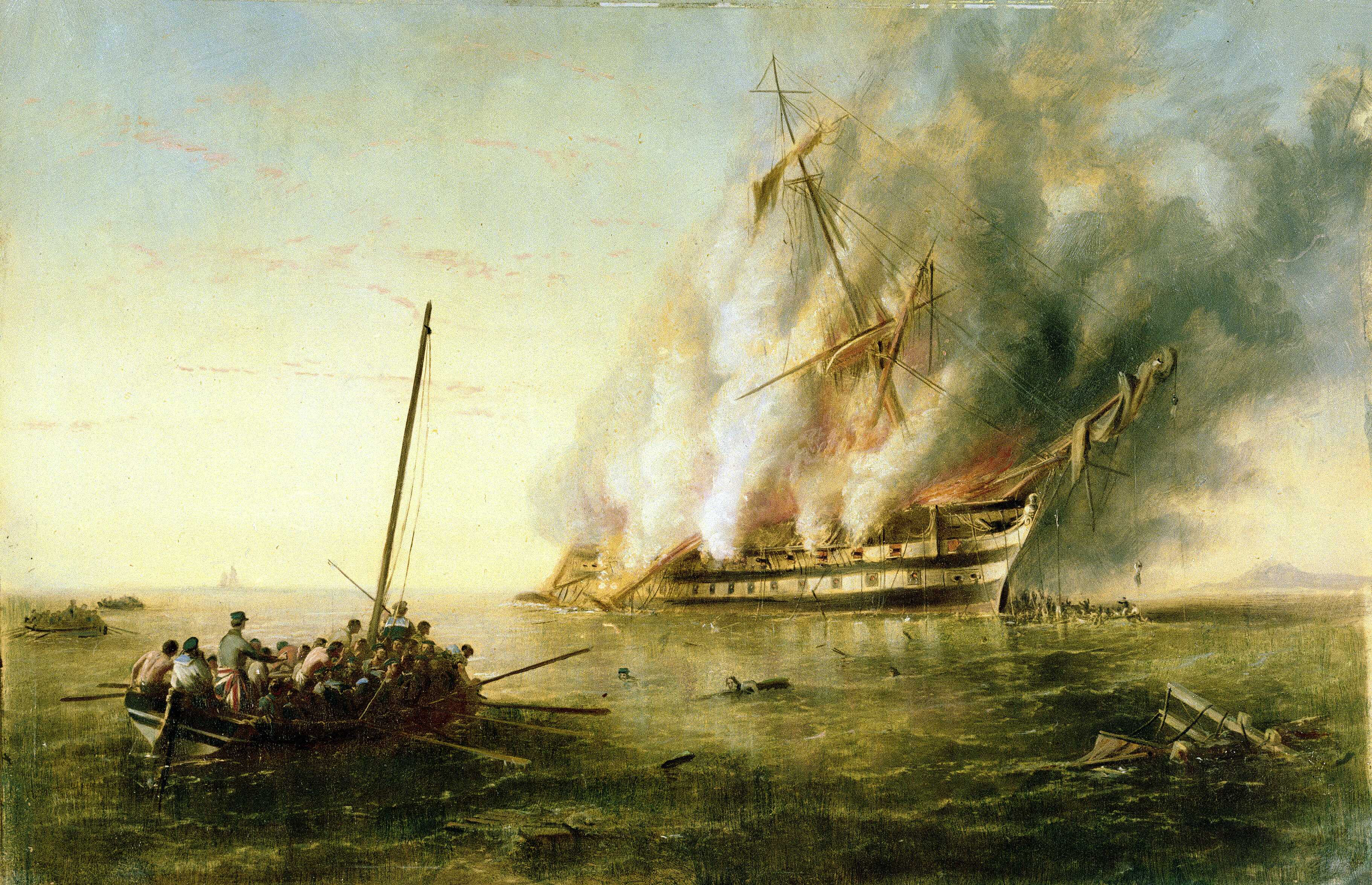
HMS Bombay on fire. A hand-coloured, photographic print of a painting by Richard Brydges Beechey, National Maritime Museum collection.

The ship would be destroyed in a fire on the River Plate, in a freak target practice accident. Her efficient ventilation system spread the fire of unknown origin during the target practice off Uruguay near Isla de Flores near Montevideo in the River Plate on 14 December 1864. destroying her and costing the lives of 93 of her crew of 619.

At the time the ship was under sail, and the engines were not in use. The fire was reported at 3.35pm, having started in the area of the aft-hold. It spread quickly; by 4pm flames were coming out of the hatchways and setting the sails on fire. The ships boats were launched, but many men went into the water; some were killed by the ship's anchors when the cables holding them burnt through and they dropped into the sea. At 8:25pm, the ship's after gunpowder magazine exploded and she quickly sank in shallow water.

Bombay's bowsprit remained visible above the water for some years afterwards, though it had disappeared by 1885.

== See also ==
- Arthur Philpotts, Member of Parliament who was a sub-lieutenant on Bombay when she sank.
- Edmund Poë, Admiral who was serving as a midshipman on-board Bombay the ship sank.
