= 1955 Torquay by-election =

UK Parliamentary by-election

The 1955 Torquay by-election of 15 December 1955 was held after the death of Conservative Member of Parliament (MP) Charles Williams:

== Electoral history ==
The seat was safe, having been won by Williams at the 1955 general election with a majority of over 17,000 votes The seat had been Conservative since Williams gained the seat from the Liberals in 1924. At the 1955 general election, the Labour Party had come second, as it had done at every election since 1945.

General election 1955: Torquay
Party	Candidate	Votes	%	±%
Conservative	Charles Williams	29,777	60.36	
Labour	Robert Briscoe	12,547	25.43	
Liberal	Peter Bessell	7,012	14.21	
Majority		17,230	34.93	
Turnout		49,336	75.49	
Conservative hold		Swing		

== Candidates ==
- Frederic Bennett was the Conservative candidate selected to hold the seat. He was the former MP for Reading North, who had lost his seat at the 1955 general election. His father had been an MP for both the Liberal and Labour parties.
- William Hamling was the new Labour candidate. He defeated Thomas Ponsonby (grandson of the Lord Ponsonby who lead the Labour Party in the House of Lords in the early 1930s) and C. B. Attlee (nephew of the former Labour leader and Prime Minister, Clement Attlee).
- Peter Bessell had been selected at the last minute to be the Liberal candidate at the 1955 general election and was re-selected for the by-election.

== Result ==
The Conservative Party held the seat with a reduced majority.

Torquay by-election, 15 December 1955
Party	Candidate	Votes	%	±%
Conservative	Frederic Bennett	20,964	50.98	−9.38
Labour	William Hamling	10,383	25.25	−0.18
Liberal	Peter Bessell	9,775	23.77	+9.56
Majority		10,581	25.73	−9.20
Turnout		41,122		
Conservative hold		Swing		
