= Charles Williams (Torquay MP) =

English politician

The Right Honourable Charles Williams PC
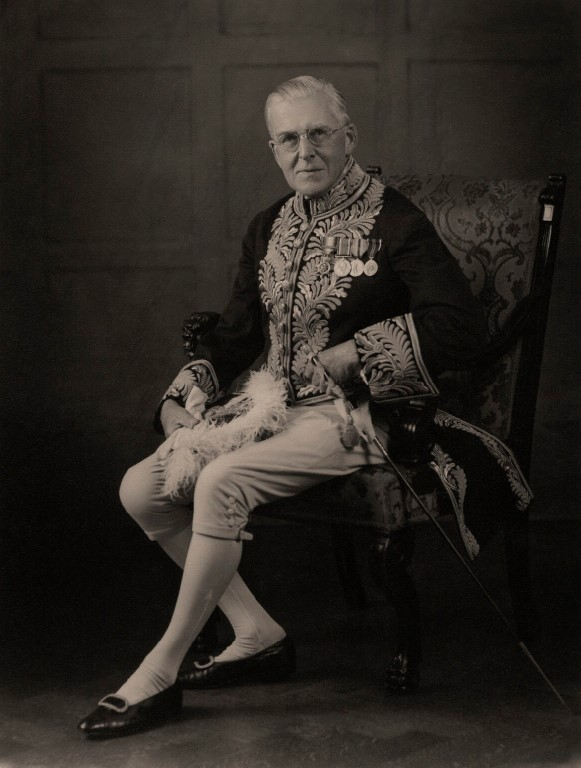
- Portrait by Hay Wrightson, 1948

Deputy Speaker of the House of Commons Chairman of Ways and Means
- In office 30 May 1945 – 16 August 1945
- Speaker: Douglas Clifton Brown
- Preceded by: James Milner
- Succeeded by: James Milner

Deputy Chairman of Ways and Means
- In office 9 March 1943 – 30 May 1945
- Speaker: Douglas Clifton Brown
- Preceded by: James Milner
- Succeeded by: Charles MacAndrew

Member of Parliament for Torquay
- In office 29 October 1924 – 28 October 1955
- Preceded by: P. Gilchrist Thompson
- Succeeded by: Frederic Bennett

Member of Parliament for Tavistock
- In office 14 December 1918 – 15 November 1922
- Preceded by: John Spear
- Succeeded by: Maxwell Thornton

Personal details
- Born: 21 April 1886
- Died: 28 October 1955 (aged 69)
- Party: Conservative

Charles Williams (21 April 1886 – 28 October 1955) was a Conservative Party politician in England. He was member of parliament (MP) for constituencies in Devon from 1918 to 1922, and from 1924 to 1955. On 1 January 1952 he was appointed a member of the Privy Council, in recognition of his political and public service.

== Political career ==
He was elected to the House of Commons on his first attempt, as a Coalition Conservative candidate for the Tavistock constituency at the 1918 general election, defeating his Liberal Party opponent with a majority of 13% of the votes. However, at the 1922 general election, the Liberal took the seat on a swing of over 10%.

At the 1923 election, he stood in Torquay, where he lost narrowly to the Liberal candidate. He won the seat at the 1924 general election, and represented Torquay in Parliament for 31 years, until his death aged 69, a few months after being returned for the ninth time at the 1955 election.

Parliament of the United Kingdom
Preceded by Sir John Spear	Member of Parliament for Tavistock; 1918–1922	Succeeded by Maxwell Thornton
Preceded by P. Gilchrist Thompson	Member of Parliament for Torquay; 1924–1955	Succeeded by Sir Frederic Bennett
