= Arthur Philpotts =

Arthur Stephens Philpotts (13 October 1844– 12 August 1920) was a British naval officer and politician.

Born at Bishopstowe in Torquay, Philpotts was educated at Chudleigh Grammar School, and then the Royal Academy, Gosport. He joined the Royal Navy in 1858.

He was serving on-board HMS Bombay as a sub-lieutenant when the ship caught fire and sank off Montevideo in December 1864 with the loss of 92 crew. He serving with the British expedition to Abyssinia, winning a mention in dispatches. He also served in the suppression of the African slave trade.

He became a commander in 1880 and was a divisional officer in the coastguard from 1882 until 1888. He retired in 1895, gaining appointment as a captain. In the 1895 UK general election, Philpotts was elected for the Conservative Party in Torquay, serving until his retirement in 1900.
