= P. Gilchrist Thompson =

English publisher and Liberal Party politician

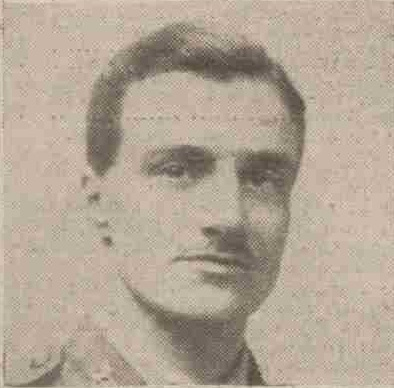
Gilchrist Thompson, circa 1923

Piers Gilchrist Thompson (10 May 1893 – 7 February 1969) was an English publisher and Liberal Party politician.

== Family and education ==
Thompson was born in Battersea, the son of the Reverend Canon Henry Percy Thompson and his wife Lillian (née Thomas). He was educated at Winchester College and Brasenose College, Oxford where he obtained his MA degree. He was married to Hester Barnes and they had two sons and a daughter.

== Career ==
On 26 August 1914, shortly after the British entry into the First World War, aged 21 years, Thompson was commissioned into the 4th Battalion The Queen's Own (Royal West Kent Regiment). He ended his military service with the rank of captain. From the early 1920s, Thompson was looking for a career in publishing. He invested in the publishing house established by Jonathan Cape and became a junior director in the firm. After 1923, he was a Treasurer of Jonathan Cape. He also worked with Hamish Hamilton who founded his own publishing house. He later became a partner in the publishing company of Lovat Dickson and Thompson Ltd.

== Politics ==
=== Torquay ===
Thompson first stood for Parliament at the 1922 general election. Torquay Liberal Association had had trouble in finding a suitable candidate after the 1918 general election. They consulted the Liberal Chief Whip and party headquarters in 1919 but no nominee came forward until Thompson was adopted as Liberal candidate for Torquay in 1922. At the 1918 general election the Liberal candidate, Captain Russell Cooke, had finished a poor third behind Coalition Conservative and Labour opponents, gaining just 15% of the poll.

=== 1922-1923 ===
In 1922, Thompson faced a straight fight against the sitting Tory MP, Colonel Charles Rosdew Burn, who was a distinguished ex-soldier and an Aide-de-camp to the King. In the absence of a Labour candidate Burn's majority was reduced from the 10,039 he had obtained in 1918 to 1,251 or 4.4% of the poll.

Burn stood down from the House of Commons at the 1923 general election. Thompson had another straight fight in Torquay this time against the new Conservative candidate Charles Williams. In a tight contest, Thompson emerged as the winner by the narrow majority of 372 votes, just 1.2% of the total votes cast.

=== 1924 ===
At the 1924 general election Thompson faced the intervention of a Labour candidate, Arthur Moyle, who later went on to be MP for Stourbridge. Labour's decision to stand was criticised by the Liberals as serving only to split the anti-Tory vote. Charles Williams renewed his attack on the seat for the Conservatives. The Tory revival in the country at large was repeated in Torquay and Williams obtained 55% of the poll to win by a majority of 6,161 over Thompson. Moyle came bottom of the poll, losing his deposit but it can hardly be contended that his intervention cost Thompson the seat. The level of support for Williams was too great and the Liberal Party's decline was a national phenomenon.

=== 1924-1940 ===
After he lost in 1924 Thompson declined to stand again in Torquay. The local Liberal Association did however approach him again when they were looking for a new candidate after the 1929 general election but he was unwilling to take it on. Thompson made his home in Shipbourne near Tonbridge in Kent and in 1936 accepted an invitation to become Liberal candidate for the Sevenoaks Division of Kent, although he never contested an election in the seat. In fact he never stood for Parliament again. He maintained his connection with Liberalism however and was sometime Honorary Secretary of the Home Counties Liberal Federation. He was also a member of the executive committee of the Proportional Representation Society.

== Death ==
Thompson died on 7 February 1969 aged 75 years.

Parliament of the United Kingdom
| Preceded by Charles Forbes-Leith | Member of Parliament for Torquay; 1923 – 1924 | Succeeded by Charles Williams |
