= Frederic Bennett =

British politician (1918–2002)

The Right Honourable Sir Frederic Bennett DL
- Bennett in 1968

Member of Parliament for Torbay (Torquay 1955–1974)
- In office 16 December 1955 – 18 May 1987
- Preceded by: Charles Williams
- Succeeded by: Rupert Allason

Member of Parliament for Reading North
- In office 25 October 1951 – 6 May 1955
- Preceded by: Kim Mackay
- Succeeded by: Constituency abolished

Personal details
- Born: Frederic Mackarness Bennett; 2 December 1918
- Died: 14 September 2002 (aged 83) Aberangell, Wales
- Party: Conservative
- Spouse: Marion Patricia Burnham (m. 1945)
- Parent: Ernest Bennett (father)
- Education: Westminster School
- Alma mater: Lincoln's Inn
- Occupation: Barrister; journalist; MP
- Awards: Knight Bachelor (1964)

Military service
- Branch/service: British Army
- Years of service: 1939–1946
- Rank: Major
- Unit: Middlesex Yeomanry; Royal Artillery

Sir Frederic Mackarness Bennett DL (2 December 1918 – 14 September 2002) was a British journalist, author, barrister and Conservative politician who served as a Member of Parliament for 35 years. He was appointed a Privy Counsellor in 1985, and a Deputy Lieutenant for Greater London in 1990. He was also Lord of the manor of Mawddwy in Wales.

== Early years ==
The second son of Sir Ernest Nathaniel Bennett, (died 1947) of Cwmllecoediog, Aberangell, Wales, by his wife Marguerite (née Kleinwort), Bennett was educated at Westminster School, and Lincoln's Inn, and was called to the English Bar in November 1946. He subsequently practised as an Advocate in the High Court of Southern Rhodesia from March 1947, and in 1947 he made the first overland car journey from South Africa to England.

From 1947 to 1949 he was an Official Observer in the Greek Civil War, becoming diplomatic correspondent for the Birmingham Post from 1950 to 1952. Later a director in various financial and industrial institutions in the United Kingdom and overseas, he was also an underwriter at Lloyd's.

== Military ==
In 1939 Bennett enlisted in the Middlesex Yeomanry. He was commissioned as an officer into the Royal Artillery in 1940; commended for gallantry in 1941; was Military Experimental Officer in the Petroleum Warfare Department, 1943–1946, then released to reserve with the permanent rank of Major.

== Political career ==
At the 1945 general election, Bennett was an unsuccessful candidate in the Burslem constituency, in Staffordshire. At the 1950 general election, he stood in the Birmingham Ladywood constituency, again unsuccessfully.

The following year, at the 1951 general election, he was finally elected to the House of Commons as Member of Parliament (MP) for Reading North. When that constituency was abolished for the general election in May 1955, Bennett stood for in election in the new Reading seat, but lost by 238 votes to Labour's Ian Mikardo, the outgoing MP for the abolished Reading South constituency.

In October 1955, the MP for Torquay, Charles Williams, died after more than thirty years as the town's MP. Bennett was selected as Conservative candidate for the resulting by-election, which he won with a majority of over 10,000 votes. He represented Torquay until the constituency was abolished for the February 1974 general election, when he was returned to Parliament for the new Torbay constituency. He held that seat until he retired from the Commons at the 1987 general election.

The Independent described Bennett as an "unabashed, not to say pugnacious right-wing conservative". He was Parliamentary Private Secretary to Reginald Maudling from 1953 to 1955; to the Minister of Supply 1956–1957; the Paymaster General 1957–1959; to the President of the Board of Trade, 1959–1961. He was Leader of the UK Delegation, and Chairman of the Council of Europe and Western European Union Assemblies, 1979–1987. He was also sometime chairman of the European Democrats political group in the Council of Europe.

Bennett headed the list of the Secretariat for the European Freedom Campaign, an anti-communist group established in London at an Inaugural Rally at Westminster Central Hall on 10 December 1988. This group's co-ordinating committee consisted almost exclusively of representatives from countries behind the Iron Curtain.

In 1997, Bennett announced he would vote for the Labour Party in that year's general election, saying that because of the reforms of New Labour, the party were "no longer Marxist socialists".

== Other interests ==
Bennett had wide-ranging interests: he was a member of The Primrose League, and their guest of honour at a dinner held on 5 March 1979 in the Cholmondely Room, House of Lords, hosted by The Lord Mowbray and Stourton. He was sometime President of the Anglo-Turkish Society - he had an Honorary Doctorate of Law from the University of Istanbul, 1984, and was granted the Freedom of the City of Ankara in 1992. He was a member of the Anglo-Polish Society, the Council of the Baltic Sea States, the Estonian Association, the Anglo-Jordanian Society, the Pakistan Society, and was a Vice-President of the European-Atlantic Group. Between 1959 and 1984 - the year he was also made a Freeman of the City of London - he attended twenty of the yearly Bilderberg Group conferences. He was a member of the group's Steering Committee. He was the recipient of a small catalogue of foreign honours and awards of merit.

In 1976, Bennett assisted George Kennedy Young in creating the private army 'Unison'.

== Personal life and death ==
He married in 1945, Marion Patricia, daughter of Major Cecil Burnham, OBE, Fellow of the Royal College of Surgeons (Edinburgh).

In 1997, Bennett listed his residence as Aberangell. He died there on 14 September 2002, aged 83.

== Publications ==
- Bennett, Frederic, Speaking Frankly, London, 1960.
- Bennett, Sir Frederic, Détente and Security in Europe, London, 1976.
- Bennett, Sir Frederic, Ulster - Fear is the Key, London, 1978.
- Bennett, Sir Frederic, China and European Security, London, 1979, (2nd ed. 1980).
- Bennett, Sir Frederic, Reds under the Bed, or the Enemy at the Gate - and Within, London, 1979, (3rd edition, 1982).
- Bennett, Sir Frederic, Impact of Individual & Corporate Incentives on Productivity and Standard of Living, London, 1980.
- Bennett, Sir Frederic, Electoral Reform, London, 1996.
- Bennett, Sir Frederic, Kashmir - Still Speaking Frankly, London, 1997.

Parliament of the United Kingdom
Preceded by Kim Mackay	Member of Parliament for Reading North; 1951–1955	Constituency abolished
Preceded by Charles Williams	Member of Parliament for Torquay; 1955–Feb 1974	Constituency abolished
New constituency	Member of Parliament for Torbay; Feb 1974–1987	Succeeded by Rupert Allason
