= Hubert Medland =

British politician (1881–1964)

Hubert Moses Medland (1 July 1881 – 11 December 1964) was a British Labour Party politician.

Born in Okehampton, Medland was educated at Tavistock Grammar School before becoming a civil servant. He also joined the Labour Party, and served on Plymouth City Council from 1923, including a term as Lord Mayor of Plymouth in 1935. He stood unsuccessfully in Torquay at both the 1929 and 1931 United Kingdom general elections. In 1938, he became the president of the British Waterworks Association, and during World War II he was the civil defence regional commissioner for the south west.

Medland was elected as Member of Parliament (MP) for the Plymouth Drake constituency at the 1945 general election and held the seat until the constituency was abolished for the 1950 general election. He then served on the South West Electricity Board and the South West Regional Hospital Board.

Medland was known locally as "Stormy Medland" for his direct manner. Medland Crescent in Southway Ward in Plymouth is named after Hubert Medland. This is close to Moses Court named after Jimmy Moses, the first Labour Party Member of Parliament for Plymouth.

Parliament of the United Kingdom
Preceded by Henry Guest	Member of Parliament for Plymouth Drake; 1945–1950	Constituency abolished
