= Richard Mallock =

British politician, died 1900

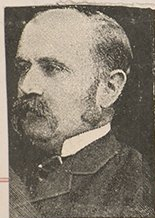
Richard Mallock

Richard Mallock (1843 – 28 June 1900) was a British Army officer and politician. Mallock served as a member of the House of Commons for Torquay from 1886 to 1895.

== Early life and military career ==
Mallock born in Cockington Court, Torquay. He studied at Harrow School and the Royal Military Academy in Woolwich. He then served as a lieutenant in the Royal Artillery from 1865 to 1876.

== Post-military career ==
After leaving service, he was a justice of the peace. At the 1885 UK general election, he stood unsuccessfully for the Conservative Party in Torquay, but he gained the seat in 1886, and held it until his retirement, in 1895.

== Death ==
In 1900, Mallock collapsed and died during a biking holiday to Scotland.
