= Alexander Forbes-Leith, 1st Baron Leith of Fyvie =

The Right Honourable The Lord Leith of Fyvie JP DL
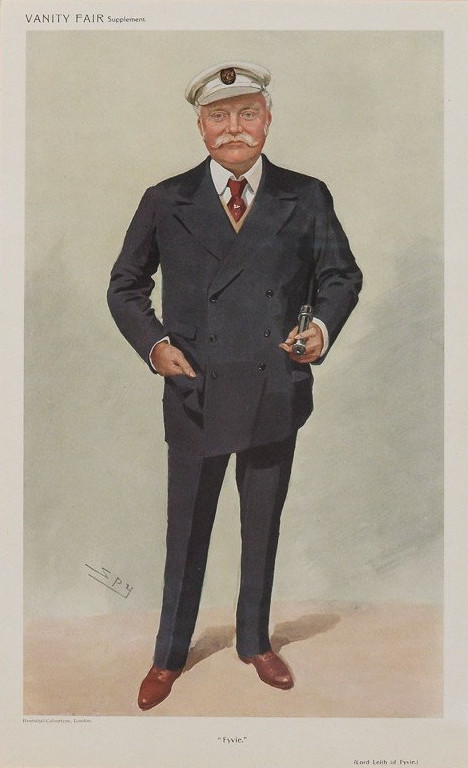
- "Fyvie", caricature by Spy in Vanity Fair, 1909.
- Born: 6 August 1847; Aberdeen, Scotland
- Died: 14 November 1925 (aged 78); Hartwell House, Buckinghamshire

Alexander John Forbes-Leith, 1st Baron Leith of Fyvie JP DL (6 August 1847 – 14 November 1925), was a Scottish Royal Navy officer and US steel magnate.

== Early life and education ==
=== Family and childhood ===
Alexander was the youngest of four children born to Rear-Admiral John James Leith and his wife and step-niece, Margaret Forbes. He was born at Aberdeen on 6 August 1847.

His father, John James Leith, was the son of General Alexander Leith Hay and nephew of Sir Andrew Leith Hay.

Margaret Forbes was the daughter and heiress of Alexander Forbes, a descendant of Duncan Forbes (the second son of the second Lord Forbes).

John and Margaret married on 27 June 1843, four years before Alexander's birth. At the time, John was 55 and Margaret was 23. In 1854, John died at the age of 66, leaving behind Margaret and their four children. At the time, Alexander was eight years old.

=== Education ===
He was educated at Berlin, Prussia, the École spéciale militaire de Saint-Cyr and Dr. Burney's Naval Academy at Gosport, Hampshire. He later assumed the additional surname of Forbes.

== Royal Navy career ==
Forbes-Leith joined the Royal Navy in 1860 with the rank of naval cadet. He was rated midshipman in 1861 and fought in the New Zealand Wars between 1864 and 1865. During his time in the Royal Navy he was awarded the Royal Humane Society Medal for saving a boy from drowning. He became a lieutenant in 1869 but retired from the service in 1872.

He first served on the ship HMS Britannia and was later transferred to HMS Zealous.

== Marriage and move to the United States ==
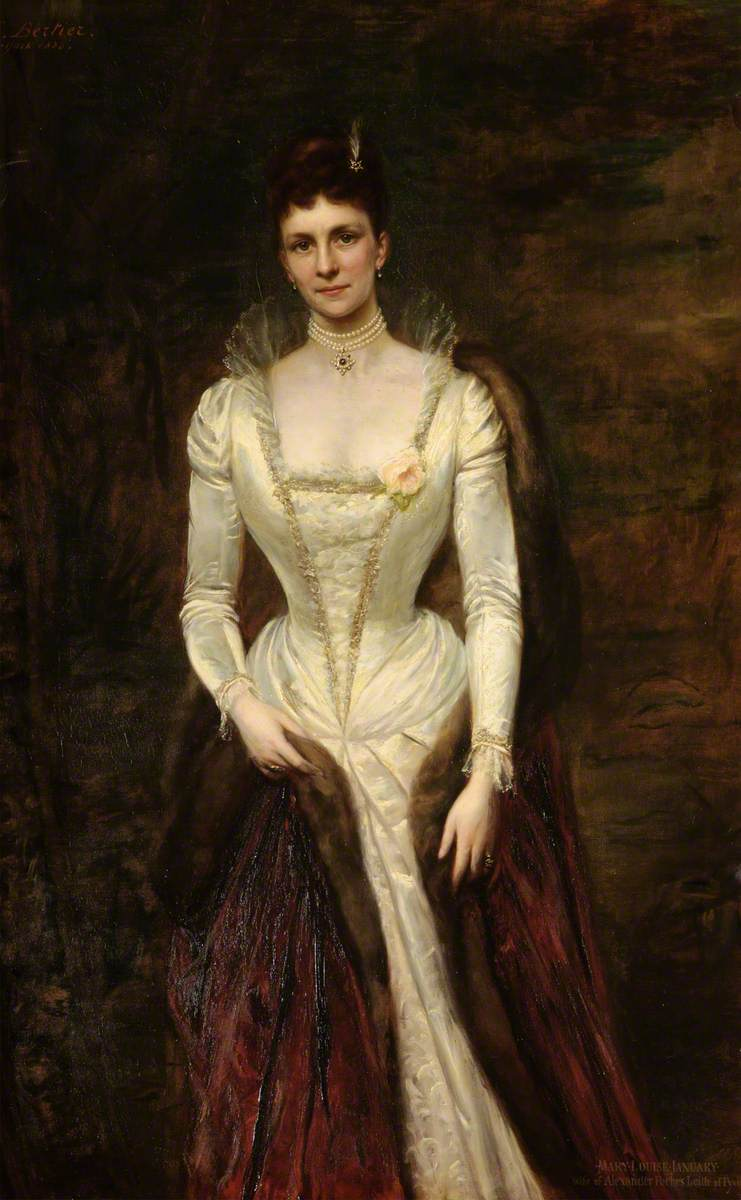
Portrait of Lady Forbes-Leith, painted by Francisque-Edouard Bertier.

Lord Leith of Fyvie married Marie Louise January of St Louis, Missouri.

== Business career ==
Forbes-Leith married the daughter of a director of an Illinois steel mill in 1871. He worked his way up in to become president of the Joliet Iron and Steel Company, which later merged into Illinois Steel and eventually the United States Steel Corporation, of which Leith became a director. He was also a partner in a merchant bank.

In 1889, Forbes-Leith used the fortune he had made in the steel industry to acquire Fyvie Castle in Aberdeenshire for £175,000 and invested large sums in its restoration. He was also a Justice of the Peace and Deputy Lieutenant of Aberdeenshire. In 1905 he was raised to the peerage as Baron Leith of Fyvie, of Fyvie in the County of Aberdeen.

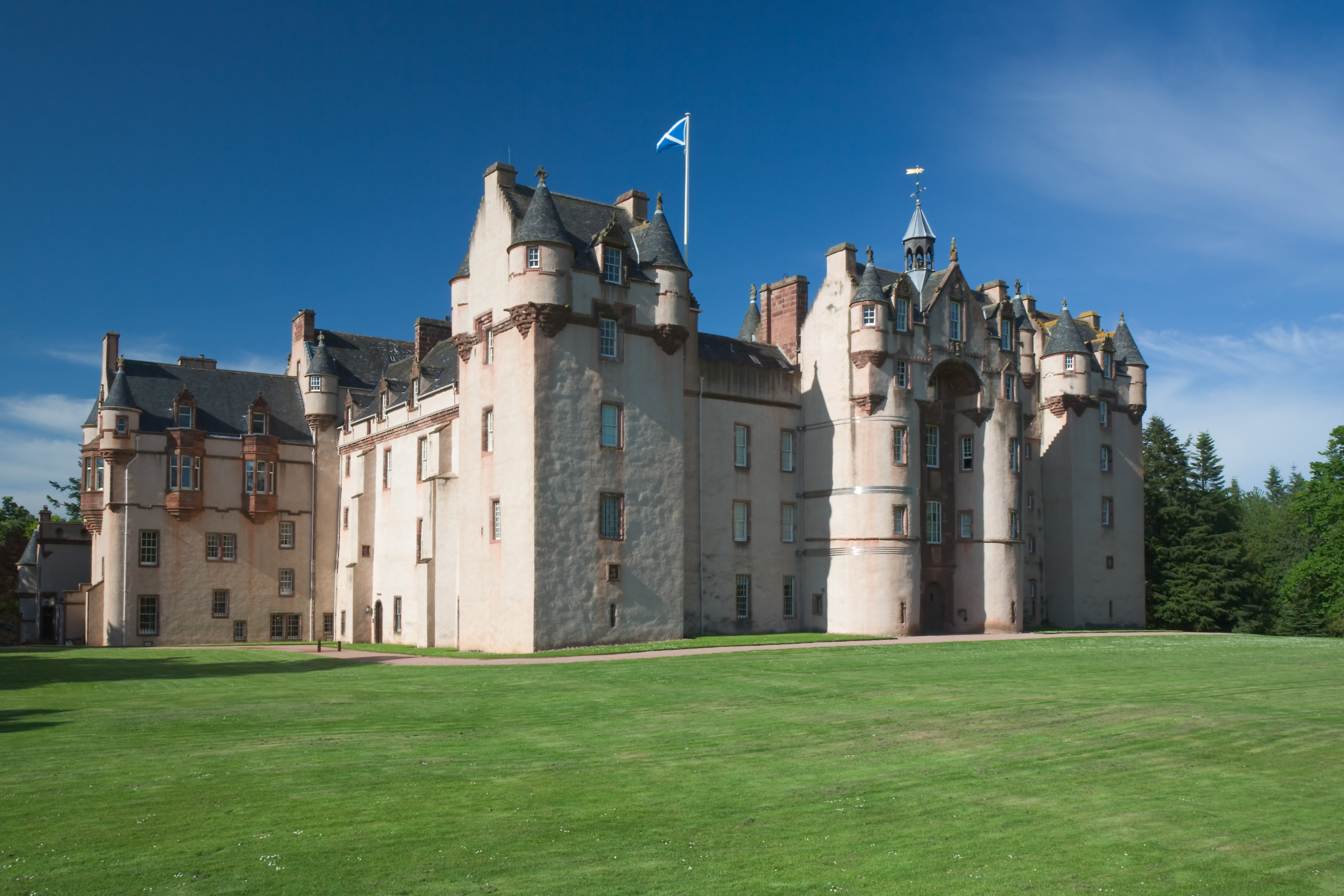
Fyvie Castle, Aberdeenshire.

== Family ==
They had one son and two daughters (of which the youngest died as an infant). His only son Percy Forbes-Leith died while serving in the Second Boer War.

== Death and legacy ==
Leith died at Hartwell House, Buckinghamshire, in November 1925, aged 78, and was cremated at Golders Green Crematorium. The barony died with him. Lady Leith of Fyvie died at Hartwell House in June 1930, aged 82. Lord Leith's estates, including Fyvie Castle, passed to his daughter and only surviving child, the Honourable Ethel, wife of the former Conservative Member of Parliament Sir Charles Rosdew Burn, 1st Baronet. In 1925, the latter assumed the surname and arms of Forbes-Leith of Fyvie, for himself, his wife and son, according to the terms of his father-in-law's will (see Forbes baronets for more information on the baronetcy).

Peerage of the United Kingdom
New creation	Baron Leith of Fyvie; 1905–1925	Extinct
