= Torquay (constituency) =

Parliamentary constituency in the United Kingdom, 1885–1974

- Former county constituency for the House of Commons

1885–February 1974
- Seats: one
- Created from: East Devon
- Replaced by: Torbay

Torquay was a county constituency in Devon, South West England, which returned one Member of Parliament to the House of Commons of the Parliament of the United Kingdom.

It was created for the 1885 general election and abolished for the February 1974 general election. The area it represented became part of the Torbay constituency.

== Boundaries ==
1885–1918: The Borough of Dartmouth and the Sessional Division of Paignton.

1918–1950: The Boroughs of Dartmouth and Torquay, the Urban Districts of Brixham and Paignton, the parishes of Churston Ferrers, Kingswear, Marldon, and Stoke Gabriel in the Rural District of Totnes, and the parishes of Cockington and Stokeinteignhead in the Rural District of Newton Abbot.

1950–1974: The Borough of Torquay, the Urban Districts of Brixham and Paignton, and the parishes of Churston Ferrers and Kingswear in the Rural District of Totnes.

== Members of Parliament ==
Election	Member	Party
1885	Lewis McIver	Liberal
1886	Richard Mallock	Conservative
1895	Arthur Philpotts	Conservative
1900	Francis Layland-Barratt	Liberal
Dec 1910	Charles Burn	Liberal Unionist
1912	Charles Burn	Conservative Party
1918	Charles Burn	Coalition Conservative
1922	Charles Burn	Conservative
1923	Piers Thompson	Liberal
1924	Charles Williams	Conservative
1955 by-election	Frederic Bennett	Conservative
Feb 1974	constituency abolished	

== Election results ==
=== Elections in the 1880s ===
General election 1885: Torquay
Party	Candidate	Votes	%	±%
Liberal	Lewis McIver	3,509	52.6	
Conservative	Richard Mallock	3,161	47.4	
Majority		348	5.2	
Turnout		6,670	86.2	
Registered electors		7,738		
Liberal win (new seat)				

General election 1886: Torquay
Party	Candidate	Votes	%	±%
Conservative	Richard Mallock	3,135	50.6	+3.2
Liberal Unionist	Lewis McIver	3,055	49.4	−3.2
Majority		80	1.2	N/A
Turnout		6,190	80.0	−6.2
Registered electors		7,738		
Conservative gain from Liberal		Swing	+3.2	

=== Elections in the 1890s ===
General election 1892: Torquay
Party	Candidate	Votes	%	±%
Conservative	Richard Mallock	4,157	52.5	+1.9
Liberal	Arthur Hayter	3,763	47.5	−1.9
Majority		394	5.0	+3.8
Turnout		7,920	84.2	+4.2
Registered electors		9,404		
Conservative hold		Swing	+1.9	

General election 1895: Torquay
Party	Candidate	Votes	%	±%
Conservative	Arthur Philpotts	4,205	51.1	−1.4
Liberal	Francis Layland-Barratt	4,030	48.9	+1.4
Majority		175	2.2	−2.8
Turnout		8,235	82.0	−2.2
Registered electors		10,039		
Conservative hold		Swing	−1.4	

=== Elections in the 1900s ===
General election 1900: Torquay
Party	Candidate	Votes	%	±%
Liberal	Francis Layland-Barratt	4,020	50.8	+1.9
Conservative	James Reginald Lea Rankin	3,891	49.2	−1.9
Majority		129	1.6	N/A
Turnout		7,911	84.9	+2.9
Registered electors		9,313		
Liberal gain from Conservative		Swing	+1.9	

Layland-Barratt

General election 1906: Torquay
Party	Candidate	Votes	%	±%
Liberal	Francis Layland-Barratt	4,856	52.5	+1.7
Conservative	Henry Lopes	4,396	47.5	−1.7
Majority		460	5.0	+3.4
Turnout		9,252	89.5	+4.6
Registered electors		10,343		
Liberal hold		Swing	+1.7	

=== Elections in the 1910s ===
General election January 1910: Torquay
Party	Candidate	Votes	%	±%
Liberal	Francis Layland-Barratt	5,104	50.1	−2.4
Conservative	Henry Lopes	5,093	49.9	+2.4
Majority		11	0.2	−4.8
Turnout		10,197	90.7	+1.2
Registered electors		11,241		
Liberal hold		Swing	−2.4	

General election December 1910: Torquay
Party	Candidate	Votes	%	±%
Liberal Unionist	Charles Burn	5,101	50.6	+0.7
Liberal	Francis Layland-Barratt	4,971	49.4	−0.7
Majority		130	1.2	N/A
Turnout		10,072	89.6	−1.1
Registered electors		11,241		
Liberal Unionist gain from Liberal		Swing	+0.7	

General Election 1914–15:

Another General Election was required to take place before the end of 1915. The political parties had been making preparations for an election to take place and by July 1914, the following candidates had been selected;

- Unionist: Charles Burn
- Liberal: Thomas Devereux Pile

General election 1918: Torquay
Party		Candidate	Votes	%	±%
C	Unionist	Charles Burn	14,068	66.2	+15.6
	Labour	Alfred Trestrail	4,029	18.9	New
	Liberal	Russell Cooke	3,173	14.9	−34.5
Majority			10,039	47.3	+46.1
Turnout			21,270	65.3	−24.3
	Unionist hold		Swing	+25.1	
C indicates candidate endorsed by the coalition government.

=== Elections in the 1920s ===
General election 1922: Torquay
Party	Candidate	Votes	%	±%
Unionist	Charles Burn	14,676	52.2	−14.0
Liberal	Piers Thompson	13,425	47.8	+32.9
Majority		1,251	4.4	−42.9
Turnout		28,101	78.5	+13.2
Unionist hold		Swing	-23.5	

General election 1923: Torquay
Party	Candidate	Votes	%	±%
Liberal	Piers Thompson	15,294	50.6	+2.8
Unionist	Charles Williams	14,922	49.4	−2.8
Majority		372	1.2	N/A
Turnout		30,216	80.0	+1.5
Liberal gain from Unionist		Swing	+2.8	

General election 1924: Torquay
Party	Candidate	Votes	%	±%
Unionist	Charles Williams	18,119	55.2	+5.8
Liberal	Piers Thompson	11,958	36.4	−14.2
Labour	Arthur Moyle	2,752	8.4	New
Majority		6,161	18.8	N/A
Turnout		32,829	84.4	+4.4
Unionist gain from Liberal		Swing	+10.0	

General election 1929: Torquay
Party	Candidate	Votes	%	±%
Unionist	Charles Williams	21,690	49.7	−5.5
Liberal	Richard Acland	16,337	37.5	+1.1
Labour	Hubert Medland	5,576	12.8	+4.4
Majority		5,353	12.2	−6.6
Turnout		43,603	81.7	−2.7
Unionist hold		Swing	-3.3	

=== Elections in the 1930s ===
General election 1931: Torquay
Party	Candidate	Votes	%	±%
Conservative	Charles Williams	34,690	82.5	+32.8
Labour	Hubert Medland	7,351	17.5	+4.7
Majority		27,339	65.03	+52.8
Turnout		42,041	74.6	−7.1
Conservative hold		Swing		

General election 1935: Torquay
Party	Candidate	Votes	%	±%
Conservative	Charles Williams	27,008	63.6	−18.9
Liberal	Harry Samways	9,073	21.4	New
Labour	F Scardifield	6,387	15.0	−2.5
Majority		17,935	42.2	−22.8
Turnout		42,468	71.0	−3.6
Conservative hold		Swing		

=== Election in the 1940s ===
General Election 1939–40: Another General Election was required to take place before the end of 1940. The political parties had been making preparations for an election to take place from 1939 and by the end of this year, the following candidates had been selected;

- Conservative: Charles Williams
- Liberal: Hugo Keene
- Labour: W W Blaylock

General election 1945: Torquay
Party	Candidate	Votes	%	±%
Conservative	Charles Williams	25,479	48.9	−14.7
Labour	George Cornes	13,590	26.1	+11.1
Liberal	Gorley Putt	13,003	25.0	+3.6
Majority		11,889	22.8	−19.4
Turnout		52,072	71.4	+0.4
Conservative hold		Swing		

=== Elections in the 1950s ===
General election 1950: Torquay
Party	Candidate	Votes	%	±%
Conservative	Charles Williams	29,153	53.56	
Labour	Robert Briscoe	14,287	26.25	
Liberal	Stuart Townend	10,987	20.19	
Majority		14,866	27.31	
Turnout		54,427	82.83	
Conservative hold		Swing		

General election 1951: Torquay
Party	Candidate	Votes	%	±%
Conservative	Charles Williams	31,441	59.16	
Labour	Robert Briscoe	14,801	27.85	
Liberal	Deryck Abel	6,904	12.99	
Majority		16,640	31.31	
Turnout		53,146	79.97	
Conservative hold		Swing		

General election 1955: Torquay
Party	Candidate	Votes	%	±%
Conservative	Charles Williams	29,777	60.36	
Labour	Robert Briscoe	12,547	25.43	
Liberal	Peter Bessell	7,012	14.21	
Majority		17,230	34.93	
Turnout		49,336	75.49	
Conservative hold		Swing		

1955 Torquay by-election
Party	Candidate	Votes	%	±%
Conservative	Frederic Bennett	20,964	50.98	−9.38
Labour	William Hamling	10,383	25.25	−0.18
Liberal	Peter Bessell	9,775	23.77	+9.56
Majority		10,581	25.73	−9.20
Turnout		41,122		
Conservative hold		Swing		

General election 1959: Torquay
Party	Candidate	Votes	%	±%
Conservative	Frederic Bennett	29,527	56.79	
Labour	William V Cooper	11,784	22.66	
Liberal	Thomas Kellock	10,685	20.55	
Majority		17,743	34.13	
Turnout		51,996	76.91	
Conservative hold		Swing		

=== Elections in the 1960s ===
General election 1964: Torquay
Party	Candidate	Votes	%	±%
Conservative	Frederic Bennett	28,801	52.38	
Liberal	Hugo Brunner	13,652	24.83	
Labour	Thelma W Thompson	12,530	22.79	
Majority		15,149	27.55	
Turnout		54,983	75.04	
Conservative hold		Swing		

General election 1966: Torquay
Party	Candidate	Votes	%	±%
Conservative	Frederic Bennett	28,693	49.44	
Labour	Raymond S Dash	16,594	28.59	
Liberal	Hugo Brunner	12,750	21.97	
Majority		12,099	20.85	
Turnout		58,037	77.40	
Conservative hold		Swing		

=== Election in the 1970s ===
General election 1970: Torquay
Party	Candidate	Votes	%	±%
Conservative	Frederic Bennett	33,996	55.6	+6.2
Labour	Paul ST Bryers	15,948	26.1	−2.5
Liberal	Keith P. Jenkins	11,163	18.3	−3.7
Majority		18,048	29.54	+8.7
Turnout		61,107	73.72	−3.7
Conservative hold		Swing		
