= John Harcombe =

English cricketer

Personal information
- Full name: John Dowie Harcombe
- Born: 13 March 1883; Cape Town, Cape Colony
- Died: 19 July 1954 (aged 71); Taunton, Somerset, England
- Batting: Right-handed
- Bowling: Right-arm slow
- Role: All-rounder

Domestic team information
- Years: Team
- 1905–19: Somerset
- First-class debut: 19 June 1905 Somerset v Lancashire
- Last First-class: 10 June 1919 Somerset v Gloucestershire

Career statistics
Competition	First-class
Matches	7
Runs scored	76
Batting average	7.60
100s/50s	–/–
Top score	29
Balls bowled	144
Wickets	3
Bowling average	44.00
5 wickets in innings	–
10 wickets in match	–
Best bowling	3/51
Catches/stumpings	2/–
- Source: CricketArchive, 20 March 2011

John Dowie Harcombe (13 March 1883 – 19 July 1954) played first-class cricket for Somerset in seven matches stretched across the years from 1905 to 1919. He was born at Cape Town in Cape Colony and died at Taunton, Somerset.

== Cricket career ==
Harcombe was a right-handed lower-order batsman and a right-arm slow bowler. He played for Somerset in three matches in 1905, one more in 1914 and then a final three in 1919. He had limited success both as a batsman and as a bowler. His only wickets were taken in his very first match, against Lancashire in 1905. As a batsman he reached double figures only twice in a dozen innings and his highest score was 29, made batting at No 11 in his second first-class match, against Kent in 1905. Harcombe settled in Kenya and played minor cricket there for the Settlers side in the 1920s and 1930s.

== War service ==
Harcombe enlisted as a soldier with the Somerset Light Infantry in the First World War and was a sergeant when he was commissioned in 1916 as a temporary second lieutenant and transferred to the Devonshire Regiment. Earlier in the same year he had been awarded the Military Medal. In 1917 he was granted the rank of acting captain while serving as an adjutant to the Devonshire Regiment. He was allowed to retain the rank of captain when discharged as a second lieutenant in February 1919.
