= Fyvie Castle =

Castle in Aberdeenshire, Scotland

- Fyvie, Aberdeenshire, Scotland
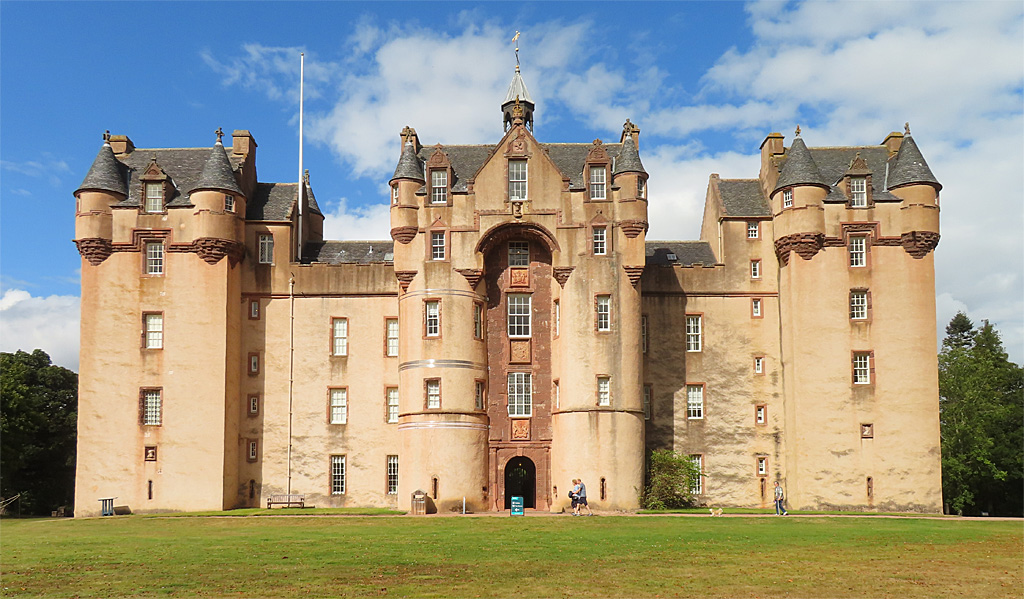
- Fyvie Castle in 2025

Site information
- Website: Castle Website

Location
- Coordinates: 57.4433°N 2.3949°W

Site history
- In use: 13th century

Designations

Inventory of Gardens and Designed Landscapes in Scotland
- Official name: Fyvie Castle
- Designated: 30 June 1987
- Reference no.: GDL00184

Registered battlefield
- Official name: Battle of Fyvie
- Designated: 30 November 2011
- Reference no.: BTL22

Fyvie Castle is a castle in the village of Fyvie, near Turriff in Aberdeenshire, Scotland. The earliest parts of the castle date from the 13th century, and it later passed through the hands of several prominent families, including the Prestons, Setons and Gordons. Since 1984 it has been owned and managed by the National Trust for Scotland.

== History ==
The earliest parts of Fyvie Castle date from the 13th century – some sources claim it was built in 1211 by William the Lion. Fyvie was the site of an open-air court held by Robert the Bruce, and Charles I lived there as a child for 4 years. Following the Battle of Otterburn in 1388, it ceased to function as a royal stronghold when it was granted to Henry Preston by Robert III. Instead, it fell into the possession of five successive families – Preston, Meldrum, Seton, Gordon and Forbes-Leith – each of whom added a new tower to the castle. The oldest of these, the Preston Tower (located on the far right as one faces the main facade of Fyvie), dates to between 1390 and 1433. The Seton tower forms the entrance and was erected in 1599 by Alexander Seton. He commissioned the wheel staircase several years later. The Gordon Tower followed in 1777, and the Leith in 1890.

Inside, the castle stronghold features a wheel stair, a display of original arms and armour, and a collection of portraits, from artists such as Henry Raeburn, Pompeo Batoni and Thomas Gainsborough.

Manus O'Cahan and Montrose fought a battle against the Covenant Army at Fyvie Castle on 28 October 1644. The battlefield was added to the Inventory of Historic Battlefields in Scotland on 30 November 2011. Anne Halkett stayed at the castle from 1650 to 1652 with the Countess of Dunfermline. During her stay, she treated wounded soldiers and local illnesses, and negotiated with the English major of a company of Commonwealth soldiers, as well as with three colonels, Lilburne, Fitts, and Overton.

The grounds and adjoining Fyvie Lake were landscaped in the 18th century by Col. William Gordon.

The Scottish industrialist Alexander Leith (later Baron Leith of Fyvie) bought the castle in 1885. His descendants sold it to the National Trust for Scotland in 1984.

To the east there is a walled garden where Scottish fruits are currently cultivated. There is evidence for two other walled gardens closer to the castle itself to its west and south. The one to the west appears on an estate plan of 1768.

== Ghostlore ==
Fyvie Castle is associated with a body of local ghostlore and traditional legends, many of which form part of its modern guided tours.

According to tradition, the castle is subject to two curses. One relates to a sealed medieval dungeon, which legend holds would bring death to any intruder and blindness to his wife. Another, known as the “Curse of the Weeping Stones”, is traditionally attributed to the 13th-century seer Thomas the Rhymer, and is said to explain why eldest sons of the families who owned Fyvie allegedly failed to inherit the estate. Of the three stones said to be involved in the curse, one is displayed in the Charter Room.

The castle is also said to be haunted by the “Green Lady”, identified with Lilias Drummond, wife of Alexander Seton. Legend maintains that her name was carved into a stone windowsill on the night of her husband’s remarriage, and that sightings of her ghost have been reported within the castle.

A further tradition reported in local press recounts that a woman’s skeleton discovered within a wall in the late 1920s was later reinterred after sightings of a “Grey Lady” were said to follow its removal.

== In the media ==
Fyvie Castle has featured in a number of British television programmes, such as Living TV's Most Haunted series 6 and STV's Castles of Scotland. The castle also played host of the setting of a children's gameshow on CBBC called Spook Squad in 2004. 2009 saw the publication of the children's fantasy novel, The Time-Tailor and the Fyvie Castle Witch Trials, written by Deborah Leslie. The castle was also featured in the BBC documentary Castle Ghosts of Scotland, narrated by Robert Hardy.

In recent years, the castle grounds have hosted a Fyvie Live music festival in the summer, which was headlined in 2011 by Beverley Knight and in 2012 by Sophie Ellis-Bextor, then following a gap of several years, by The Shires in 2017. Following the revival, it was announced that the event would take place again in 2018, with Ward Thomas as the headline act. In August 2024 it also hosted re-enactors from all over the country to bring a re-enactment of the battle of Fyvie 1644.

Today, the castle is open to tourists between April and October. It is also a wedding venue.

== Gallery ==
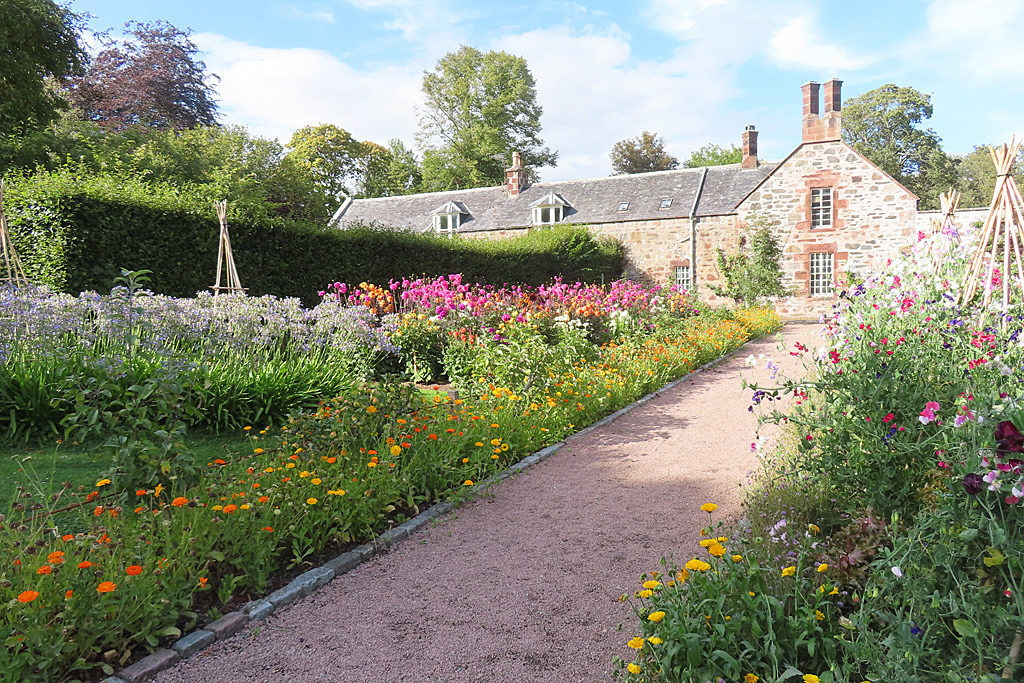
Castle gardens in 2025

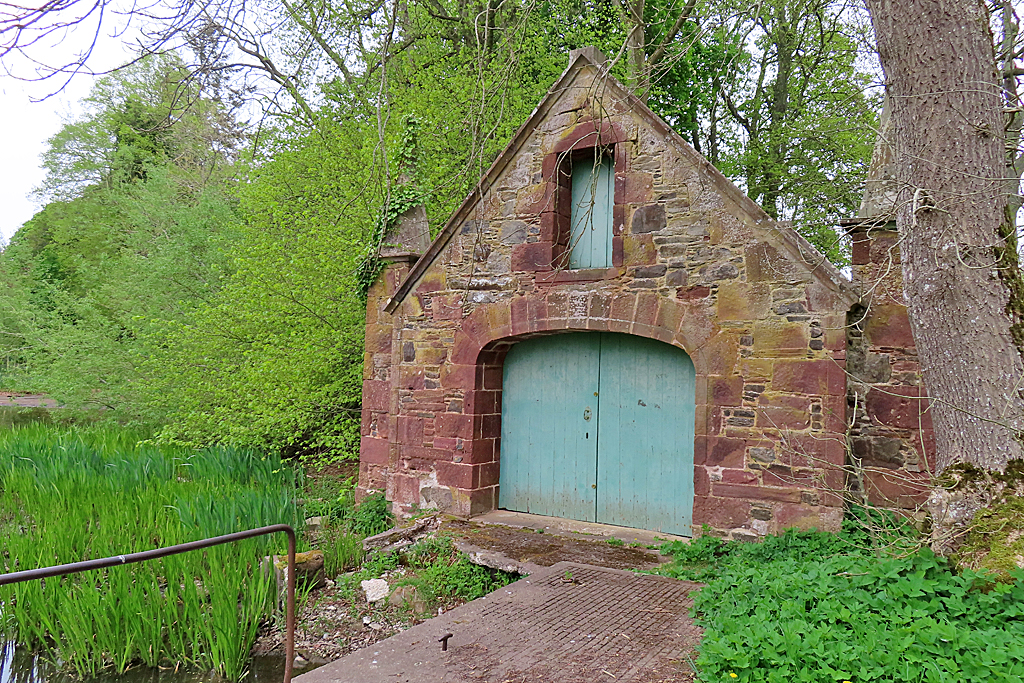
Castle boathouse in 2025

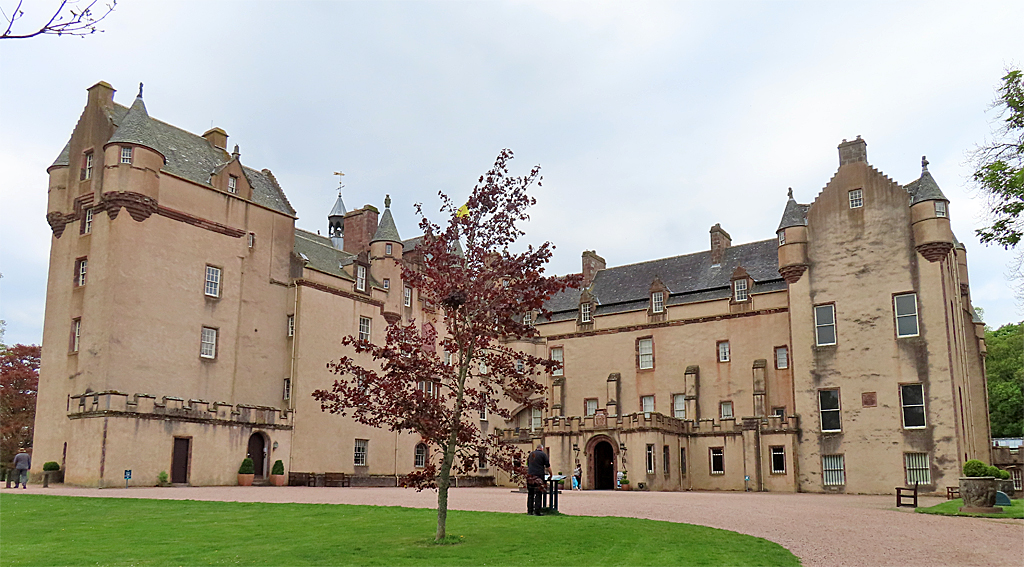
The castle in 2025

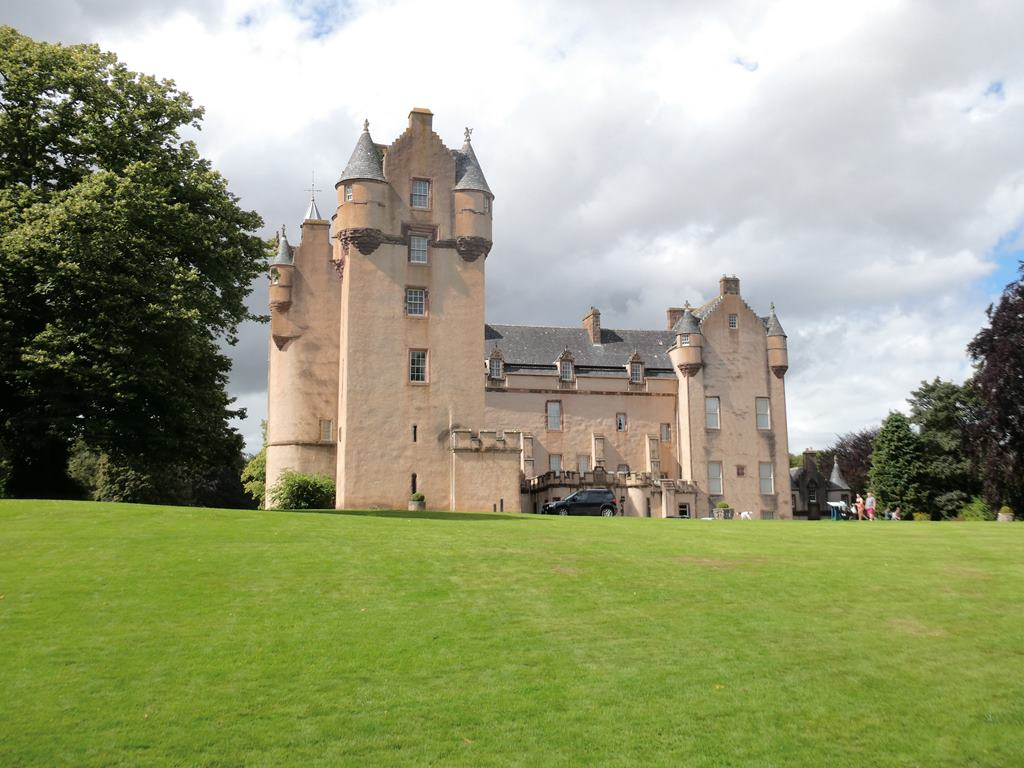
Side view of the castle in 2023

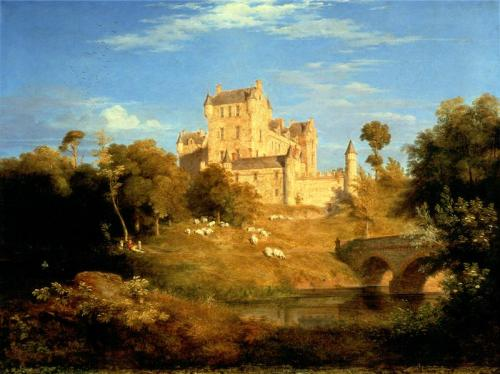
The castle in a painting by James Giles

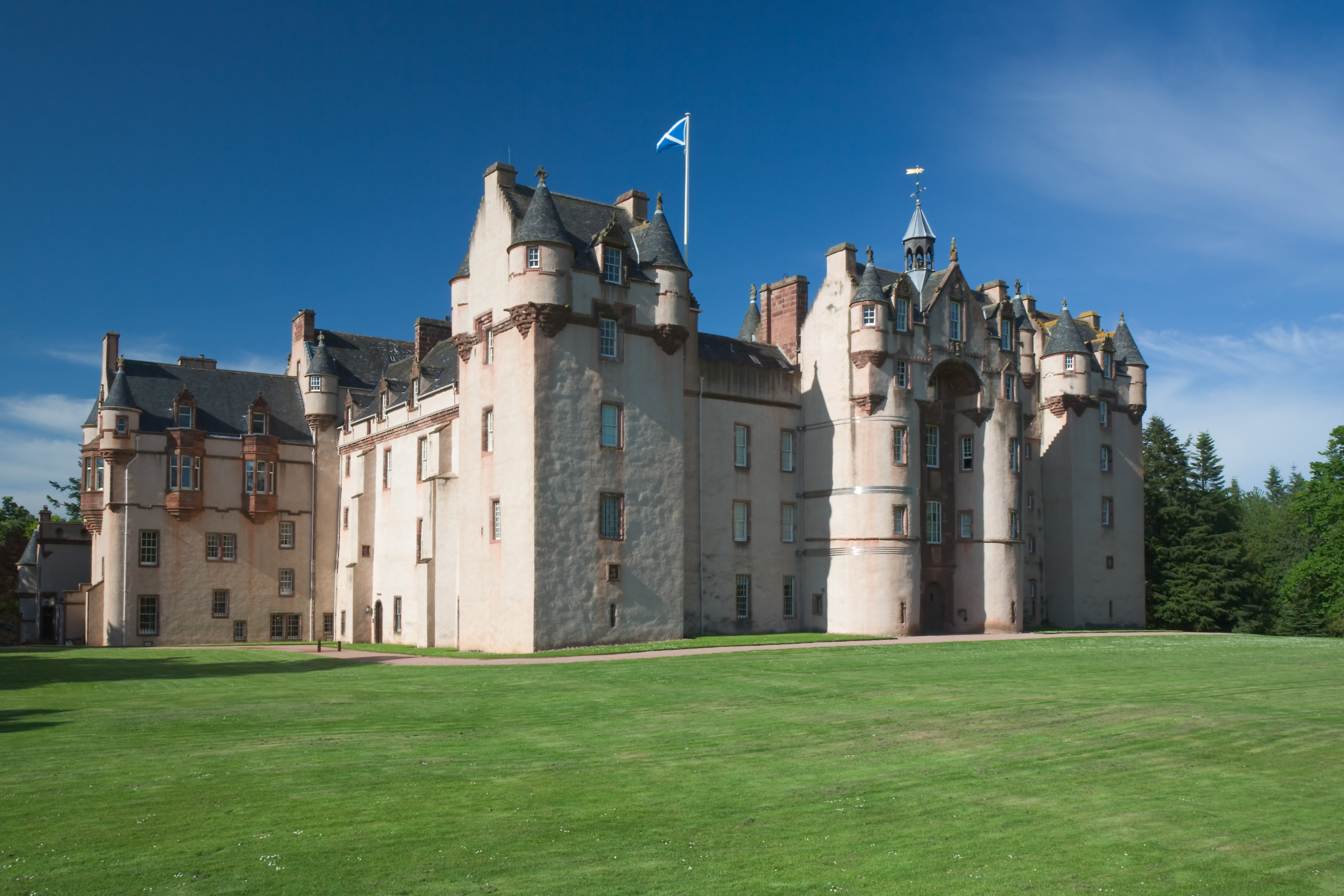
Side view of the castle in 2007
