= Studholme (surname) =

Studholme is a surname, and may refer to:

- Allan Studholme (1946–1919), Canadian trade unionist
- Alexandra Thomson Studholme (1867-1907), British composer
- Edgar Studholme (1866–1949), New Zealand cricketer
- Gilfred Studholme (1740–1792), British military commander during the American Revolution
- Henry Studholme (1899–1987), British politician, son of William
  - Studholme Baronets, hereditary title created for Henry Studholme in 1956
- John Studholme (1829–1903), New Zealand politician
- Marie Studholme (1872–1930), English actress
- Marion Studholme (1927–2016), English soprano
- Paul Studholme (1930–1990), British Army officer
- William Studholme (1864–1941), New Zealand cricketer, son of John
