= William Bentley (disambiguation) =

William Bentley (1759–1819) was an American Unitarian minister, scholar, columnist, and diarist.

William or Bill Bentley may also refer to:

- William Bentley (diplomat), British diplomat
- William E. Bentley (born 1960), American academic
- William Holman Bentley (1855–1905), English missionary
- William Bentley (MP), member of parliament for Tavistock
- William Bentley (novels)
- William Bentley, father of Derek Bentley
- Bill Bentley (footballer) (born 1947), English former professional footballer
- Bill Bentley (American football) (born 1989), American football cornerback
- Bill Bentley (music producer) (born 1950), American music industry executive
