= Roger Baker =

Roger Baker may refer to:

- Roger Baker (handballer) (born 1946), American former handball player
- Roger W. Baker, Assistant Secretary for Information and Technology for the Department of Veterans Affairs
- Roger Baker (MP) (fl. 1406), English politician
