= 1879 Gladstone by-election =

New Zealand by-election

The 1879 Gladstone by-election was a by-election held on 3 January 1879 in the Gladstone electorate during the 6th New Zealand Parliament.

The by-election was caused by the death of the incumbent Frederick Teschemaker on 21 November 1878.

He was replaced by John Studholme.

Studholme was the only candidate, so was declared elected unopposed. Another candidate, Mr Buckingham had withdrawn. Studholme was described as a strong opponent of the Grey Ministry.
