= John Adam Day =

British parliamentary candidate

John Day in the 1930s

John Adam Day (6 July 1901 – 7 June 1966), was a British Liberal Party parliamentary candidate who later became a prominent Conservative in Devon local government.

== Background ==
He was the son of Herbert Allen Day and Isabella Maud Black. He was educated at Bedales School and the London School of Economics. He married, in 1932, Kathleen Emily Hebditch. They had one son and one daughter. He was a Hereditary Freeman of the City of Norwich.

== Career ==
He was appointed a County Magistrate for Devon in 1938. He served in the Royal Air Force from 1940 to 1944. He was a Flight Lieutenant and Deputy Assistant Provost Marshal in charge of Cornwall. He was invalided out in 1944.

== Political career ==
He was Liberal candidate for the Bury St Edmunds Division of Suffolk at the 1924 General Election. This was a safe Conservative seat that the Liberals had not contested since before 1918;

General Election 1924: Bury St Edmunds Electorate
| Party | Candidate | Votes | % | ±% |
|---|---|---|---|---|
| Conservative | Walter Edward Guinness | 16,073 | 63.0 | |
| Liberal | John Adam Day | 9,392 | 37.0 | |
| Majority | | 6,681 | 26.2 | |
| Turnout | | 25,533 | 82.0 | |
| Conservative hold | | Swing | | |

He was Liberal candidate for the Thornbury Division of Gloucestershire at the 1929 General Election. This was a more promising seat that the Liberals had last won in 1923;

| Election | Political result | Candidate | Party | Votes | % | ±% |
|---|---|---|---|---|---|---|
| General election, 1929; Electorate: 49,645; Turnout: 40,973 (82.5%) +3.0 | Conservative hold Majority: 300 (0.8%) −6.7; Swing: 3.4% from Con to Lib | Derrick Wellesley Gunston | Conservative | 13,914 | 34.0 | −8.8 |
| General election, 1929; Electorate: 49,645; Turnout: 40,973 (82.5%) +3.0 | Conservative hold Majority: 300 (0.8%) −6.7; Swing: 3.4% from Con to Lib | John Adam Day | Liberal | 13,614 | 33.2 | −2.1 |
| General election, 1929; Electorate: 49,645; Turnout: 40,973 (82.5%) +3.0 | Conservative hold Majority: 300 (0.8%) −6.7; Swing: 3.4% from Con to Lib | Godfrey Elton | Labour | 13,445 | 32.8 | +10.9 |

He was Liberal candidate for the Tavistock Division of Devon at the 1931 General Election. He was hoping to take the seat from the Conservatives who had narrowly held the seat since taking it from the Liberals in 1924. At an election in which both main contenders claimed to be supporters of the National Government, the Conservative hung on;

General Election 1931: Tavistock Electorate 39,637
| Party | Candidate | Votes | % | ±% |
|---|---|---|---|---|
| Conservative | Colin Mark Patrick | 17,310 | 52.4 | |
| Liberal | John Adam Day | 13,592 | 41.2 | |
| Labour | Richard Davies | 2,124 | 6.4 | |
| Majority | | 3,718 | 11.2 | |
| Turnout | | | 83.3 | |
| Conservative hold | | Swing | | |

He was elected a Member of Devon County Council in 1932. He was again Liberal candidate for the Tavistock Division of Devon at the 1935 General Election, again without success;

General Election 1935: Tavistock Electorate 42,560
| Party | Candidate | Votes | % | ±% |
|---|---|---|---|---|
| Conservative | Colin Mark Patrick | 17,475 | 52.8 | |
| Liberal | John Adam Day | 13,422 | 40.5 | |
| Labour | C H Townsend | 2,236 | 6.7 | |
| Majority | | 4,053 | 12.3 | |
| Turnout | | | 77.9 | |
| Conservative hold | | Swing | | |

He was Treasurer of the Devon & Cornwall Liberal Federation.

== Civic career ==
He was elected an Alderman of Devon County Council in 1947. He served as Vice-Chairman of the Devon County Council Education Committee 1947–55. He served as Chairman of the Devon County Council Children's Committee 1948–55. He served as Sheriff of Devon, 1949–50. He served as Vice-Chairman of Devon County Council from 1955 to 1965. He served as Chairman of the Devon County Council Finance Committee 1956–65. He was Chairman of Torquay Division Conservative Association 1961–63. He served as Chairman of the Devon Community Council in 1962. He served as Chairman of Devon County Council from 1965 to 1966. He was a Member of the Economic Planning Council for the South West from 1965 to 1966.
