= Emma Coles =

Emma Coles may refer to:

- Emma Coles, wife of MP, William Honychurch
- Emma Coles (actress), in Two Friends (1986 film)
