= Studholme (disambiguation) =

Studholme may refer to one of the following

== People ==
- Studholme (surname)
- Studholme Hodgson (1708–1798), a British field marshal during the 18th century.
- Studholme Brownrigg (1882–1943), a British admiral during the 20th century who died at sea in the North Atlantic in 1943

== Places ==
- Studholme, a locality in south Canterbury in New Zealand
- Studholme College, a college of the University of Otago in Dunedin, New Zealand
- Studholme, Cumbria, a hamlet in the English county of Cumbria
- Studholm Parish, New Brunswick, Canada
