= Hugh Luttrell =

Hugh Luttrell may refer to:

- Hugh Luttrell (Liberal politician) (1857–1918), British Liberal Party politician
- Sir Hugh Luttrell (MP, died 1428) (c. 1364–1428), English nobleman and politician during the Hundred Years' War
