= John Studholme =

New Zealand politician (1829–1903)

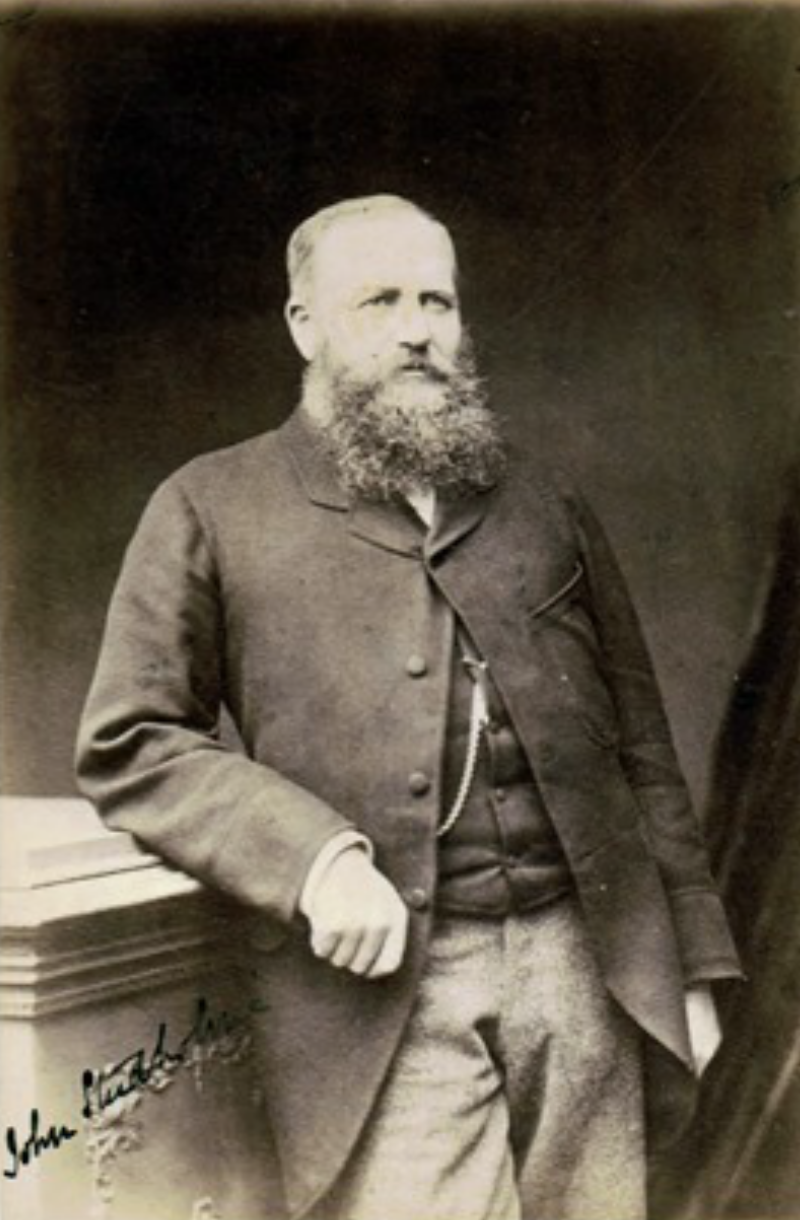
- Constituency: Kaiapoi, Gladstone

Personal details
- Born: 29 May 1829 Carlisle, England
- Died: 7 March 1903 (aged 73) London, England
- Party: Independent
- Spouse: Lucy Ellen Sykes Moorhouse (m. 10 February 1862)
- Relations: Henry Studholme (grandson); Michael Studholme (brother); Paul Studholme (brother); William Sefton Moorhouse (brother-in-law); Barnard Rhodes (wife's brother-in-law)
- Children: John Studholme; William Studholme; Joseph Francis Studholme; Lucy Ellen Studholme; Florence Mary Studholme
- Education: The Queen's College, Oxford

John Studholme (1829–1903) was a 19th-century British pioneer of New Zealand, farmer and politician in the Canterbury region of New Zealand.

== Early life ==
John Studholme was born in 1829 the son of John Studholme, a landowner in Cumberland, now part of Cumbria, England. He was educated at Sedbergh School and The Queen's College, Oxford, where he was a university scholar and earned a blue rowing in the university eight.

At the age of 22, Studholme sailed to New Zealand with his two younger brothers Michael and Paul. Together they bought farmland in Selwyn and Rakaia. The following year, after having set up farms, they travelled to Australia to pursue the Victorian gold rush.

== Establishing settlement and farming ==
In 1852, the Studholme brothers returned to New Zealand. Famously, they took a ship which only went as far as Nelson. Together they walked the 350 miles back to Christchurch. From this time on John and Michael began establishing large stations in both the North and South Islands. Paul Studholme returned to England in 1858. Over the next 20 years they acquired by lease or purchase more than 370,000 hectares (910,000 acres) and farmed extensively.

In 1854, to purchase cattle John and Michael Studholme both walked from Lyttelton to Dunedin (some 250 miles) at a time when there were no roads or bridged rivers. This made them the first Europeans to make such a journey, and along with William Henry Valpy the first Europeans to explore the South Island extensively on foot. Arriving in Dunedin, their cheque was refused at the cattle market since there was no bank yet in Otago to process it and no business transactions between the two provinces existed. John walked back to Lyttelton to get cash, leaving Michael with the cattle. He returned crossing rivers alone with the cash, blankets and provisions at great risk. From Dunedin after having paid for the cattle, the Studholme brothers took the cattle back to Christchurch crossing the Waitaki River. This would have been the first such crossing.

John Studholme explored Southland in 1854 with James Menzies and Edmund Bellairs. The area had recently been bought by Walter Mantell from the local Maori iwi. After a week's hard walking between the Mataura and Ōreti Rivers, Menzies and Bellairs decided to go no further. Studholme continued by himself as far as the Waiau River.

After initially living at Lyttelton, John and his wife Lucy moved to land they owned at Hororata. When Michael travelled to England for five years in 1864, they moved to his established homestead at Waimate. In 1869 upon Michael's return, they bought Merivale Manor, then on the outskirts of Christchurch, from Lucy's brother and sold Hororata to Prime Minister John Hall.

He died in London aged 74 years, having returned to England in 1901.

== Coldstream ==
In 1867, the Studholme Brothers purchased 55,000 acres (22,000 ha) of flat tussock land known as the Coldstream Estate for £35,000 (about £3,800,000 in 2018 value). It was named after the cold stream that rises near the homestead. Ernest Gray had originally taken up a pastoral lease there in 1854 and had been developing it as a sheep and cattle run. The brothers drained 2,000 acres (810 ha) of swamp and started a large cropping programme as well as running 26,000 sheep there. The Rangitata River runs through the land. At the time it was the smallest of the Studholme estates.

John Studholme established Coldstream as his primary homestead, with Michael having previously done so at Waimate. By 1875, 4,000 acres (1,600 ha) were being used for crop farming, running twenty six-horse teams with a permanent staff of 35 men. A settlement was firmly established with a post office, store, church room, library, recreation centre, butcher, and blacksmith.

In 1890, Studholme's son Col. John Studholme (known as Jack) took over farming Coldstream after marrying Alexandra Thomson, daughter of Archbishop of York William Thomson. In 1901, they commissioned renowned New Zealand architect Joseph Maddison to build a new family homestead building.

== Time in Parliament ==
New Zealand Parliament
Years	Term	Electorate	Party
1867–1870	4th	Kaiapoi	Independent
1871–1874	5th	Kaiapoi	Independent
1879	6th	Gladstone	Independent
1879–1881	7th	Gladstone	Independent

As a party-independent politician, he represented the Kaiapoi electorate from 1867 to 1874 when he resigned. He then represented the Gladstone electorate from 1879 to 1881, when he retired. He stood for Ashburton in 1902, and came second.

Studholme was repeatedly asked by Prime Minister William Fox to join the government; he resolutely refused, however.

== Other activities ==
Studholme was a director of the New Zealand Shipping Company and the Union Insurance Company. He was one of the first Canterbury magistrates, and was a first member of the Provincial Council for the Timaru district, which at that time comprised all the provinces south of Ashburton.

Both John and Michael Studholme were avid horseracing enthusiasts and owned several racehorses. They won the New Zealand Cup three times: twice with their horse Knottingley and once with Magenta. They also owned the horses Belle of the Isle, Stormbird, and Nebula. John served on the committee of the Canterbury Jockey Club for many years.

== Family ==
Studholme married Lucy Ellen Sykes Moorhouse, the daughter of William Moorhouse of Knottingley House, Knottingley, Yorkshire, on 10 February 1862. Her brother, William Sefton Moorhouse, was Superintendent of Canterbury Province. Her sister Sarah Ann Moorhouse was married to another early settler William Barnard Rhodes.

Studholme's Arms

John and Lucy had five children:

- Lucy Ellen Studholme (d. 2 April 1945)
- Florence Mary Studholme (d. 14 February 1946)
- Col. John Studholme (10 February 1863 – 26 May 1934), who married Alexandra Thomson (1867–1907), daughter of Archbishop of York William Thomson on 23 June 1897.
- William Studholme (23 April 1864 – 23 February 1941)
- Joseph Francis Studholme (10 March 1866 – 12 July 1930)

Colonel John Studholme inherited the New Zealand estates and the homestead Coldstream. He continued his father's farming and philanthropy. Studholme College at the University of Otago is named after him.

William Studholme was the father of Sir Henry Gray Studholme, 1st Baronet, a prominent British politician during the 1940s and 1950s. Henry's descendants include Capt. Sir Paul Studholme and Harry Studholme, the latter of whom is (as of 2018) the chairman of the U.K. Forestry Commission.

== Legacy ==
The South Canterbury region and town of Studholme is named for the Studholme brothers, most particularly Michael, who was the first settler in the area. Mount Studholme, inland from Waimate, South Canterbury, is the source of the Otaio River. Part of Kaweka Forest Park in Hawke's Bay is named the 'Studholme Saddle' as it is where three of the largest Studholme family farms (Karioi, Ruanui, and Ohauko) met. The Upper and Lower Studholme Passes in the Southern Alps between the headwaters of the Landsborough and Hunter Rivers are also named after the family.

For better or worse, in 1870 Michael Studholme introduced the red-necked wallaby to New Zealand releasing them at his estate Waimate.

== Notes ==
New Zealand Parliament
Preceded by Joseph Beswick	Member of Parliament for Kaiapoi; 1867–1874	Succeeded by Charles Bowen
Preceded by Frederick Teschemaker	Member of Parliament for Gladstone; 1879–1881	Succeeded by James Sutter
