= 1928 Tavistock by-election =

UK parliamentary by-election

The 1928 Tavistock by-election was a parliamentary by-election for the British House of Commons constituency of Tavistock on 11 October 1928.

== Vacancy ==
The by-election was caused by the death of the sitting Unionist MP, Philip Kenyon-Slaney on 9 September 1928. He had been MP since 1924.

== Election history ==
The constituency was a Unionist-Liberal marginal that had been Unionist in 1918 and 1924 and Liberal in 1922 and 1923. The result at the last general election was:

1924 general election Electorate 29,419
Party	Candidate	Votes	%	±%
Unionist	Philip Kenyon-Slaney	12,058	52.8	+6.9
Liberal	Maxwell Ruthven Thornton	10,786	47.2	−6.9
Majority		1,272	5.6	N/A
Turnout		22,844	77.7	0.0
Unionist gain from Liberal		Swing		

== Candidates ==
The Unionist candidate was Wallace Duffield Wright. He served in the British Army, reaching the rank of Brigadier General, being awarded the Victoria Cross. Maxwell Ruthven Thornton, the former Liberal MP who had lost here last time had left the Liberals to join the Unionists in 1925. In 1927, the Liberals selected Reginald Fletcher, the former MP for Basingstoke as their candidate. The Labour Party decided to intervene, and fielded Richard Davies. He was a Plymouth builder, who had been boss of the Municipal Employees Union and had contested Hastings three times without success.

== Main Issues and Campaign ==
With polling day fixed for a date, just 4 weeks after the death or the former MP, the campaign was very short. The Liberals were helped by the fact that Fletcher had been working in the constituency for more than a year. Traditionally, the dominant issue in this rural constituency was farming. None of the three candidates were either local or had a strong knowledge of farming issues. On 26 September, voters went to the polls in Cheltenham, A Unionist seat that had not been won by the Liberals since 1910. The Unionists held the seat with an increased majority, though the intervening Labour candidate managed to poll nearly 19%, costing the Liberal the seat.

== Result ==
Despite a swing to the Liberals, Wright narrowly held onto the seat. The Labour candidate lost his deposit, but took enough votes from the Liberal to let the Unionist win.

Tavistock by-election, 1928 Electorate
Party	Candidate	Votes	%	±%
Unionist	Wallace Duffield Wright	10,745	45.2	−7.6
Liberal	Reginald Fletcher	10,572	44.5	−2.7
Labour	Richard Davies	2,449	10.3	New
Majority		173	0.7	−4.9
Turnout		23,766	77.3	−0.4
Unionist hold		Swing	-2.5	

== Aftermath ==
Wright held the seat at the following general election and retired from Parliament in 1931. Fletcher did not contest the 1929 elections, left the Liberals and joined Labour, being elected in 1935 and serving in Attlee's Labour Government. Davies fought here again in 1929 and again lost his deposit. The result at the following general election;

1929 general election Electorate 38,785
Party	Candidate	Votes	%	±%
Unionist	Wallace Duffield Wright	14,102	44.5	−0.7
Liberal	Hilda Runciman	14,040	44.3	−0.2
Labour	Richard Davies	3,574	11.2	N/A
Majority		152	0.2	−5.4
Turnout		31,716		
Unionist hold		Swing		

== See also ==
- List of United Kingdom by-elections
- United Kingdom by-election records
