= John Amadas =

16th-century English politician

John Amadas of Court Gate, Tavistock, Devon, Eltham, Kent and Launceston
- Born: By 1489
- Died: 1555 (aged 65–66)
- Occupation: Politician
- Known for: Member of the parliament of England for Tavistock, mayor of Launceston

John Amadas (by 1489 – 1554 or 1555), of Court Gate, Tavistock, Devon, Eltham, Kent and Launceston, Cornwall, was an English politician.

He was a member (MP) of the parliament of England for Tavistock in 1515. He was Mayor of Launceston in 1544–45.
