= James Sutter =

New Zealand politician (1818–1903)

New Zealand Parliament
Years	Term	Electorate	Party
1881–1884	8th	Gladstone	Independent
1884–1887	9th	Gladstone	Independent

James Hutchinson Sutter (1818 – 13 April 1903) was a 19th-century member of parliament in Canterbury, New Zealand.

He represented the Gladstone electorate from 1881 to 1887, when he retired. He was Mayor of Timaru from 1875 to 1876 and from 1879 to 1882. He died on 13 April 1903, aged 85.

New Zealand Parliament
Preceded by John Studholme	Member of Parliament for Gladstone; 1881–1887	Succeeded by Arthur Rhodes
