= Phillimore Report =

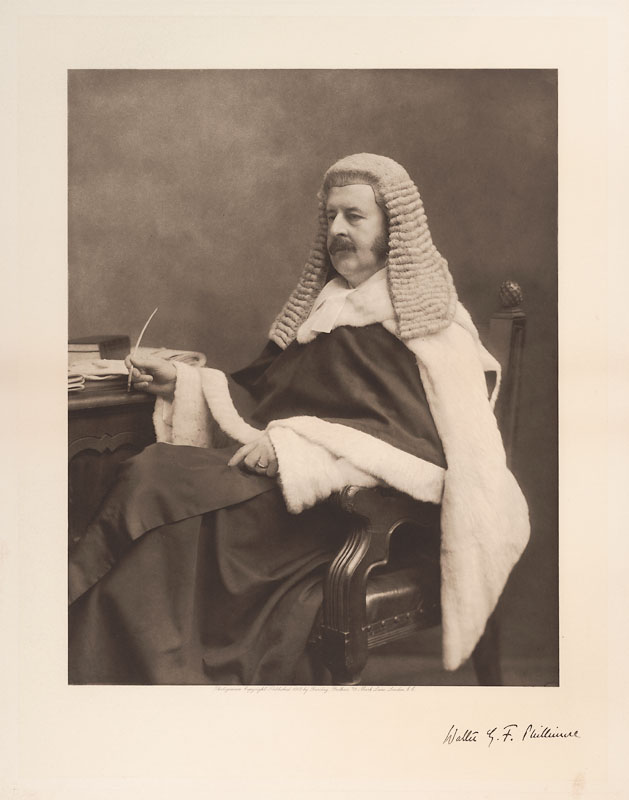
Lord Phillimore

The Phillimore Report was produced by the Phillimore Committee that enquired into proposals for a League of Nations. It was chaired by Lord Phillimore and included Albert Pollard, John Holland Rose, Julian Corbett, Eyre Crowe, William Tyrrell, and Cecil Hurst.

The committee was established in January 1918 after being suggested to Arthur Balfour by Lord Robert Cecil.

It submitted its report on 20 March 1918 and the Cabinet discussed it on 24 December, in which the idea of a League was endorsed.
