= George Byng, 3rd Earl of Strafford =

British politician (1830–1898)

The Right Honourable The Earl of Strafford
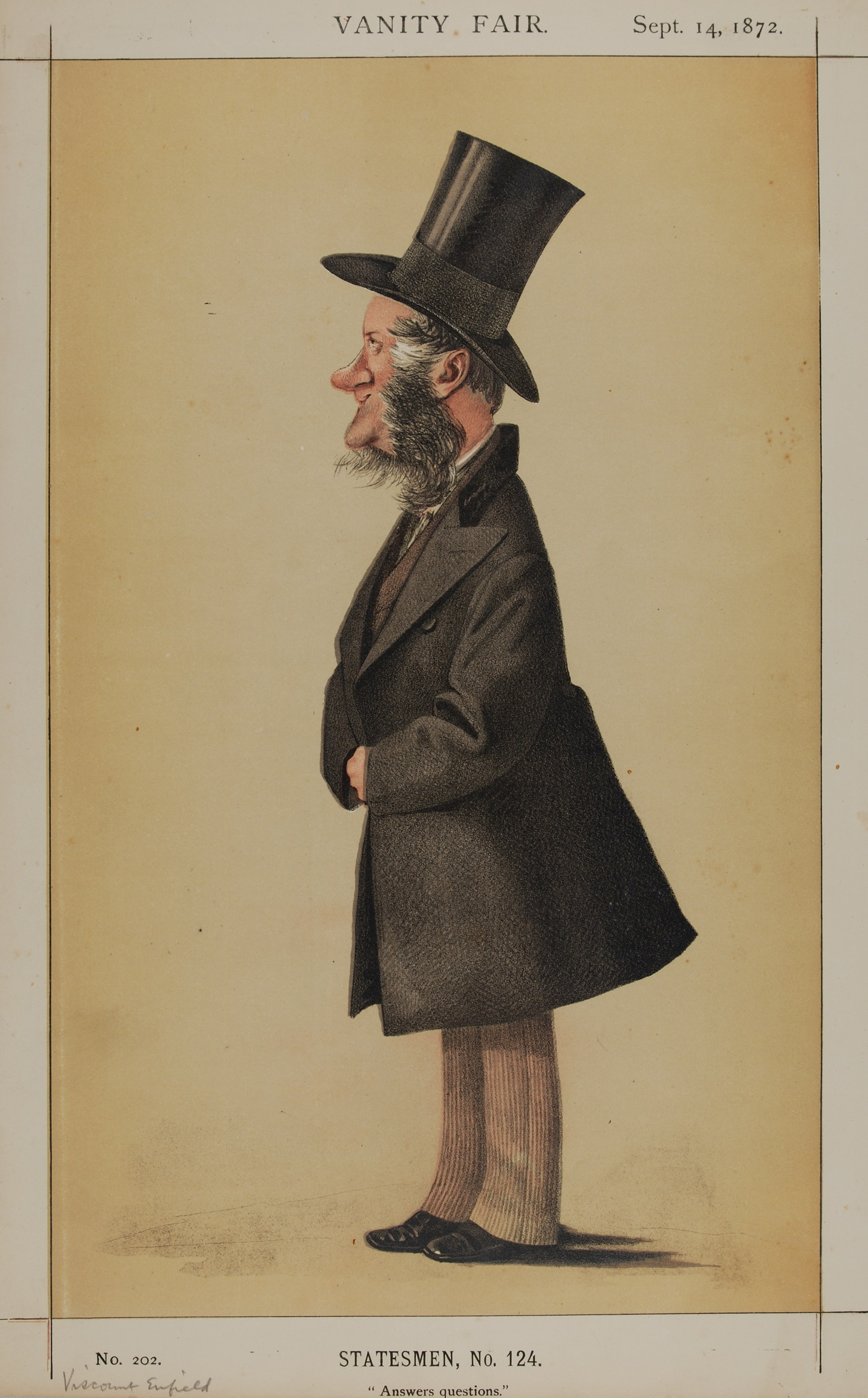
- "Answers questions" Viscount Enfield as caricatured by Adriano Cecioni in Vanity Fair. September 1872

Under-Secretary of State for Foreign Affairs
- In office 9 January 1871 – 17 February 1874
- Monarch: Victoria
- Prime Minister: William Ewart Gladstone
- Preceded by: Arthur Otway
- Succeeded by: Hon. Robert Bourke

Under-Secretary of State for India
- In office 1 September 1880 – 16 January 1883
- Monarch: Victoria
- Prime Minister: William Ewart Gladstone
- Preceded by: The Marquess of Lansdowne
- Succeeded by: John Kynaston Cross

Personal details
- Born: 22 February 1830
- Died: 28 March 1898 (aged 68) Westminster, London, England
- Party: Liberal
- Spouse(s): Lady Alice Egerton (d. 1928)
- Education: Christ Church, Oxford

George Henry Charles Byng, 3rd Earl of Strafford (22 February 1830 – 28 March 1898), styled Viscount Enfield between 1860 and 1886, was a British Liberal politician.

== Background and education ==
Byng was the eldest son of George Byng, 2nd Earl of Strafford and his wife, Lady Agnes, daughter of Henry Paget, 1st Marquess of Anglesey. He was educated at Eton and graduated from Christ Church, Oxford in 1852.

== Political career ==
In 1852 Byng entered Parliament as Member of Parliament for Tavistock, a seat he held until 1857, when he became MP for Middlesex. He served under Lord Russell as Parliamentary Secretary to the Poor Law Board between 1865 and 1866 and under William Ewart Gladstone as Under-Secretary of State for Foreign Affairs between 1871 and 1874.

In 1874, Lord Enfield left the House of Commons when he was defeated at the general election, but was then called up to the House of Lords in his father's barony of Strafford. He again held office under Gladstone as a Lord-in-waiting in 1880 and as Under-Secretary of State for India between 1880 and 1883.

Lord Strafford was also First Civil Service Commissioner from 1880 to 1888 and Lord Lieutenant of Middlesex from 1884 to 1888. When the first Middlesex County Council was formed in 1889, he was chosen as a County Alderman, serving until 1895. Throughout his political career, he served with the part-time Royal West Middlesex Militia, becoming Lieutenant-Colonel on 30 October 1853 when his father was the Colonel. On 21 September 1871 he took over from his father as Honorary Colonel of the regiment, being succeeded in his turn by his younger brother Henry on 15 June 1878.

In 1886, he succeeded his father in the earldom of Strafford.

== Interests ==
He was the third President of the Folklore Society, serving in that role between 1885 and 1888. It has been argued that his links with the Society should be seen more as "aristocratic patronage" rather than active research interest in the topic.

== Family ==
Lord Strafford married Lady Alice Harriet Frederica, eldest daughter of Francis Egerton, 1st Earl of Ellesmere, on 25 July 1854. They had no children. He died at the family home in St. James's Square in March 1898, aged 68, and was succeeded in the earldom by his younger brother, Henry. The Countess of Strafford died in December 1928.

Parliament of the United Kingdom
Preceded by Hon. Edward Russell; Samuel Carter	Member of Parliament for Tavistock; 1852 – 1857; With: Samuel Carter 1852–1853; Robert Phillimore 1853–1857; Sir John Trelawney 1857	Succeeded by Sir John Trelawney; Lord Arthur Russell
Preceded by Lord Robert Grosvenor; Robert Hanbury	Member of Parliament for Middlesex; 1857 – 1874; With: Robert Hanbury 1857–1867; Henry Labouchere 1867–1868; Lord George Hamilton 1868–1874	Succeeded by Lord George Hamilton; Octavius Coope
Political offices
Preceded by Charles Gilpin	Parliamentary Secretary to the Poor Law Board; 1865–1866	Succeeded by Ralph Anstruther Earle
Preceded by Arthur Otway	Under-Secretary of State for Foreign Affairs; 1871–1874	Succeeded by Hon. Robert Bourke
Preceded by The Marquess of Lansdowne	Under-Secretary of State for India; 1880–1883	Succeeded by John Kynaston Cross
Government offices
Preceded by The Lord Hampton	First Civil Service Commissioner; 1880–1888	Succeeded by Sir George Webbe Dasent
Honorary titles
Preceded by The Duke of Wellington	Lord Lieutenant of Middlesex; 1884–1898	Succeeded by The Duke of Bedford
New post	President of Middlesex County Cricket Club; 1866 – 1876 and 1877 – 1898	Succeeded by Edward Walker
Peerage of the United Kingdom
Preceded by George Byng	Earl of Strafford; 1886–1898	Succeeded by Henry Byng
Preceded by George Byng	Baron Strafford (writ in acceleration); 1874–1898	Succeeded by Henry Byng
