= John Wendout =

English politician

John Wyndout or Wendout (fl. 1378–1386), of Tavistock, Devon, was an English politician.

== Family ==
His wife was named Alice; they are thought to have had one daughter.

== Career ==
He was a member (MP) of the parliament of England for Tavistock in 1378 and 1386.
