= William Reece =

New Zealand mayor (1856–1930)

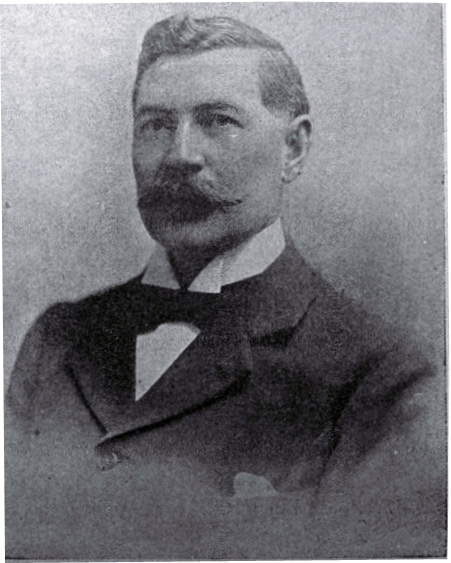

23rd Mayor of Christchurch
- In office 20 December 1899 – March 1901
- Preceded by: Charles Louisson
- Succeeded by: Arthur Rhodes

Personal details
- Born: 23 October 1856 Christchurch, New Zealand
- Died: 17 July 1930 (aged 73) Riccarton, Christchurch, New Zealand

William Reece (23 October 1856 – 17 July 1930) was a New Zealand businessman and local-body politician. He served as mayor of Christchurch for the years 1900 and 1901.

== Early life ==
Reece's father, Edward Reece, was the son of a Shropshire farmer. He arrived in Lyttelton in August 1855 on the Caroline Agnes. On 1 January 1856, Edward Reece married Isabella Asher at Lyttelton. William Reece was born on 23 October 1856 in Christchurch. William would have four younger brothers and one sister.

His father became a well-known iron monger with a shop in Colombo Street. From 1862, his father owned Bottle Lake and the Waitikiri swamplands for farming.

William Reece received his schooling at the Christchurch Academy where he was head boy in Latin and French. He was then sent to England to get an education in business management, leaving on the Waitangi in January 1875.

== Professional life ==
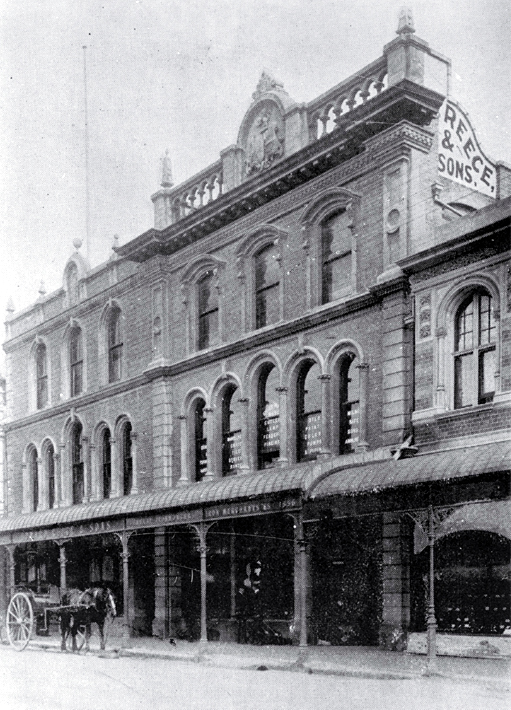
Premises of Reece & Sons in Colombo Street, Christchurch, in the 1890s

Upon William Reece's return to Christchurch in 1879, his father handed his business over to him. When his father died in 1887, he then shared the responsibility of managing it with his brother Charles Stewart Reece. His brother retired in 1892 and William managed the company by himself from then on.

For a time, the artist Charles Frederick Goldie lived at Reece's Bottle Lake Farm. Goldie donated a painting of his sister Violet to Reece. The painting stayed within the family until 1966 and is now held by Te Papa, the national museum.

== Political career ==
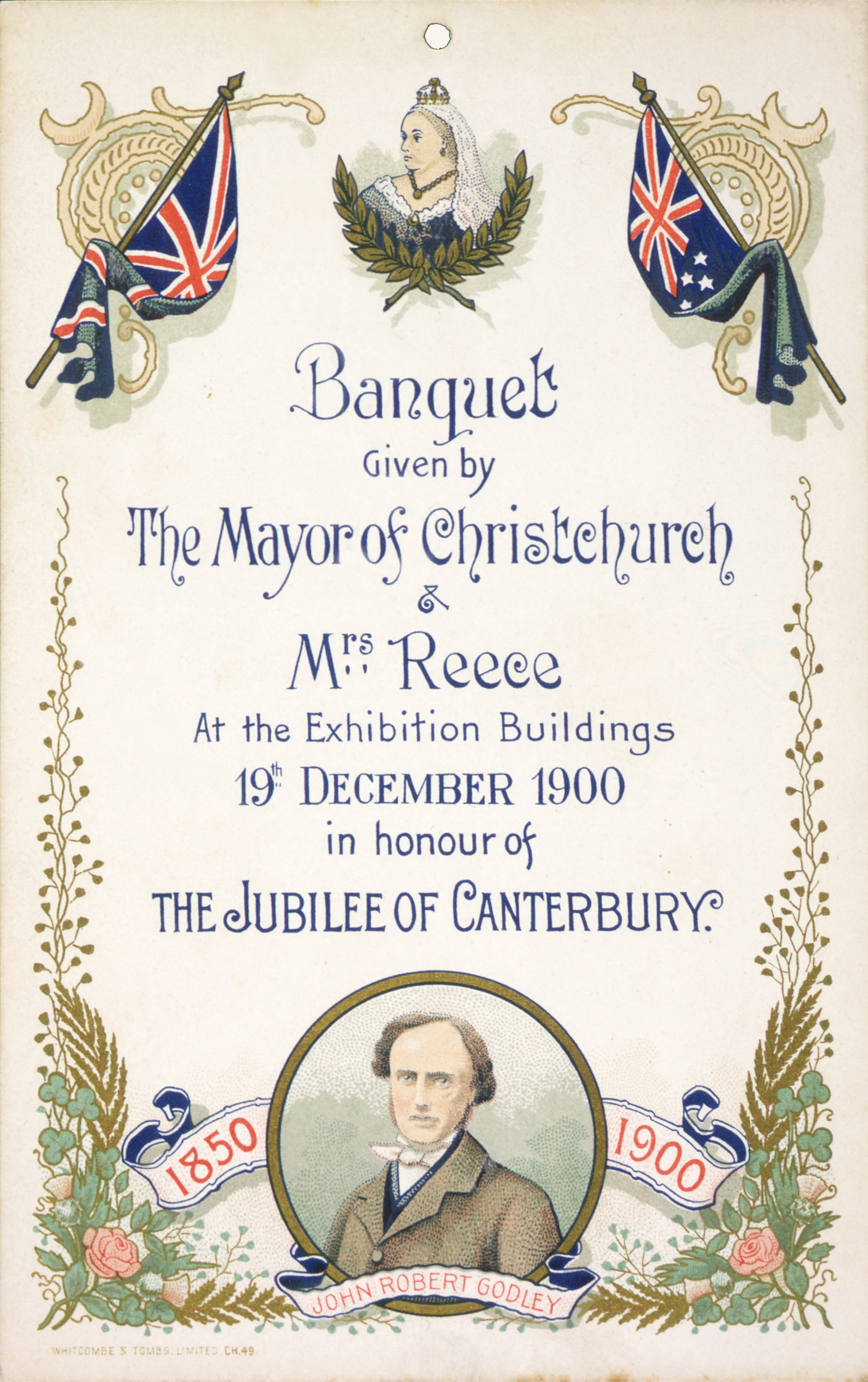
Banquet invitation for the centennial celebrations hosted by Mayor William Reece

Local politics ran in the family for William Reece. In 1862, his father was elected onto the inaugural Christchurch Municipal Council.

Louisson was succeeded by Reece, who was elected unopposed on 20 November 1899 and installed as mayor on 20 December 1899.

Mayoral elections were usually held in the second half of December, but in 1900, that would have clashed with the Canterbury Jubilee celebrations (the First Four Ships first arrived in December 1850). Mayoral elections were thus postponed until April 1901. Reece declared in December 1900 that he could not serve another term due to other commitments, and Arthur Rhodes received a requisition asking him to be nominated as mayoral candidate.

Reece was the inaugural chairman of the Christchurch Tramway Board from 1903 to 1906.

== Family and death ==
On 28 April 1880, Reece married Eva Raine (born 1861) at Christ Church Cathedral in Nelson. They were to have five sons and two daughters.

Eva Reece died in 1926. After her death, Reece lived with one of their daughters (Mrs Molyneaux). He died at their home in Riccarton on 17 July 1930. He was buried at Linwood Cemetery. He was survived by five sons and one daughter.

Political offices
Preceded by Charles Louisson	Mayor of Christchurch; 1900–1901	Succeeded by Arthur Rhodes
