= John Gale (MP) =

16th-century English politician

John Gale (1516/17 – 1554), of Crediton, Devon, was an English politician who served as MP for Totnes in 1545 and for Tavistock in 1547. Gale died in 1554 leaving his entire estate to his wife, Elizabeth.
