= Philip Kenyon-Slaney =

Major Philip Percy Kenyon-Slaney MC (12 February 1896 – 9 September 1928) was a British Conservative Party politician.

Kenyon-Slaney was son of Percy Kenyon-Slaney (1861–1911) and his wife, Geraldine Ellen Georgina, daughter of the Reverend George William Whitmore, who had made their home at Langworthy, Devon. His uncle Colonel William Kenyon-Slaney had also been a Member of Parliament.

He was educated at Bradfield School.

Throughout the First World War he served with Royal North Devon Yeomanry, Royal Field Artillery, seeing action on the Western Front. He was mentioned in despatches and awarded the Military Cross in the 1916 Birthday Honours. He was gassed several times, subsequently affecting his health. After the war he was on the Territorial Army Reserve of Officers with the rank of Major.

He was elected at the 1924 general election as Member of Parliament (MP) for the Tavistock division of Devon, and held the seat until his death, in a Torquay nursing home, in 1928, aged 32.

His health had caused him to announce he would not stand at the next general election. His last home was at Beechwood House, Plympton, Devon.

Parliament of the United Kingdom
Preceded by Maxwell Thornton	Member of Parliament for Tavistock; 1924 – 1928	Succeeded by Wallace Duffield Wright
