= Godfrey Walter Phillimore, 2nd Baron Phillimore =

English peer, soldier and author

Godfrey Walter Phillimore, 2nd Baron Phillimore MC, DL (of Shiplake in the County of Oxford) (Henley-on-Thames, 29 December 1879 – Cape Town, 28 November 1947) was an English peer, soldier and author.

He was the eldest surviving son of Walter Phillimore, 1st Baron Phillimore and his wife Agnes, daughter of Charles Manners Lushington, M.P. He was educated at Christ Church, Oxford and was admitted to the Middle Temple on 1 November 1900. He withdrew without being Called to the Bar on 13 January 1928. During World War I he served with the Highland Light Infantry. He wrote a book about his time in captivity entitled "Recollections of a prisoner of war". He married twice, but his eldest son, Anthony Francis, predeceased him, having been killed near Arras, France, 23 May 1940, in World War II.

During the Spanish Civil War, Phillimore was a strong supporter of General Franco and the fascists, serving as the chairman of the Friends of National Spain committee.

Coat of arms of Godfrey Walter Phillimore, 2nd Baron Phillimore
Crest In front of a tower Argent thereon a falcon volant Proper holding in the beak a lure Gold three cinqeufoils fesswise Or. Escutcheon Sable three bars indented Erminois in chief an anchor between two cinqeufoils Or. Supporters On either side an owl Proper each charged with an anchor Or. Motto Fortem Posce Animum (Pray for a Brave Soul)

== Notes ==
Peerage of the United Kingdom
Preceded by Walter Phillimore	Baron Phillimore; 1929–1947	Succeeded by Robert Phillimore
