= Walter Phillimore, 1st Baron Phillimore =

British lawyer and judge

The Right Honourable The Lord Phillimore GBE PC
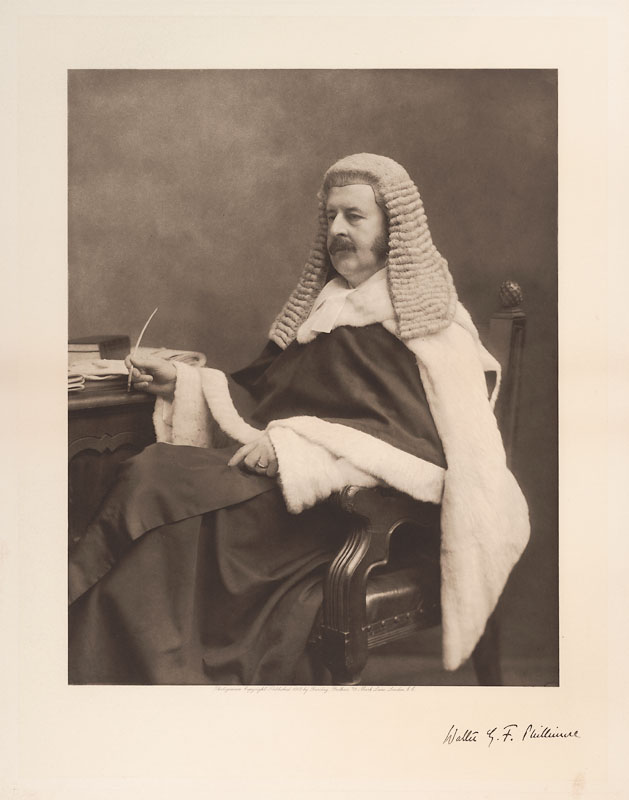

Lord Justice of Appeal
- In office 21 October 1913 – 12 October 1916

Justice of the High Court
- In office 1 December 1897 – 21 October 1913

Personal details
- Education: Christ Church, Oxford

Walter George Frank Phillimore, 1st Baron Phillimore (21 November 1845 – 13 March 1929), known as Sir Walter Phillimore, 2nd Baronet, from 1885 to 1918, was a British lawyer and judge.

== Biography ==
Phillimore was the son of Sir Robert Phillimore, 1st Baronet, and of Charlotte Phillimore (née Denison). His mother was the sister of Evelyn Denison, 1st Viscount Ossington and of Edward Denison.

He was educated at Westminster School and Christ Church, Oxford, where he held a studentship. At Oxford he took Firsts in Classics, Law, and Modern History, was Secretary and Treasurer of the Oxford Union, and was awarded the Vinerian Scholarship. He was also elected a fellow of All Souls College, Oxford. He was called to the bar by the Middle Temple in 1868, and joined the Western Circuit.

Phillimore was an eminent ecclesiastical lawyer, and mostly practiced in front of ecclesiastical and admiralty courts, seldom appearing in front of the common law courts. He was involved in many famous ecclesiastical cases, often related to ritualistic controversies. He also gave the opinion in the 1884 case of the Home Office Baby.

In 1872 he was appointed Chancellor of the Diocese of Lincoln. In 1883 he was given a patent of precedence (the last ever granted) giving him the same privileges as a Queen's Counsel, though he was never appointed a QC. In 1885, upon his father's death, he succeeded to the Phillimore baronetcy.

He was a Judge of the High Court of Justice from 1897 to 1913 and a Lord Justice of Appeal from 1913 to 1916. In 1902 he represented the United Kingdom at a meeting of an International Maritime Committee in Hamburg, which debated a draft treaty relating to a uniform law concerning collisions and maritime salvage.

In 1913, he was admitted to the Privy Council and on 2 July 1918 he was raised to the peerage as Baron Phillimore, of Shiplake in the County of Oxford.

In 1918 he chaired the Phillimore Committee, appointed by the British government to report on proposals for a League of Nations. The committee was established in January 1918 after being suggested to Arthur Balfour by Lord Robert Cecil.

Lord Phillimore died in London in March 1929, aged 83, and was succeeded in his titles by his son Godfrey.

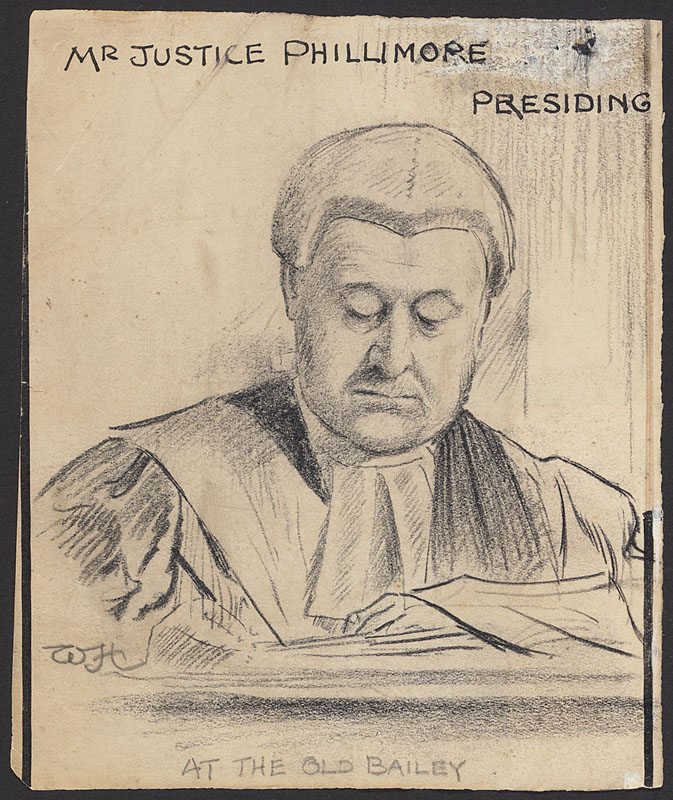
Courtroom sketch of Lord Phillimore presiding at the Old Bailey

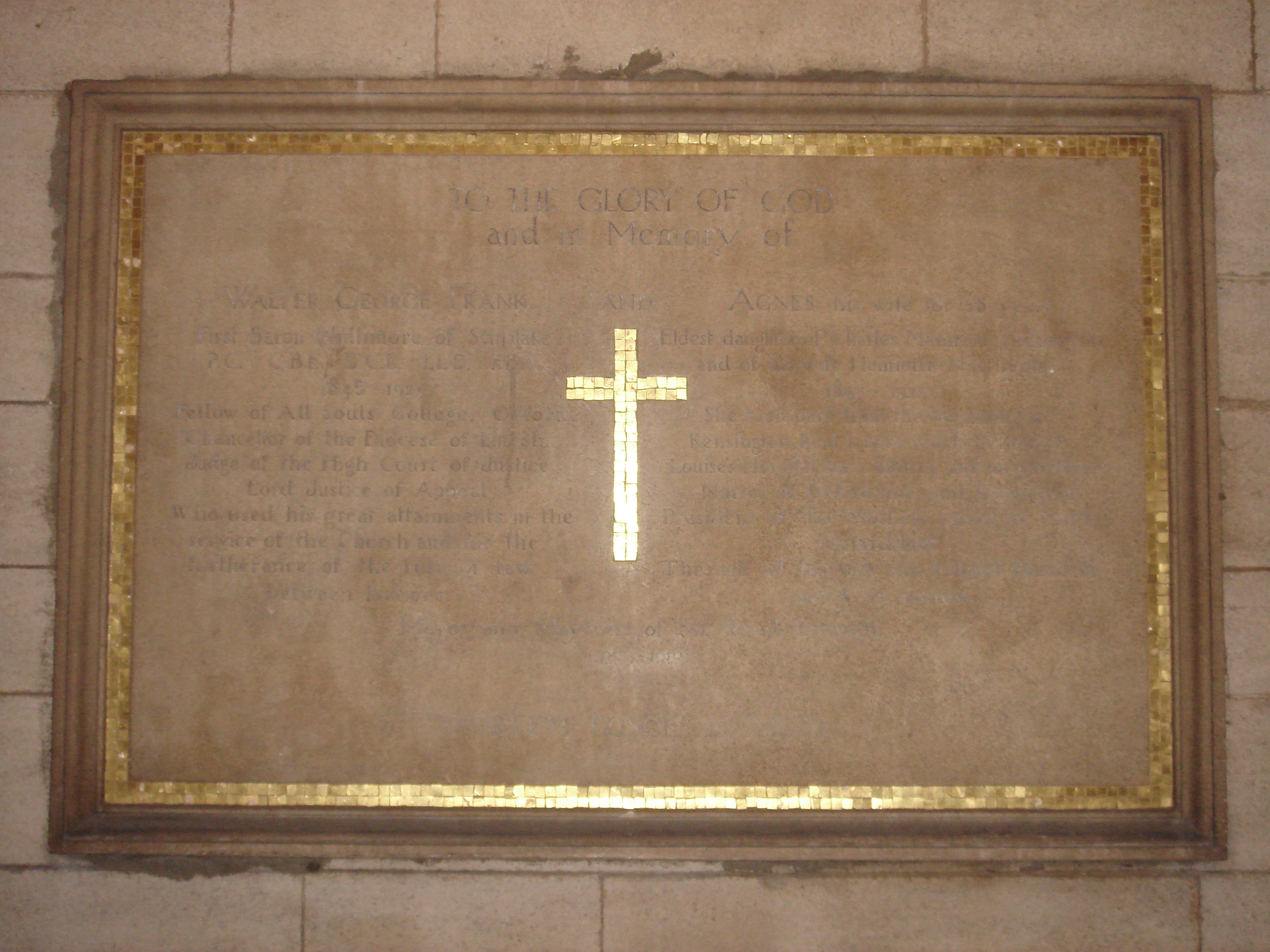
Memorial to Phillimore and his wife Agnes in St Mary Abbots, Kensington

== Arms ==
Coat of arms of Walter Phillimore, 1st Baron Phillimore
Crest In front of a tower Argent thereon a falcon volant Proper holding in the beak a lure Gold three cinqeufoils fesswise Or. Escutcheon Sable three bars indented Erminois in chief an anchor between two cinqeufoils Or. Supporters On either side an owl Proper each charged with an anchor Or. Motto Fortem Posce Animum (Pray for a Brave Soul)

== Bibliography ==
- Kidd, Charles, Williamson, David (editors). Debrett's Peerage and Baronetage (1990 edition). New York: St Martin's Press, 1990.
- Peerage information.
- W. A. B. (1928) "The Right Hon. Baron Phillimore of Shiplake, Baronet, PC, DCL, LLD, JP", Transactions of the Grotius Society, Vol. 14, Problems of Peace and War, Papers Read before the Society in the Year 1928, ppv-ix.

Peerage of the United Kingdom
New creation	Baron Phillimore; 1918–1929	Succeeded by Godfrey Walter Phillimore
Baronetage of the United Kingdom
Preceded by Robert Joseph Phillimore	Baronet (of the Coppice); 1885–1929	Succeeded by Godfrey Walter Phillimore
