= Edward Russell, 23rd Baron de Clifford =

British Whig politician

The Right Honorable The Lord de Clifford

Member of Parliament for Tavistock
- In office 2 August 1847 – 8 July 1852 Serving with Samuel Carter (Apr. 1852–Jul. 1852); John Salusbury-Trelawny (1847–Apr. 1852)
- Preceded by: Edward Russell; John Salusbury-Trelawny
- Succeeded by: Samuel Carter; George Byng

Personal details
- Born: Edward Southwell Russell; 30 April 1824
- Died: 6 August 1877 (aged 53) Kirkby Mallory, Leicestershire
- Party: Whig
- Spouse: Harriet Agnes Elliot (m. 1853)
- Children: 4, including Edward Russell
- Parent(s): John Russell; Sophia Coussmaker, Baroness de Clifford
- Education: Trinity College, Cambridge

Edward Southwell Russell, 23rd Baron de Clifford (30 April 1824 – 6 August 1877) was a British Whig politician.

Russell was the son of Commander John Russell, third son of Lord William Russell, and Sophia Coussmaker, Baroness de Clifford. He was baptised on 27 May 1824 at Ratley, Warwickshire, England and, then educated at Trinity College, Cambridge. On his father's side, he was related to the Dukes of Bedford, and was a second cousin of the Prime Minister during his term in parliament, John Russell, 1st Earl Russell.

In 1853, he married Harriet Agnes Elliot, daughter of Admiral Sir Charles Elliot and Clara Genevieve née Windsor. They had at least four children: Maud Clara Russell (1853–1947); Edward Southwell Russell (1855–1894); Charles Somerset Russell (1857–1886); and Katherine Russell (1861–1950).

Russell was elected a Whig Member of Parliament for Tavistock in 1847 and held the seat until 1852 when he did not seek re-election.

He became the 23rd Baron de Clifford upon the death of his mother in 1874. After his death three years later, the title passed to his son and namesake, Edward Southwell Russell. At this point, his will was proven by probate at under £90,000.

Parliament of the United Kingdom
Preceded by Edward Russell; John Salusbury-Trelawny	Member of Parliament for Tavistock; 1847–1852; With: Samuel Carter (Apr. 1852–Jul. 1852); John Salusbury-Trelawny (1847–Apr. 1852)	Succeeded by Samuel Carter; George Byng
Peerage of the United Kingdom
Preceded by Sophia Coussmaker	Baron de Clifford; 1874–1877	Succeeded by Edward Russell
