= John Spear =

British politician

Sir John Ward Spear (1848 – 27 April 1921) was a British Liberal Unionist and later Conservative politician.

He was elected at the 1900 general election as Member of Parliament (MP) for the Tavistock division of Devon, with a majority of only 15 votes. He was defeated in 1906 by his Liberal Party predecessor Hugh Luttrell, but cut Luttrell's majority in January 1910 and defeated him at the December 1910 general election. He did not contest the 1918 general election, and retired from Parliament.

Parliament of the United Kingdom
Preceded by Hugh Luttrell	Member of Parliament for Tavistock; 1900–1906	Succeeded by Hugh Luttrell
Preceded by Hugh Luttrell	Member of Parliament for Tavistock; December 1910 – 1918	Succeeded by Charles Williams
