= Gladstone (New Zealand electorate) =

Gladstone was a parliamentary electorate in the Canterbury region of New Zealand, from 1866 to 1890.

== Geographic coverage ==
Gladstone was located in the South Canterbury region. In 1866 and 1871, the nomination meetings were held in Waimate.

== History ==
Gladstone was created in 1866 for the 4th Parliament. Francis Jollie won the 1866 election unopposed and became the first representative. He died in November 1870. As this was one month before the dissolution of Parliament, there was no by-election. George Parker was elected in the 1871 election. He retired in 1875. He was succeeded by Frederick Teschemaker, who won the 1876 election. Teschemaker died on 21 November 1878 before the end of the term.

John Studholme won the resulting January 1879 by-election unopposed, and was confirmed at the 1879 general election. He held the electorate until the end of the term in 1881. He was succeeded by James Sutter, who won the 1881 and 1884 elections. He served until 1887.

The 1887 election was contested by Arthur Rhodes, Jeremiah Twomey and F Franks. Whilst Twomey clearly won the show of hands at the nomination meeting, Rhodes defeated him with 739 to 663 votes, with Franks receiving 16 votes. Rhodes served until the end of the term in 1890, when the electorate was abolished. Rhodes successfully contested the Geraldine electorate in 1890.

== Members of Parliament ==
Gladstone was represented by six Members of Parliament:

Key

Independent

Election	Winner
1866 election	Francis Jollie
1871 election	George Parker
1876 election	Frederick Teschemaker
1879 by-election	John Studholme
1879 election	John Studholme
1881 election	James Sutter
1884 election	James Sutter
1887 election	Arthur Rhodes
