= Mark Patrick (MP) =

British politician

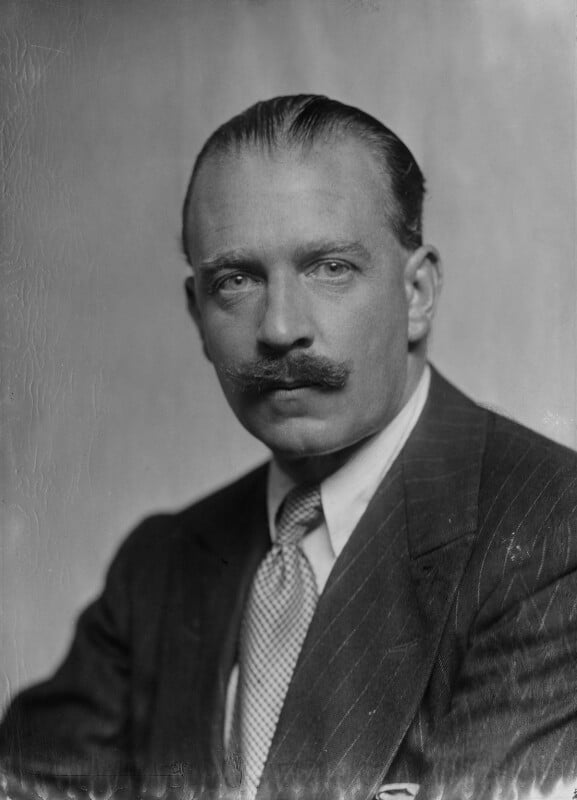
Patrick c. 1940–42

Colin Mark Patrick (21 October 1893 – 7 January 1942) was a British Conservative Party politician.

He was the son of Mr CG Patrick, of Longparish, Hampshire, and served in the First Great War with the 16th Lancers, he was wounded and mentioned in dispatches.

Entering the diplomatic service after the war, he served in several countries and acted as Charge d’Affaires in Holland and Switzerland. He resigned just before entering Parliament, where he had been Parliamentary Private Secretary to the Under Secretary of State for Foreign Affairs and to the Secretary of State for India. He resigned from the former post because he voted against the Government on the Tithe Bill. He was twice married and had one son and two daughters.

In 1933 he published Hammer and Sickle dealing with the Soviet regime. In 1937 he was elected a director of Carreras Ltd. He was a Freemason, a member of Bedford Lodge, No. 282. He first married Mary, daughter of Col. H Mulliner. His second wife, Evelyn, was a daughter of the Earl of Lovelace.

In 1939 he was called up with the Territorials and served in World War 2 with the Lancers. In October 1941 it was announced that he was leaving the army to take up other war work in London.

He was elected at the 1931 general election as Member of Parliament (MP) for the Tavistock division of Devon, and held the seat until his death from a heart attack in 1942, aged 48 suffered at his flat in Arlington House.

Parliament of the United Kingdom
Preceded by Wallace Duffield Wright	Member of Parliament for Tavistock; 1931 – 1942	Succeeded by Henry Studholme
