= John Tryll =

English politician

John Tryll (fl. 1386) was an English MP.

He was a member (MP) of the parliament of England for Tavistock in 1386. Nothing more is known of him.
