= John Kene =

English politician

John Kene (fl. 1402), of Devon, was an English politician.

He was a Member (MP) of the Parliament of England for Tavistock in 1402.

Parliament of England
Preceded by ? ?	Member of Parliament for Tavistock; 1402; With: Ranulph Hunt	Succeeded by ? ?
