= Henry Studholme =

British politician

The Right Honourable Sir Henry Studholme Bt CVO DL

Vice-Chamberlain of the Household
- In office 1951–1956
- Monarchs: George VI; Elizabeth II
- Prime Minister: Winston Churchill; Anthony Eden
- Preceded by: Ernest Popplewell
- Succeeded by: Sir Richard Thompson Bart.

Member of Parliament for Tavistock
- In office 2 April 1942 – 10 March 1966
- Preceded by: Colin Patrick
- Succeeded by: Michael Heseltine

Personal details
- Born: Henry Gray Studholme; 13 June 1899 Exeter, Devon, England
- Died: 9 October 1987 (aged 88) Plymouth, Devon, England
- Party: Conservative
- Spouse: Judith Joan Mary Whitbread (m. 1926)
- Children: 3, including Paul
- Education: Magdalen College, Oxford

Sir Henry Gray Studholme, 1st Baronet CVO DL (13 June 1899 – 9 October 1987) was a British Conservative Party politician who was the MP for Tavistock from 1942 to 1966.

== Early life ==
Studholme was the son of landowner William Paul Studholme and a grandson of New Zealand pioneer and politician John Studholme. He was educated at Eton College and Magdalen College, Oxford and served as an officer in the Scots Guards.

The Uffizi Society Oxford, ca. 1920. First row standing: Henry Studholme, later Sir Henry Studholme, baronet (5th from left). Seated: Lord Balniel, later 28th Earl of Crawford (2nd from left); Ralph Dutton, later 8th Baron Sherborne (3rd from left); Anthony Eden, later Earl of Avon (4th from left); Lord David Cecil (5th from left).

== Parliament ==
Studholme was Member of Parliament (MP) for Tavistock from a 1942 by-election until his retirement in 1966, when he was succeeded by Michael Heseltine. He served under Winston Churchill and then Anthony Eden as Vice-Chamberlain of the Household (i.e. a whip) from 1951 to 1956. In 1956, he was created a Baronet of Perridge in the County of Devon. He was Joint Honorary Treasury of the Conservative Party from 1956 to 1962.

Michael Crick wrote that Studholme was a diligent constituency MP but an "appalling speaker", and he thus benefitted from serving as a whip, as they seldom speak during debates.

== Family ==
Studholme married Judith Joan Mary Whitbread, daughter of Henry William Whitbread and granddaughter of Samuel Whitbread, in 1929. They had two sons and a daughter.

Studholme later served as a deputy lieutenant of Devon in 1969. He died in Plymouth on 9 October 1987, aged 88. He was succeeded in the baronetcy by his son Paul.

Parliament of the United Kingdom
Preceded by Colin Mark Patrick	Member of Parliament for Tavistock; 1942–1966	Succeeded by Michael Heseltine
Political offices
Preceded by Ernest Popplewell	Vice-Chamberlain of the Household; 1951–1956	Succeeded by Richard Thompson
Baronetage of the United Kingdom
New creation	Baronet (of Perridge); 1956–1987	Succeeded by Paul Studholme
