= Robert Phillimore =

English judge and politician (1810–1885)

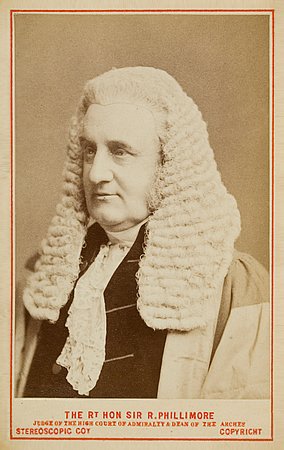
Sir Robert Phillimore.

Sir Robert Joseph Phillimore, 1st Baronet PC (5 November 1810 – 4 February 1885), was an English judge and politician. He was the last Judge of the High Court of Admiralty from 1867 to 1875 bringing an end to an office that had lasted nearly 400 years.

== Life ==
Born in Whitehall, he was the third son of Joseph Phillimore, a well-known ecclesiastical lawyer. Educated at Westminster School and Christ Church, Oxford, where a lifelong friendship with W. E. Gladstone began, his first appointment was to a clerkship in the board of control, where he remained from 1832 to 1835. Admitted as an advocate at Doctors' Commons in 1839, he was called to the bar at the Middle Temple in 1841, and rose very rapidly in his profession. He was engaged as counsel in almost every case of importance that came before the admiralty, probate or divorce courts, and became successively master of faculties, commissary of the deans and chapters of St. Paul's Cathedral and Westminster Cathedral, official of the arch deaconries of Middlesex and London, and chancellor of the dioceses of Chichester and Salisbury.

In 1853, he entered the House of Commons as Member of Parliament for Tavistock. A moderate in politics, his energies were devoted to non-party measures, and in 1854 he introduced the bill for allowing viva voce evidence in the ecclesiastical courts. He sat for Tavistock until 1857, when he offered himself as a candidate for Coventry, but was defeated. He was appointed judge of the Cinque Ports in 1855, Queen's Counsel in 1858, and advocate general in admiralty in 1862.

In 1867, he was sworn a member of the Privy Council and took his place as a member of the Judicial Committee. As a member of the Judicial Committee, one of his notable decisions was in the Guibord case, concerning church–state relations in Canada.

In 1875, in accordance with the Public Worship Regulation Act 1874, he resigned, and was succeeded by Lord Penzance. When the Judicature Act came into force the powers of the admiralty court were transferred to the High Court of Justice, and Sir Robert Phillimore was therefore the last judge of the historic court of the Lord High Admiral of England. He continued to sit as judge for the new admiralty, probate and divorce division until 1883, when he resigned. He wrote Ecclesiastical Law of the Church of England, Commentaries on International Law, and a translation of Lessing's Laokoon.

He married, in 1844, Charlotte Anne, daughter of John Denison of Ossington Hall, Newark. He was knighted in 1862, and created a baronet in 1881.

He died at Shiplake, near Henley-on-Thames, on 4 February 1885. His eldest son, Walter, also distinguished as an authority on ecclesiastical and admiralty law, became a judge of the high court in 1897 and was elevated to the peerage as Baron Phillimore in 1918.

== Arms ==
Coat of arms of Robert Phillimore
Crest In front of a tower Argent thereon a falcon volant Proper holding in the beak a lure Gold three cinqeufoils fesswise Or. Escutcheon Sable three bars indented Erminois in chief an anchor between two cinqeufoils Or. Supporters On either side an owl Proper each charged with an anchor Or. Motto Fortem Posce Animum (Pray for a Brave Soul)

== Sources ==
- Doe, Norman. "Phillimore, Sir Robert Joseph, baronet (1810–1885)". Oxford Dictionary of National Biography (online ed.). Oxford University Press. doi:10.1093/ref:odnb/22138. (Subscription, Wikipedia Library access or UK public library membership required.)

Parliament of the United Kingdom
Preceded by Samuel Carter; George Byng	Member of Parliament for Tavistock; 1853 – 1857; With: George Byng	Succeeded by Sir John Salusbury-Trelawny, Bt; George Byng
Baronetage of the United Kingdom
New creation	Baronet (of Shiplake); 1881–1885	Succeeded by Walter Phillimore
