= Samuel Carter (Tavistock MP) =

British Radical politician and lawyer

Member of Parliament for Tavistock
- In office 28 April 1852 – 21 February 1853 Serving with George Byng (July 1852–1853); Edward Russell (April 1852–July 1852)
- Preceded by: Edward Russell; John Salusbury-Trelawny
- Succeeded by: George Byng; Robert Phillimore

Personal details
- Born: 11 November 1814
- Died: 30 December 1903 (aged 89)
- Party: Radical
- Spouse: Caroline Bennison (m. 1858)
- Parent(s): John Carter; Sarah Green

Samuel Carter (11 November 1814 – 30 December 1903) was a British Radical politician and lawyer.

== Early life and career ==
Carter was the only son of John Carter and Sarah Green, daughter of John Laimbeer. He began his career in his family tannery business, but in 1844 quit to pursue a legal career, entering Middle Temple as a student in 1844, and being called to the bar in 1847. He practiced on the Western Circuit, where he often acted as defence counsel.

== Political career ==
He first stood for election Tavistock, seeking election on both a Radical and Chartist platform, as well as seeking the extension of the franchise including to women, in 1847 but was not elected until a by-election in April 1852. He campaigned on the grounds of judicial scrutiny, using his legal background. Yet, within nine weeks of his election, parliament was dissolved before he had even taken his seat.

While he was also returned at the general election in July of the same year, this was declared void on 21 February 1853 as he was "not duly qualified". A House of Commons select committee found that, despite Carter owning a home, a tannery, and shares in the local gas company, as well as a bank balance of £47 12s and 8d, he did not meet the property qualification and was unseated. Instead, Robert Phillimore was elected in his place.

Nevertheless, during this brief period of his career, Carter did cause furore in the Commons, after this time being able to take his seat. On 16 November 1852, he complained of the £80,000 cost for the funeral of the Duke of Wellington, five times more than to bury Lord Nelson.

Five years after his unseating, Parliament removed the property qualification for MPs.

== Later life ==
Carter, having been unseated, resumed his legal career, becoming a revising barrister - involving checking electoral rolls - before losing that job in 1894 after causing offence to too many people.

He married Caroline Bennison, daughter of John W Bennison, in 1858, and together they had one child: Reginald Llewellyn Bennison.

Parliament of the United Kingdom
Preceded by Edward Russell; John Salusbury-Trelawny	Member of Parliament for Tavistock; 1852 – 1853; With: George Byng (July 1852–1853); Edward Russell (April 1852–July 1852)	Succeeded by George Byng; Robert Phillimore
