= Arthur Rhodes (politician) =

New Zealand politician

The Honourable Arthur Rhodes OBE
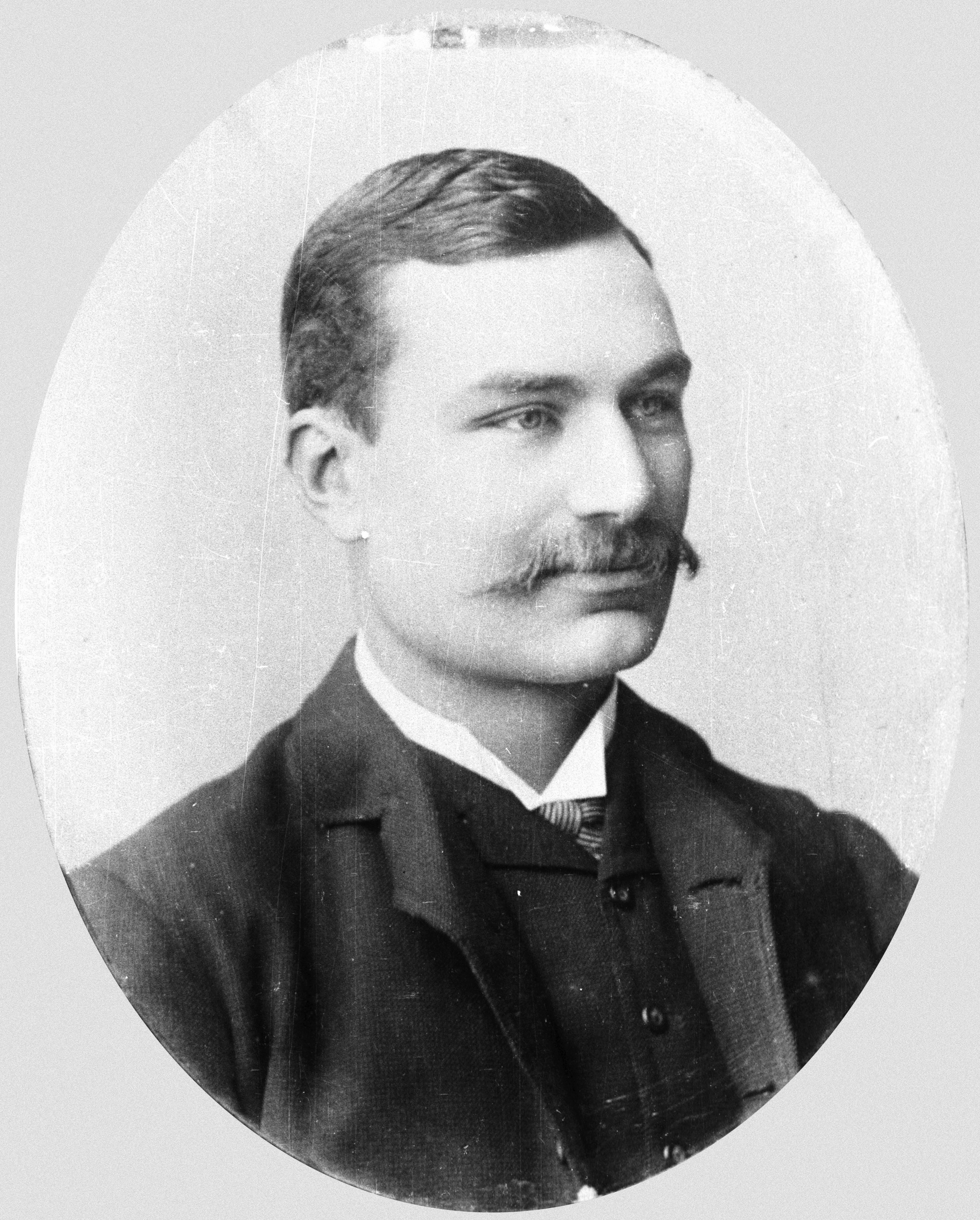
- Rhodes in c. 1887

Member of the New Zealand Parliament for Gladstone
- In office 1887–1890
- Preceded by: James Sutter
- Succeeded by: electorate abolished

Member of the New Zealand Parliament for Geraldine
- In office 1890–1893
- Preceded by: Electorate in abeyance
- Succeeded by: Electorate in abeyance

24th Mayor of Christchurch
- In office 1901–1902
- Preceded by: William Reece
- Succeeded by: Henry Wigram

Personal details
- Born: Arthur Edgar Gravenor Rhodes; 20 March 1859 The Levels near Timaru, New Zealand
- Died: 26 December 1922 (aged 63)
- Resting place: Bromley Cemetery, Christchurch
- Spouse: Rose Moorhouse (m. 1892)
- Relations: George Rhodes (father); William Barnard Rhodes (uncle); Robert Heaton Rhodes (uncle); Heaton Rhodes (cousin)

Arthur Edgar Gravenor Rhodes OBE (20 March 1859 – 26 December 1922) was a New Zealand member of parliament and mayor of Christchurch.

== Early life ==
Rhodes was the son of George Rhodes. He was born on his father's station, The Levels, near Timaru. He received his education at Christ's College, Christchurch, where he captained the cricket and the football teams. He then attended Jesus College, Cambridge. He graduated with a BA and L.L.B. from the English college in 1880. He was called to the bar at the Inner Temple in 1882 and in the same year, he returned to New Zealand.

== Professional career ==
Rhodes founded his own legal firm in Christchurch in 1884. Later, Michael Godby and John Heaton Rhodes became partners and the firm was called 'Rhodes Ross'. Alan Fraser from Rangiora merged with the firm, from which 'Rhodes Godby and Fraser' resulted, later to be renamed 'Rhodes Fraser & Co'. Today, the firm trades as 'Rhodes & Co' in Victoria Street, Christchurch, New Zealand.

Rhodes had a number of commercial interests. He was chairman of the New Zealand Shipping Company and chairman of The Press.

Rhodes was also variously president of the New Zealand Rugby Union, president of the Canterbury Rugby Union, chairman of the board of governors of Canterbury College/University of Canterbury.

== Te Koraha ==
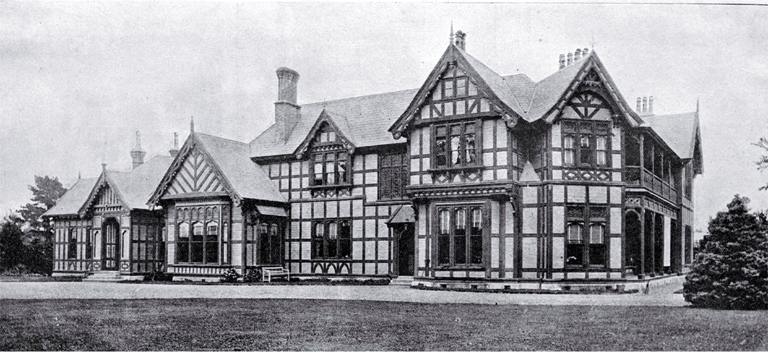
Te Koraha in 1901

After Rhodes returned from his tertiary education in England, he purchased 9 acres (3.6 ha) of land in Merivale, setting himself up for having a family and demonstrating his ambitions. He called the property Te Koraha, which is Māori for 'the wilderness'. Development started in 1884, when he had cottages removed and stables and a coach house built. Construction of the homestead, designed by Armson, Collins and Harman, started in 1886. It was enlarged in 1894 and became a centre of the social life of Christchurch.

Many important people stayed at Te Koraha, including Governors George Grey and Lord Islington. During his mayoralty, the Duke and Duchess of Cornwall and York were given use of Te Koraha while they stayed in Christchurch. Later in 1901, Robert Falcon Scott stayed there prior to leaving on the Discovery Expedition.

Upon Rhodes' death, the house passed on to his son Tahu, who sold it. It was leased by Rangi Ruru Girls' School, who used it as a boarding house until 2002, when it became their administration building. Extensively damaged in the February 2011 Christchurch earthquake, the building was restored and reopened in July 2012.

== Political career ==
Member of Parliament

New Zealand Parliament
Years	Term	Electorate	Party
1887–1890	10th	Gladstone	Independent
1890–1893	11th	Geraldine	Independent

Rhodes represented the Gladstone (1887–1890) and Geraldine (1890–1893) electorates. He was defeated in the 1893 general election for the Pareora electorate that replaced Geraldine by Frederick Flatman. Rhodes contested the Geraldine electorate in the 1896 election, but was again beaten by Flatman. He contested the Avon electorate in 1899 and was beaten by the incumbent, William Tanner.

"The Member for Geraldine", wrote a brutally frank parliamentary reporter, "has few of the requisites for a public speaker. His manner is singularly awkward. Words do not come readily to his bidding and when they do come they are not always employed in the right place" When he died, some obituaries stated that he was the first New Zealand-born member of parliament; this claim appeared, for example, in The New Zealand Herald and The Northern Advocate. However, this was incorrect, as John Sheehan was also a New Zealand-born European, but entered a parliament via an 1872 by-election in the Rodney electorate. The first New Zealand-born persons to enter parliament were Māori, though, and the first Māori elections were held in April 1868.

Local body politics

Christchurch mayoral elections had so far been held in the second half of December, but in 1900, that would have clashed with the Canterbury Jubilee celebrations (the First Four Ships first arrived in December 1850). Mayoral elections were postponed until April 1901. The incumbent, William Reece, declared in December 1900 that he could not serve another term due to other commitments, and shortly afterwards Rhodes received a requisition asking him to be nominated as mayoral candidate. At the nomination meeting on 16 April 1901, Rhodes was the only candidate and was thus declared elected unopposed. He was Mayor for one year and was succeeded by Henry Wigram, who was elected unopposed in 1902.

Rose Rhodes was President of Victoria League Canterbury between 1910 and 1917. The inaugural meeting of the Canterbury branch was held at Te Koraha.

== Family and death ==
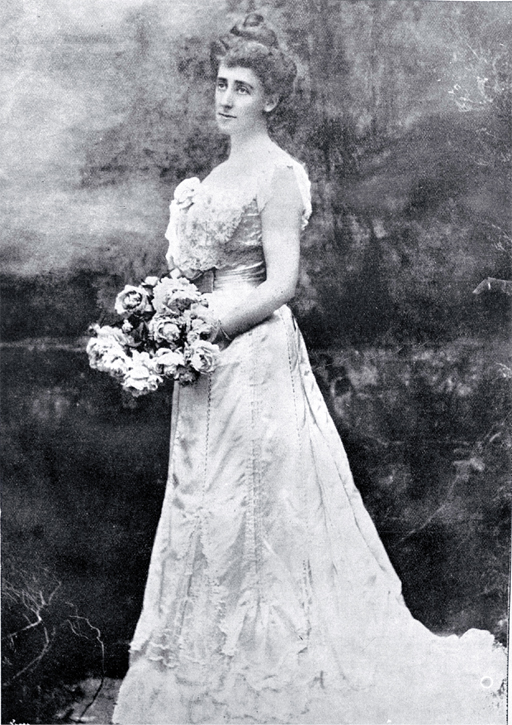
Rose Rhodes

On 10 February 1892, he married Rose Moorhouse. She was the youngest daughter of James William Moorhouse, who in turn was brother of William Sefton Moorhouse, the second Superintendent of Canterbury Province. The Rhodes had two children.

Their son, Arthur Tahu Gravenor (Tahu) Rhodes, was born on 2 August 1893. He served in World War I in Gallipoli and Egypt, before he was released due to ill health. On 24 January 1916, he married Helen Cecil Olive Plunket, the daughter of The Lord Plunket, who had been Governor of New Zealand in 1904–1910. Tahu Rhodes died in Kent, England, on 11 March 1947.

Their daughter, Rose Mairehau (Maire) Rhodes, was born on 23 July 1894 at Te Koraha. She married George Frederick Hutton at Christ Church, Down Street, Piccadilly. Maire Rhodes died in 1991. The Christchurch suburb of Mairehau is named after her; her father had land holdings in the area.

Rhodes died on 26 December 1922. He was buried the following day at Bromley Cemetery. Rose Rhodes died ten years later by falling 60 feet (18 m) from the window of her son's flat in Chelsea, London.

== Notes ==
New Zealand Parliament
Preceded by James Sutter	Member of Parliament for Gladstone; 1887–1890	Electorate abolished
In abeyance Title last held by William Rolleston	Member of Parliament for Geraldine; 1890–1893	In abeyance Title next held by Frederick Flatman
Political offices
Preceded by William Reece	Mayor of Christchurch; 1901–1902	Succeeded by Henry Wigram
Academic offices
Preceded by Thomas S. Weston	Chairman of the Board of Governors of Canterbury College; 1902–1904	Succeeded by Charles Lewis
