= George Parker (New Zealand politician) =

New Zealand politician

New Zealand Parliament
Years	Term	Electorate	Party
1871–1875	5th	Gladstone	Independent

George Babington Parker (3 September 1839 – 13 March 1915) was a nineteenth-century Member of Parliament in Canterbury, New Zealand.

Parker was born in 1839. His parents were the judge Sir James Parker and his wife Mary Parker (née Babington). His grandfather was Thomas Babington. Archibald Smith was his brother-in-law, and James Parker was his younger brother.

He represented the Gladstone electorate from 1871 to 1875 when he retired.

He died in London in 1915.

New Zealand Parliament
Preceded by Francis Jollie	Member of Parliament for Gladstone; 1871–1875	Succeeded by Frederick Teschemaker
