= Wallace Duffield Wright =

British soldier and politician (1875–1953)

Brigadier-General Wallace Duffield Wright VC CB CMG DSO
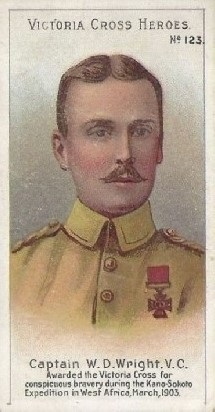
- Wright depicted on a cigarette card
- Born: 20 September 1875; Gibraltar
- Died: 25 March 1953 (aged 77); Chobham, Surrey
- Burial place: Brookwood Cemetery; 51.299790°N 0.629019°W
- Military career
- Allegiance: United Kingdom
- Branch: British Army
- Service years: 1893–1940
- Rank: Brigadier-General
- Units: Queen's Royal Regiment (West Surrey); Northern Nigeria Regiment (attached); Home Guard
- Commands: 8th Infantry Brigade
- Conflicts: Malakand Frontier War; Tirah Campaign; Kano-Sokoto Expedition; First World War; Second World War
- Awards: Victoria Cross; Companion of the Order of the Bath; Companion of the Order of St Michael and St George; Distinguished Service Order; Mentioned in dispatches Officer of the Legion of Honour (France)
- Other work: Member of Parliament (Conservative Party)

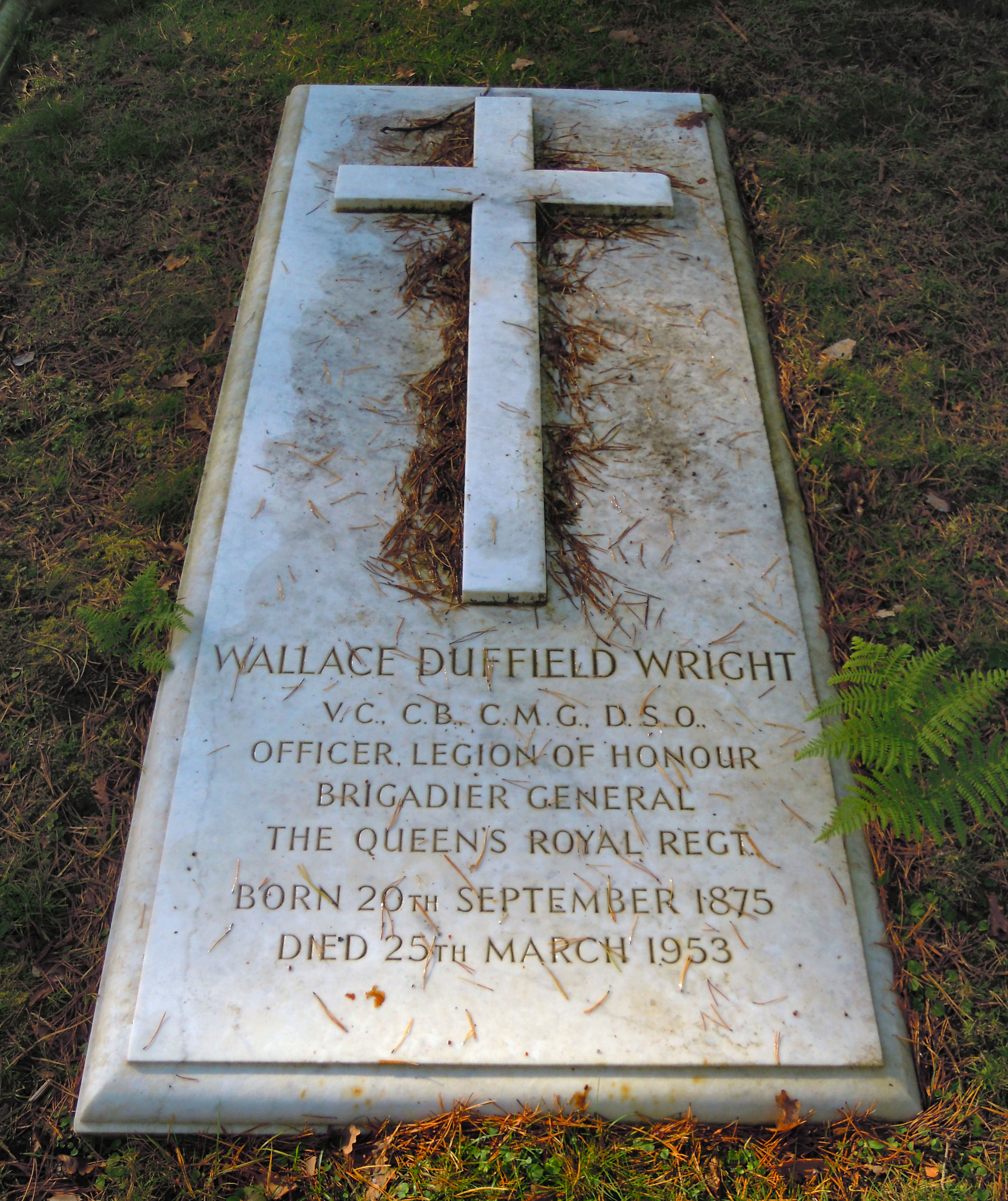
Grave of Wright in Brookwood Cemetery

Brigadier-General Wallace Duffield Wright, VC, CB, CMG, DSO (20 September 1875 – 25 March 1953) was a British soldier and politician. He was a recipient of the Victoria Cross, the highest award for gallantry in the face of the enemy that can be awarded to British and Commonwealth forces. After his military career, he served as the Conservative Member of Parliament for Tavistock from 1928 to 1931.

== Early life ==
Wright, the son of James Sykes Wright, was born in Gibraltar on 20 September 1875. He was educated at Cranbrook School, Kent. He joined the Militia in 1893, and was commissioned into the 1st Battalion of the Queen's Royal Regiment (West Surrey) in December 1896.

Wright served with the Malakand Field Force and the Tirah Expeditionary Force on the North West Frontier (1897–1898), during which he was severely wounded. He was awarded the India Medal with clasps for the Punjab Frontier and Tirah and was promoted to Lieutenant in September 1898.

== Victoria Cross action ==
In 1901 Wright was sent to North Nigeria, where he was attached to the Northern Nigeria Regiment, during Kano-Sokoto Expedition in Northern Nigeria.

On the 24th March, 1903, Lieutenant Wright, with only one [other] Officer and 44 men, took up a position in the path of the advancing enemy, and sustained the determined charges of 1,000 Horse and 2,000 Foot for two hours, and when the enemy, after heavy losses, fell back in good order, Lieutenant Wright continued to follow them up till they were in full retreat.

The personal example of this Officer, as well as his skilful leadership, contributed largely to the brilliant success of this affair.

He in no way infringed his orders by his daring initiative, as, though warned of the possibility of meeting large bodies of the enemy, he had purposely been left a free hand.

== Later military career ==
From 1904 to 1914 Wright held a number of staff positions, such as in April 1909 when he was seconded for service on the staff and was appointed a general staff officer, grade 3 (GSO3) at the War Office in London.

During the First World War he served in the Kamerun campaign in Central Africa from 1914–15 and in France from 1915–19, becoming a brevet major in July 1915, major in September, and brevet lieutenant colonel in 1916. In September that year he was appointed as general staff officer, grade 1, of the 18th (Eastern) Division. In July 1918, a temporary brigadier general when he was appointed as brigadier general, general staff (BGGS), of XVII Corps, taking over from Major General Ronald Charles. He was promoted to brevet colonel in January 1919.

Having reverted in rank due to the war's termination, he transferred to the Middlesex Regiment and was made a substantive lieutenant colonel in August 1920. Having been placed on the half-pay list in September 1922, he was made a colonel in March 1923, with seniority backdated to January 1919. He was then a staff officer with the British Army of the Rhine from 1923 to 1926 and commanded the 8th Infantry Brigade at Plymouth, 1925, an appointment he relinquished in July 1927, together with the temporary rank of colonel commandant.

He retired with the honorary rank of brigadier general in July 1927. In retirement he joined the Honourable Corps of Gentlemen at Arms and served in the Home Guard during World War II from 1940.

== As Member of Parliament ==
In 1928, Wright was elected at a by-election as Conservative Member of Parliament (MP) for Tavistock following the death of the sitting MP Philip Kenyon-Slaney. He was re-elected at the 1929 general election, but stood down at the 1931 general election.

He died at Chobham, Surrey, on 25 March 1953, aged 77.

== Honours and awards ==
Victoria Cross (VC)	1903
Companion of the Order of the Bath (CB)	1926
Companion of the Order of St Michael and St George (CMG)	1916
Companion of the Distinguished Service Order (DSO)	1918
Africa General Service Medal	
India Medal	
1914–15 Star	
British War Medal	
Victory Medal with bronze palm for mentioned in dispatches	
Defence Medal	
King George V Silver Jubilee Medal	1935
King George VI Coronation Medal	1937
Officer of the Legion of Honour	(France)

His VC was destroyed in the fire at The Queen's Royal Surrey Regiment Museum, Clandon Park, Surrey on 29 April 2015.

Parliament of the United Kingdom
Preceded by Philip Kenyon-Slaney	Member of Parliament for Tavistock; 1928–1931	Succeeded by Mark Patrick
