= Baron Phillimore =

Barony in the Peerage of the United Kingdom

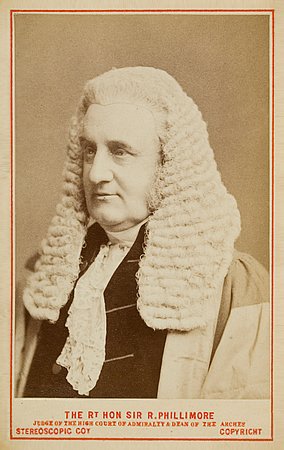
Sir Robert Phillimore, 1st Baronet

Baron Phillimore, of Shiplake in the County of Oxford, is a title in the Peerage of the United Kingdom. It was created in 1918 for the former Judge of the High Court of Justice and Lord Justice of Appeal, Sir Walter Phillimore, 2nd Baronet. The Phillimore Baronetcy, of The Coppice, had been created in the Baronetage of the United Kingdom on 28 December 1881 for his father Sir Robert Phillimore, who was also a noted lawyer and judge. The first Baron was succeeded by his son, the second Baron.

On his death the titles passed to his grandson, the third Baron, with his eldest son Captain the Hon. Anthony Francis Phillimore (1907–1940) having been killed in action during the Second World War. The third Baron was childless and was succeeded by his uncle, the fourth Baron. He was an architect.

As of 2025 the titles are held by his grandson, the sixth Baron, who succeeded in 2025.

== Phillimore Estate ==
The Phillimore family were formerly owners, and now trustees, of the Phillimore Estate in Kensington, west London, covering the prosperous 19th century houses around Holland Park and Campden Hill.

The family also controls Coppid Farming Enterprises, a landowner with an interest in the Crichel Down estate.

The fourth Baron owned Villa Foscari, a masterpiece of Palladio and now a Unesco World Heritage site. The fifth Baron was a prominent polo player, the founder of Binfield Heath Polo Club, and was made a Life Member of the Hurlingham Polo Association in 2021. His successor, the sixth Baron, is also a polo player.

== Phillimore Baronets, of The Coppice (1881) ==
- Sir Robert Joseph Phillimore, 1st Baronet (1810–1885)
- Sir Walter George Frank Phillimore, 2nd Baronet (1845–1929) (created Baron Phillimore in 1918)

== Barons Phillimore (1918) ==
- Walter George Frank Phillimore, 1st Baron Phillimore (1845–1929)
- Godfrey Walter Phillimore, 2nd Baron Phillimore (1879–1947)
- Robert Godfrey Phillimore, 3rd Baron Phillimore (1939–1990)
- Claud Stephen Phillimore, 4th Baron Phillimore (1911–1994)
- Francis Stephen Phillimore, 5th Baron Phillimore (1944–2025)
- Tristan Anthony Stephen Phillimore, 6th Baron Phillimore (born 1977)

The heir is the present holder's son, the Hon. Milo Arthur Francis Phillimore (born 2020)

Coat of arms of Baron Phillimore
Crest In front of a tower Argent thereon a falcon volant Proper holding in the beak a lure Gold three cinqeufoils fesswise Or. Escutcheon Sable three bars indented Erminois in chief an anchor between two cinqeufoils Or. Supporters On either side an owl Proper each charged with an anchor Or. Motto Fortem Posce Animum (Pray For A Brave Soul)

Baronetage of the United Kingdom
Preceded by Stewart baronets	Phillimore baronets of Shiplake; 28 December 1881	Succeeded by Sullivan baronets
