= 1942 Tavistock by-election =

UK Parliamentary by-election

The 1942 Tavistock by-election was held on 2 April 1942. The by-election was held due to the death of the incumbent Conservative MP, Mark Patrick. It was won by the Conservative candidate Henry Studholme, who was unopposed due to the War-time electoral pact.
