= Maxwell Thornton =

English lawyer and politician (1878–1950)

Maxwell Thornton

Maxwell Ruthven Thornton (11 July 1878 – 30 August 1950) was an English Liberal politician and lawyer․

== Early life ==
Thornton was the son of George Ruthven Thornton MA, the Vicar of St Barnabas’ church in Kensington. He was educated at St Paul's School (London). He went into the law, becoming a solicitor in 1901. In 1903 he was appointed Advocate and Solicitor to the Straits Settlements in South East Asia and from April until October 1908, he served as an Acting Member of the Legislative Council of the Straits Settlements. In 1909 he married Katherine Yates and they had one daughter.

== Member of Parliament for Tavistock ==
Thornton was elected as Liberal Member of Parliament (MP) for Tavistock at the 1922 general election enjoying a majority of 1,051 over his Conservative opponent. As soon as he was in Parliament, Thornton was drawn into the efforts to reunite the National, or Lloyd George Liberals with the Independent Liberals led by H H Asquith. He called a meeting of both sides of the party, held in the House of Commons on 27 November 1922 which according to the report in the Times newspaper was attended by about 70 MPs but the official record of which indicates that there were nearly one hundred MPs present. There was lots of goodwill and fraternal sounding speeches but beyond fine words the meeting did not bring about any definite conclusion. On the contrary, although Lloyd George appeared willing to continue negotiation, even letting it be known he would be willing to serve under Asquith, Asquith was hostile. In some respects Thornton's initiative on Liberal reunion proved to be counter-productive. One outcome of Thornton's meeting was Asquith's sacking of his Chief Whip James Myles Hogge in February 1923 because he supported reunion and his replacement by Vivian Phillipps, Liberal MP for Edinburgh West who was strongly opposed.

At the 1923 general election Thornton held his seat, having what was at that time described a ‘strong hold on this agricultural constituency’ – although his majority increased only slightly over its 1922 total to one of 1,811 votes. In 1924 he was appointed as one of the Liberal Whips.

== The 1924 general election ==
The 1924 general election was a disaster for the Liberal Party, with net losses of 118 seats. Thornton, who had previously been well supported in his largely agricultural seat, was defeated by the Conservative candidate Major Philip Kenyon-Slaney (who had also been his opponent in 1922 and 1923) and who was returned with a majority of 1,272. In the general election campaign the Tories played strongly on rural grievances. Despite Thornton's arguing that only a Liberal government could provide security for the farmer and good wages for the agricultural labourer, and his reputation for being on the Right of his party the Tories led by Stanley Baldwin came to be regarded as the champion of the countryside against the urban areas and London based politicians. In addition the appearance of many more Labour candidates in 1924, together with a plea from Labour for its supporters not to vote at all in those seats it was not contesting meant that Liberals were fighting many more three-cornered contests and not picking up enough votes from agricultural labourers in straight fights. Asquith lost his seat in the 1924 election, Lloyd George became party leader and a ferment of new ideas and policy initiatives flowed forward in the next few years. One such policy called for a form of land nationalisation as set out in the publication Land and the Nation (or Green Book). This was a step too far for some former MPs from rural areas and Thornton resigned from the party in protest in 1925 and at what he described as "coquetting with Socialism".

== Death ==
Thornton died at Hove in Sussex aged 73 in 1950.

Parliament of the United Kingdom
Preceded by Charles Williams	Member of Parliament for Tavistock; 1922 – 1924	Succeeded by Philip Kenyon-Slaney
