= William E. Bentley =

American academic

- Born: April 27, 1960; Denver, Colorado, U.S.
- Education: Cornell University, University of Colorado, Boulder
- Scientific career
- Fields: Bioengineering
- Workplaces: University of Maryland

William E. Bentley is an American academic who is the Robert E. Fischell Distinguished Professor of Engineering, founding Director of the Fischell Institute for Biomedical Devices, and the Director of the Maryland Technology Enterprise Institute in the A. James Clark School of Engineering at the University of Maryland. He was previously the Chair of the Fischell Department of Bioengineering, where he assisted in establishing the department.

Bentley is also appointed in the Department of Chemical and Biomolecular Engineering at the University of Maryland, College Park and the Institute for Bioscience and Biotechnology Research. He has served on advisory committees and panels for the NIH, NSF, DOD, DOE, USDA, and several state agencies.

== Education and research ==
Bentley received his undergraduate (BS, '82) and Master of Engineering degrees ('83) from Cornell University and his Ph.D. ('89) from the University of Colorado, Boulder, all in chemical engineering. Bentley worked for the International Paper Company, on alternative fuels and recovery process improvement.

He was an integral component in the creation of the Bioprocess Scale-Up Facility (BSF) at the University of Maryland. While associated with the BSF, the facility performed contract research projects for MedImmune (Synagis) and Martek (Life's DHA).

== Awards and achievements ==
- Distinguished University Professor (UMD)
- Member, International Scientific Advisory Board, Austrian Center of Industrial Biotechnology (ACIB) (2009)
- Elected Member, Managing Board, Society for Biological Engineers (2008)
- Fellow, American Academy of Microbiology (AAM)
- Fellow, American Association for the Advancement of Science
- Fellow, American Institute for Medical and Biological Engineering
- Research Initiation Award, National Science Foundation. (1990)
