= Roger W. Baker =

American government official

Roger W. Baker was the assistant secretary and the chief information officer (CIO) for the Department of Veterans Affairs. He directly managed an organization of over 7,500 information technology (IT) professionals and a budget of over $4 billion. He was nominated by U.S. President Barack Obama to serve as the assistant secretary for information and technology, and was confirmed by the United States Senate on May 18, 2009.

Prior to his appointment, Baker was most recently president and chief executive officer of Dataline LLC, a mid-sized IT services and integration company based in Norfolk, Virginia. Prior to joining Dataline, Baker was CIO at General Dynamics Information Technology, and executive vice president and general manager of the Telecommunications and Information Assurance business group for CACI International Inc.

From 1998 to 2001, Baker was the CIO at the U.S. Department of Commerce, where he led efforts to convert old systems and processes to e-commerce, improve technology management, reduce costs, and create the Federal CIO position.

Prior to his federal service, Baker had a successful career in high technology, helping to grow and sell three software/Internet companies. He served as the chief operating officer (COO) of BlueGill Technologies, a market leader in Internet bill presentment; as vice president of engineering and operations at VISA International, where he was responsible for the creation and operation of the VISA Interactive Banking System; and as vice president of consulting and services for Verdix Corporation.

Baker has a Bachelor of Science degree in computer science and a master's degree in business administration, both from the University of Michigan.
