= Studholme baronets =

Baronetcy in the Baronetage of the United Kingdom

The Studholme Baronetcy, of Perridge in the County of Devon, is a title in the Baronetage of the United Kingdom. It was created on 3 July 1956 for the Conservative politician Henry Studholme. As of 2012 the title is held by his grandson Sir Henry William Studholme, the third Baronet, who succeeded his father in 1990.

== Studholme baronets, of Perridge (1956) ==
- Sir Henry Gray Studholme, 1st Baronet (1899–1987)
- Sir Paul Henry William Studholme, 2nd Baronet (1930–1990)
- Sir Henry William Studholme, 3rd Baronet (born 1958)

The heir apparent is the present holder's eldest son Joshua Henry Paul Studholme (born 1992)

== See also ==
- Studholme Hodgson
