= William Bentley (MP) =

English politician

William Bentley (fl. 1396–1423) was an English politician. He sat as MP for Tavistock in 1420 and Mayor of Plymouth from Michaelmas 1399 til 1400, 1408 till 1409, 1412 till 1413, and 1417 till 1418.

He also served as commissioner of arrest in Plymouth in October and November 1396; commissioner to defend merchant shipping in August 1403; commissioner to fortify Plymouth in February 1404; lieutenant to Edward, Earl of Rutland from 1397 till 1398; searcher in Fowey, Plymouth, Dartmouth, and Exeter from 12 June 1413 till 5 May 1417; and collector of customs and subsidies in Fowey and Plymouth from 12 December 1419 till November 1423.

He possibly had one son.
