= Tavistock (constituency) =

Parliamentary constituency in the United Kingdom, 1330–1974

- Former county constituency for the House of Commons

1885–February 1974
- Seats: one
- Replaced by: West Devon

1330–1885
- Seats: two (1330–1868), one (1868–1885)
- Type of constituency: Borough constituency

Tavistock was a parliamentary constituency in Devon, England between 1330 and 1974. Until the 1885 election it was a parliamentary borough, consisting solely of the town of Tavistock; it returned two Members of Parliament to the House of Commons of the Parliament of the United Kingdom until 1868, when its representation was reduced to one member. From 1885, the name was transferred to a single-member county constituency covering a much larger area. (Between 1885 and 1918, the constituency had the alternative name of West Devon.)

The constituency was abolished for the February 1974 general election, when it was largely replaced by the new West Devon constituency.

== Boundaries ==
1885–1918: The Municipal Boroughs of Devonport and Plymouth, and the Sessional Divisions of Hatherleigh, Holsworthy, Lifton, Midland Roborough, and Tavistock.

1918–1950: The Urban Districts of Holsworthy, Ivybridge, and Tavistock, the Rural Districts of Broadwoodwidger, Plympton St Mary, and Tavistock, and part of the Rural District of Holsworthy.

1950–1951: The Urban Districts of Holsworthy and Tavistock, the Rural Districts of Broadwoodwidger, Holsworthy, and Tavistock, and the Rural District of Plympton St Mary except the parishes of Bickleigh and Tamerton Foliot.

1951–1974: The Urban Districts of Holsworthy and Tavistock, the Rural Districts of Broadwoodwidger, Holsworthy, and Tavistock, and the Rural District of Plympton St Mary less the parts of the parishes of Bickleigh and Tamerton Foliot added to the county borough of Plymouth by the Plymouth Extension Act 1950.

In 1965 Tavistock was one of the largest seats in England, in terms of land area. It included the towns of Plympton and Plymstock (effectively eastern suburbs of Plymouth). It also included a great deal of rural land, including two-thirds of Dartmoor.

== Members of Parliament ==
=== MPs 1330–1640 ===
Parliament	First member	Second member
1335	Richard Crocker	
Oct. 1377	Thomas Raymond	
1381	Peter Hadley	
1384		Thomas Raymond
1386	John Wyndout	John Tryll
1388 (Feb)	Ranulph Hunt	John atte Pole
1388 (Sep)	John Ford	William Walreddon
1390 (Jan)	Walter Milemead	John Bithewater
1390 (Nov)		
1391	Ranulph Hunt	John Whitham
1393	Ranulph Hunt	Matthew Row
1394	Ranulph Hunt	John Crocker
1395	Ranulph Hunt	Walter Dimmock
1397 (Jan)	William Whitham	John Plenty
1397 (Sep)		
1399		
1401		
1402	Ranulph Hunt	John Kene
1404 (Jan)		
1404 (Oct)		
1406	John Plenty	Roger Baker
1407	John Godfrey	William Brit
1410		
1411	John Lopynford	Richard Secheville
1413 (Feb)		
1413 (May)	William May	John Julkin
1414 (Apr)		
1414 (Nov)	William May	John Julkin
1415		
1416 (Mar)		
1416 (Oct)		
1417		
1419	Richard Secheville	?
1420	Richard Secheville	William Bentley
1421 (May)	John Fortescue	William May
1421 (Dec)	John Fortescue	Nicholas Fitzherbert
1467–1468	Richard Edgcumbe	
1472	John Say	
1485	Richard Edgcumbe	
1510-1512	No names known	
1515	Richard Lybbe	John Amadas
1523	?	
1529	William Honychurch	John Dynham
1536	?	
1539	?	
1542	?	
1545	Sir Peter Carew	Richard Fortescue
1547	Sir Edward Rogers	John Gale
1553 (Mar)	Edward Underhill	Anthony Lyte
1553 (Nov)	Richard Wilbraham	Thomas Smyth
Parliament of 1554	Richard Mayo	John Fitz, junior
Parliament of 1554–1555	John Onebyche	John Fitz, junior
Parliament of 1555	Richard Mayo	Thomas Southcote
Parliament of 1558	Thomas Browne	George Southcote
Parliament of 1559	Unknown: the return has been lost	
Parliament of 1563–1567	Sir Nicholas Throckmorton	Richard Cooke
Parliament of 1571	Nathaniel Bacon	Robert Ferrers died after 1572; In his place Charles Morison
Parliament of 1572–1581	Nathaniel Bacon	Robert Ferrers died after 1572; In his place Charles Morison
Parliament of 1584–1585	Edward Bacon	Valentine Knightley
Parliament of 1586–1587	John Glanville	Valentine Knightley
Parliament of 1588–1589	Michael Heneage	Anthony Ashley
Parliament of 1593	Hugh Vaughan	Richard Codrington
Parliament of 1597–1598	Edward Montagu	Valentine Knightley
Parliament of 1601	Henry Grey	Walter Wentworth
Parliament of 1604–1611	Sir George Fleetwood	Edward Duncombe
Addled Parliament (1614)	(Sir) Francis Glanville	Edward Duncombe
Parliament of 1621–1622	(Sir) Francis Glanville	Sir Baptist Hicks, Bt
Happy Parliament (1624–1625)	Sampson Hele	John Pym
Useless Parliament (1625)	Sir Francis Glanville	John Pym
Parliament of 1625–1626	Sir John Ratcliffe	John Pym
Parliament of 1628–1629	Sir Francis Glanville	John Pym
No Parliament summoned 1629-1640

=== MPs 1640–1868 ===
Year	First member	First party	Second member	Second party
April 1640	Lord Russell	Royalist	John Pym	Parliamentarian
November 1640	Lord Russell	Royalist	John Pym	Parliamentarian
1641	Hon. John Russell	Royalist	John Pym	Parliamentarian
December 1643	Hon. John Russell	Royalist	Pym died - seat vacant	
January 1644	Russell disabled from sitting - seat vacant		Pym died - seat vacant	
1646	Elisha Crimes		Edward Fowell	
December 1648	Crimes and Fowell excluded in Pride's Purge - both seats vacant			
1653	Tavistock was unrepresented in the Barebones Parliament and the First and Second Parliaments of the Protectorate			
January 1659	Henry Hatsell		Edmund Fowell	
May 1659	Not represented in the restored Rump			
April 1660	William Russell	Whig	George Howard	
April 1661	Sir John Davie, 2nd Baronet		George Howard	
December 1661	Lord Russell	Whig	George Howard	
1673	Lord Russell	Whig	Sir Francis Drake, 3rd Baronet	
1679	Edward Russell	Whig	Sir Francis Drake, 3rd Baronet	
1685	Sir James Butler		John Beare	
1689	Lord Robert Russell		Sir Francis Drake, Bt	
1695	Lord Robert Russell		Lord James Russell	
March 1696	Lord Robert Russell		Ambrose Manaton	
November 1696	Lord Robert Russell		Sir Francis Drake, Bt	
1701	Lord Robert Russell		Lord Edward Russell	Whig
1702	Lord Robert Russell		Lord James Russell	
November 1703	James Bulteel		Lord James Russell	
December 1703	James Bulteel		Henry Manaton	Tory
1708	Sir John Cope, Bt	Whig	Henry Manaton	Tory
1711	Sir John Cope, Bt	Whig	James Bulteel	
1715	Sir John Cope, Bt	Whig	Sir Francis Henry Drake, Bt	
1728	Sir Humphrey Monoux, Bt	Tory	Sir Francis Henry Drake, Bt	
1734	Hon. Charles Fane	Whig	Sidney Meadows	
1741	Hon. Charles Fane	Whig	Lord Sherard Manners	
1742	Hon. Charles Fane	Whig	The Viscount of Limerick	
July 1747	Richard Leveson-Gower		Thomas Brand	
December 1747	Sir Richard Wrottesley, Bt		Thomas Brand	
April 1754	Richard Rigby	Whig	Jeffrey French	
December 1754	Richard Rigby	Whig	Richard Vernon	
1761	Richard Rigby	Whig	Richard Neville Aldworth	
1774	Richard Rigby	Whig	Hon. Richard FitzPatrick	Whig
1788	Lord John Russell	Whig	Hon. Richard FitzPatrick	Whig
June 1790	Hon. Charles Wyndham	Whig	Hon. Richard FitzPatrick	Whig
December 1790	Lord John Russell	Whig	Hon. Richard FitzPatrick	Whig
1802	Lord Robert Spencer	Whig	Hon. Richard FitzPatrick	Whig
May 1807	Lord William Russell	Whig	Hon. Richard FitzPatrick	Whig
July 1807	Lord William Russell	Whig	Viscount Howick	Whig
1808	Lord William Russell	Whig	George Ponsonby	Whig
1812	Lord William Russell	Whig	Richard FitzPatrick	Whig
1813	Lord William Russell	Whig	Lord John Russell	Whig
1817	Lord William Russell	Whig	Lord Robert Spencer	Whig
1818	Lord William Russell	Whig	Lord John Russell	Whig
1819	John Peter Grant	Whig	Lord John Russell	Whig
March 1820	John Peter Grant	Whig	John Nicholas Fazakerly	Whig
May 1820	John Peter Grant	Whig	Viscount Ebrington	Whig
1826	Lord William Russell	Whig	Viscount Ebrington	Whig
August 1830	Lord Russell	Whig	Viscount Ebrington	Whig
November 1830	Lord Russell	Whig	Lord John Russell	Whig
July 1831	Lord Russell	Whig	John Heywood Hawkins	Whig
October 1831	Lieutenant Colonel Francis Russell	Whig	John Heywood Hawkins	Whig
1832	Lord Russell	Whig	Charles Richard Fox	Whig
1835	Lord Russell	Whig	John Rundle	Whig
1841	Lord Edward Russell	Whig	John Rundle	Whig
1843	Lord Edward Russell	Whig	John Salusbury Trelawny	Radical
1847	Hon. Edward Russell	Whig	John Salusbury Trelawny	Radical
April 1852	Hon. Edward Russell	Whig	Samuel Carter	Radical
July 1852	Hon. George Byng	Whig	Samuel Carter	Radical
1853	Hon. George Byng	Whig	Robert Phillimore	Peelite
March 1857	Hon. George Byng	Whig	Sir John Salusbury Trelawny	Radical
September 1857	Arthur Russell	Whig	Sir John Salusbury Trelawny	Radical
1859	Arthur Russell	Liberal	Sir John Salusbury Trelawny	Liberal
1865	Arthur Russell	Liberal	Joseph d'Aguilar Samuda	Liberal
1868	Representation reduced to one member			

=== MPs 1868–1974 ===
Election	Member	Party
1868	Arthur Russell	Liberal
1885	Viscount Ebrington	Liberal
1886	Viscount Ebrington	Liberal Unionist
1892	Hugh Luttrell	Liberal
1900	John Spear	Liberal Unionist
1906	Hugh Luttrell	Liberal
Dec. 1910	Sir John Spear	Liberal Unionist
1918	Charles Williams	Conservative
1922	Maxwell Ruthven Thornton	Liberal
1924	Philip Kenyon-Slaney	Unionist
1928 by-election	Wallace Duffield Wright	Conservative
1931	Colin Patrick	Conservative
1942 by-election	Sir Henry Studholme, Bt	Conservative
1966	Michael Heseltine	Conservative
Feb 1974	constituency abolished: see West Devon	

== Elections ==
=== Elections in the 1830s ===
General election 1830: Tavistock
Party	Candidate	Votes	%
Whig	William Russell	Unopposed	
Whig	Hugh Fortescue	Unopposed	
Registered electors		c. 30	
Whig hold			
Whig hold			

Fortescue chose to sit for Devon where he had also been elected, causing a by-election.

By-election, 27 November 1830: Tavistock
Party	Candidate	Votes	%
Whig	John Russell	Unopposed	
Registered electors		c. 30	
Whig hold			

General election 1831: Tavistock
Party	Candidate	Votes	%
Whig	William Russell	Unopposed	
Whig	John Russell	Unopposed	
Registered electors		c. 30	
Whig hold			
Whig hold			

John Russell was also elected for Devon and opted to sit there, causing a by-election.

By-election, 13 July 1831: Tavistock
Party	Candidate	Votes	%
Whig	John Heywood Hawkins	Unopposed	
Registered electors		c. 30	
Whig hold			

William Russell resigned, causing a by-election.

By-election, 25 October 1831: Tavistock
Party	Candidate	Votes	%
Whig	Francis Russell (British Army officer)	Unopposed	
Registered electors		c. 30	
Whig hold			

General election 1832: Tavistock
Party	Candidate	Votes	%
Whig	William Russell	159	45.2
Whig	Charles Richard Fox	129	36.6
Whig	Sir Francis Charles Knowles, 3rd Baronet	64	18.2
Majority		65	18.4
Turnout		193	78.1
Registered electors		247	
Whig hold			
Whig hold			

General election 1835: Tavistock
Party	Candidate	Votes	%	±%
Whig	William Russell	167	52.7	+7.5
Whig	John Rundle	145	45.7	+9.1
Whig	Sir Francis Charles Knowles, 3rd Baronet	5	1.6	−16.6
Majority		140	44.1	+25.7
Turnout		178	61.6	−16.5
Registered electors		289		
Whig hold				
Whig hold				

General election 1837: Tavistock
Party	Candidate	Votes	%
Whig	William Russell	Unopposed	
Whig	John Rundle	Unopposed	
Registered electors		329	
Whig hold			
Whig hold			

=== Elections in the 1840s ===
General election 1841: Tavistock
Party	Candidate	Votes	%	±%
Whig	John Rundle	Unopposed		
Whig	Edward Russell	Unopposed		
Registered electors		275		
Whig hold				
Whig hold				

Rundle resigned by accepting the office of Steward of the Chiltern Hundreds, causing a by-election.

By-election, 16 March 1843: Tavistock
Party	Candidate	Votes	%	±%
Radical	John Salusbury-Trelawny	113	62.1	N/A
Chartist	Henry Vincent	69	37.9	New
Majority		44	24.2	N/A
Turnout		182	68.9	N/A
Registered electors		264		
Radical gain from Whig		Swing	N/A	

General election 1847: Tavistock
Party	Candidate	Votes	%	±%
Whig	Edward Russell	153	34.4	N/A
Radical	John Salusbury-Trelawny	150	33.7	N/A
Peelite	Robert Phillimore	86	19.3	New
Radical	Samuel Carter	56	12.6	N/A
Turnout		223 (est)	70.6 (est)	N/A
Registered electors		315		
Majority		3	0.7	N/A
Whig hold		Swing	N/A	
Majority		64	14.4	N/A
Radical gain from Whig		Swing	N/A	

=== Elections in the 1850s ===
Trelawny resigned to seek re-election after voting against the disestablishment of the Church of England when he had promised his constituents he would vote for it.

By-election, 28 April 1852: Tavistock
Party	Candidate	Votes	%	±%
Radical	Samuel Carter	115	40.5	+27.9
Radical	John Salusbury-Trelawny	89	31.3	−2.4
Peelite	Robert Phillimore	80	28.2	+8.9
Majority		26	9.2	−5.2
Turnout		284	81.4	+10.8
Registered electors		349		
Radical hold		Swing	+15.2	

General election 1852: Tavistock
Party	Candidate	Votes	%	±%
Whig	George Byng	220	44.6	+10.2
Radical	Samuel Carter	169	34.3	−12.0
Peelite	Robert Phillimore	104	21.1	+1.8
Turnout		247 (est)	70.6 (est)	—
Registered electors		349		
Majority		51	10.3	+9.6
Whig hold		Swing	+8.1	
Majority		65	13.2	−1.2
Radical hold		Swing	−8.6	

On petition, Carter was unseated in 1853 and Phillimore was declared elected in his place.

General election 1857: Tavistock
Party	Candidate	Votes	%	±%
Whig	George Byng	242	42.5	−2.1
Radical	John Salusbury-Trelawny	198	34.7	N/A
Radical	Samuel Carter	130	22.8	−11.5
Turnout		285 (est)	72.2 (est)	+1.6
Registered electors		395		
Majority		44	7.7	−2.6
Whig hold		Swing	+4.7	
Majority		68	11.9	−1.3
Radical hold		Swing	−4.7	

Byng resigned in order to contest a by-election in Middlesex, causing a by-election.

By-election, 4 September 1857: Tavistock
Party	Candidate	Votes	%	±%
Whig	Arthur Russell	164	57.7	+15.2
Radical	Edward Miall	120	42.3	−15.2
Majority		44	15.4	+7.7
Turnout		284	71.9	−0.3
Registered electors		395		
Whig hold		Swing	+15.2	

General election 1859: Tavistock
Party	Candidate	Votes	%	±%
Liberal	Arthur Russell	Unopposed		
Liberal	John Salusbury-Trelawny	Unopposed		
Registered electors		414		
Liberal hold				
Liberal hold				

=== Elections in the 1860s ===
General election 1865: Tavistock
Party	Candidate	Votes	%	±%
Liberal	Arthur Russell	330	45.3	N/A
Liberal	Joseph d'Aguilar Samuda	179	24.6	N/A
Liberal	Samuel Carter	119	16.3	N/A
Conservative	Francis Rummens	93	12.8	New
Liberal	Theophilus Alexander Blakely	8	1.1	N/A
Majority		60	8.3	N/A
Turnout		411 (est)	96.5 (est)	N/A
Registered electors		426		
Liberal hold				
Liberal hold				

Seat reduced to one member

General election 1868: Tavistock
Party	Candidate	Votes	%	±%
Liberal	Arthur Russell	Unopposed		
Registered electors		802		
Liberal hold				

=== Elections in the 1870s ===
General election 1874: Tavistock
Party	Candidate	Votes	%	±%
Liberal	Lord Arthur Russell	362	57.0	N/A
Liberal	Russell Hugh Worthington Biggs	273	43.0	N/A
Majority		89	14.0	N/A
Turnout		635	78.9	N/A
Registered electors		805		
Liberal hold				

=== Elections in the 1880s ===
General election 1880: Tavistock
Party	Candidate	Votes	%	±%
Liberal	Lord Arthur Russell	Unopposed		
Registered electors		847		
Liberal hold				

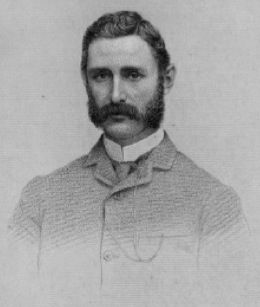
Ebrington

General election 1885: Tavistock
Party	Candidate	Votes	%	±%
Liberal	Viscount Ebrington	5,390	63.0	N/A
Conservative	Henry Imbert-Terry	3,172	37.0	New
Majority		2,218	26.0	N/A
Turnout		8,562	78.9	N/A
Registered electors		10,851		
Liberal hold		Swing	N/A	

General election 1886: Tavistock
Party	Candidate	Votes	%	±%
Liberal Unionist	Viscount Ebrington	3,917	59.0	+22.0
Liberal	John Budd Phear	2,722	41.0	−22.0
Majority		1,195	18.0	N/A
Turnout		6,639	61.2	−17.7
Registered electors		10,851		
Liberal Unionist gain from Liberal		Swing	+22.0	

=== Elections in the 1890s ===
Hugh Luttrell

General election 1892: Tavistock
Party	Candidate	Votes	%	±%
Liberal	Hugh Luttrell	4,458	51.2	+10.2
Liberal Unionist	Robert Thomas White-Thomson	4,241	48.8	−10.2
Majority		217	2.4	N/A
Turnout		8,699	74.2	+13.0
Registered electors		11,720		
Liberal gain from Liberal Unionist		Swing	+10.2	

General election 1895: Tavistock
Party	Candidate	Votes	%	±%
Liberal	Hugh Luttrell	4,970	51.9	+0.7
Liberal Unionist	Robert Thomas White-Thomson	4,597	48.1	−0.7
Majority		373	3.8	+1.4
Turnout		9,567	78.7	+4.5
Registered electors		12,154		
Liberal hold		Swing	+0.7	

=== Elections in the 1900s ===
General election 1900: Tavistock
Party	Candidate	Votes	%	±%
Liberal Unionist	John Spear	4,746	50.1	+2.0
Liberal	John Fellowes Wallop, 7th Earl of Portsmouth	4,731	49.9	−2.0
Majority		15	0.2	N/A
Turnout		9,477	77.7	−1.0
Registered electors		12,202		
Liberal Unionist gain from Liberal		Swing	+2.0	

General election 1906: Tavistock
Party	Candidate	Votes	%	±%
Liberal	Hugh Luttrell	6,405	55.2	+5.3
Liberal Unionist	John Spear	5,196	44.8	−5.3
Majority		1,209	10.4	N/A
Turnout		11,601	82.9	+5.2
Registered electors		13,989		
Liberal gain from Liberal Unionist		Swing	+5.3	

=== Elections in the 1910s ===
General election January 1910: Tavistock
Party	Candidate	Votes	%	±%
Liberal	Hugh Luttrell	6,570	50.9	−4.3
Liberal Unionist	John Spear	6,343	49.1	+4.3
Majority		227	1.8	−8.6
Turnout		12,913	83.9	+1.0
Registered electors		15,395		
Liberal hold		Swing	−4.3	

General election December 1910: Tavistock
Party	Candidate	Votes	%	±%
Liberal Unionist	John Spear	6,409	51.6	+2.5
Liberal	Hugh Luttrell	6,019	48.4	−2.5
Majority		390	3.2	N/A
Turnout		12,428	80.7	−3.2
Registered electors		15,395		
Liberal Unionist gain from Liberal		Swing	+2.5	

General Election 1914–15:

Another General Election was required to take place before the end of 1915. The political parties had been making preparations for an election to take place and by July 1914, the following candidates had been selected;

- Unionist: John Spear
- Liberal: Oliver Brett

General election 1918: Tavistock
Party		Candidate	Votes	%	±%
C	Unionist	Charles Williams	9,157	56.7	+5.1
	Liberal	Harry Geen	7,005	43.3	−5.1
Majority			2,152	13.4	+10.2
Turnout			16,162	62.2	−18.5
	Unionist hold		Swing	+5.1	
C indicates candidate endorsed by the coalition government.

=== Elections in the 1920s ===
Maxwell Thornton

General election 1922: Tavistock
Party	Candidate	Votes	%	±%
Liberal	Maxwell Thornton	11,708	54.5	+11.2
Unionist	Charles Williams	9,757	45.5	−11.2
Majority		1,951	9.0	N/A
Turnout		21,465	77.6	+14.4
Liberal gain from Unionist		Swing		

General election 1923: Tavistock
Party	Candidate	Votes	%	±%
Liberal	Maxwell Thornton	11,883	54.1	−0.4
Unionist	Philip Kenyon-Slaney	10,072	45.9	+0.4
Majority		1,811	8.2	−0.8
Turnout		21,955	77.7	+0.1
Liberal hold		Swing	-0.4	

1924 general election: Tavistock
Party	Candidate	Votes	%	±%
Unionist	Philip Kenyon-Slaney	12,058	52.8	+6.9
Liberal	Maxwell Thornton	10,786	47.2	−6.9
Majority		1,272	5.6	N/A
Turnout		22,844	77.7	0.0
Unionist gain from Liberal		Swing		

1928 Tavistock by-election
Party	Candidate	Votes	%	±%
Unionist	Wallace Wright	10,745	45.2	−7.6
Liberal	Reginald Fletcher	10,572	44.5	−2.7
Labour	Richard Davies	2,449	10.3	New
Majority		173	0.7	−4.9
Turnout		21,317	77.3	−4.4
Unionist hold		Swing	-2.5	

1929 general election: Tavistock
Party	Candidate	Votes	%	±%
Unionist	Wallace Wright	14,192	44.7	−0.5
Liberal	Hilda Runciman	14,040	44.1	−0.4
Labour	Richard Davies	3,574	11.2	+0.9
Majority		152	0.6	−0.1
Turnout		31,716		
Unionist hold		Swing		

=== Elections in the 1930s ===
General election 1931: Tavistock
Party	Candidate	Votes	%	±%
Conservative	Colin Patrick	17,310	52.4	+7.7
Liberal	John Adam Day	13,592	41.2	−2.9
Labour	Richard Davies	2,124	6.4	−4.8
Majority		3,718	11.2	+10.6
Turnout		33,026	83.3	
Conservative hold		Swing		

General election 1935: Tavistock
Party	Candidate	Votes	%	±%
Conservative	Colin Patrick	17,475	52.8	+0.4
Liberal	John Adam Day	13,422	40.5	−0.7
Labour	Charles Henry Townsend	2,236	6.7	+0.3
Majority		4,053	12.3	+1.1
Turnout		33,133	77.9	−3.4
Conservative hold		Swing		

=== Elections in the 1940s ===
General Election 1939–40:

Another General Election was required to take place before the end of 1940. The political parties had been making preparations for an election to take place from 1939 and by the end of this year, the following candidates had been selected;

- Conservative: Colin Patrick
- Liberal: Frank Milton
- Labour: J Finnigan

1942 Tavistock by-election
Party	Candidate	Votes	%	±%
Conservative	Henry Studholme	Unopposed	N/A	N/A
Conservative hold		Swing		

1945 general election: Tavistock
Party	Candidate	Votes	%	±%
Conservative	Henry Studholme	19,730	46.9	−5.9
Liberal	Isaac Foot	13,764	32.8	−7.7
Labour	James Finnigan	8,539	20.3	+13.6
Majority		5,966	14.1	+1.8
Turnout		42,033	75.8	−2.1
Conservative hold		Swing		

=== Elections in the 1950s ===
General election 1950: Tavistock
Party	Candidate	Votes	%	±%
Conservative	Henry Studholme	18,682	50.3	+3.4
Labour	Frank W Harcourt-Munning	10,189	27.4	+7.1
Liberal	JD Wyatt	8,281	22.3	+10.5
Majority		8,493	22.9	+8.8
Turnout		37,152	84.7	+8.9
Conservative hold		Swing		

General election 1951: Tavistock
Party	Candidate	Votes	%	±%
Conservative	Henry Studholme	22,683	63.87	
Labour	Frank W Harcourt-Munning	12,833	36.13	
Majority		9,850	27.8	+4.9
Turnout		35,516	78.8	−5.9
Conservative hold		Swing		

General election 1955: Tavistock
Party	Candidate	Votes	%	±%
Conservative	Henry Studholme	18,991	54.8	−9.1
Labour	Harold Lawrance	8,755	25.2	−10.9
Liberal	Richard Moore	6,937	20.0	New
Majority		10,236	29.6	+1.8
Turnout		34,683	76.9	−1.9
Conservative hold		Swing		

General election 1959: Tavistock
Party	Candidate	Votes	%	±%
Conservative	Henry Studholme	19,778	53.7	−1.1
Liberal	Richard Moore	9,008	24.5	+4.5
Labour	Bryan R Weston	8,022	21.8	−3.4
Majority		10,770	29.2	−0.4
Turnout		36,808	78.5	+1.6
Conservative hold		Swing		

=== Elections in the 1960s ===
General election 1964: Tavistock
Party	Candidate	Votes	%	±%
Conservative	Henry Studholme	19,493	47.8	−5.9
Liberal	Grenville Jones	14,093	34.5	+10.0
Labour	John A Elswood	7,226	17.7	−4.1
Majority		5,400	13.2	−16.0
Turnout		40,812		
Conservative hold		Swing		

General election 1966: Tavistock
Party	Candidate	Votes	%	±%
Conservative	Michael Heseltine	21,644	49.2	+1.4
Liberal	Christopher Trethewey	13,461	30.6	−3.9
Labour	Peggy Middleton	8,902	20.2	+2.5
Majority		8,183	18.6	+5.4
Turnout		44,007	81.4	
Conservative hold		Swing		

=== Elections in the 1970s ===
General election 1970: Tavistock
Party	Candidate	Votes	%	±%
Conservative	Michael Heseltine	25,846	57.1	+7.9
Liberal	Michael E B Banks	10,397	23.0	−7.6
Labour	Harold M Luscombe	8,982	19.9	−0.3
Majority		15,449	34.1	+15.5
Turnout		45,225		
Conservative hold		Swing		
