= Frederick Teschemaker =

New Zealand politician (1834–1878)

New Zealand Parliament
Years	Term	Electorate	Party
1876–1878	6th	Gladstone	Independent

Frederick William Teschemaker (1834 – 21 November 1878) was a 19th-century Member of Parliament in Canterbury, New Zealand.

He represented the Gladstone electorate from 1876 to 1878, when he died.

New Zealand Parliament
Preceded by George Parker	Member of Parliament for Gladstone; 1876–1878	Succeeded by John Studholme
