= William Honychurch =

16th-century English politician

William Honychurch (by 1489 – 1530/1531), of Tavistock, Devon and London, was an English politician.

== Family ==
Honychurch was the son of Walter Honychurch of Tavistock and Marion née Fitz of Tavistock. He was educated at Lincoln's Inn. He married Emma Coles, daughter of John Coles of North Tawton, Devon. They had three sons and two daughters.

== Career ==
He was a Member (MP) of the Parliament of England for Tavistock in 1529.
