= Hugh Luttrell (Liberal politician) =

Hugh Luttrell

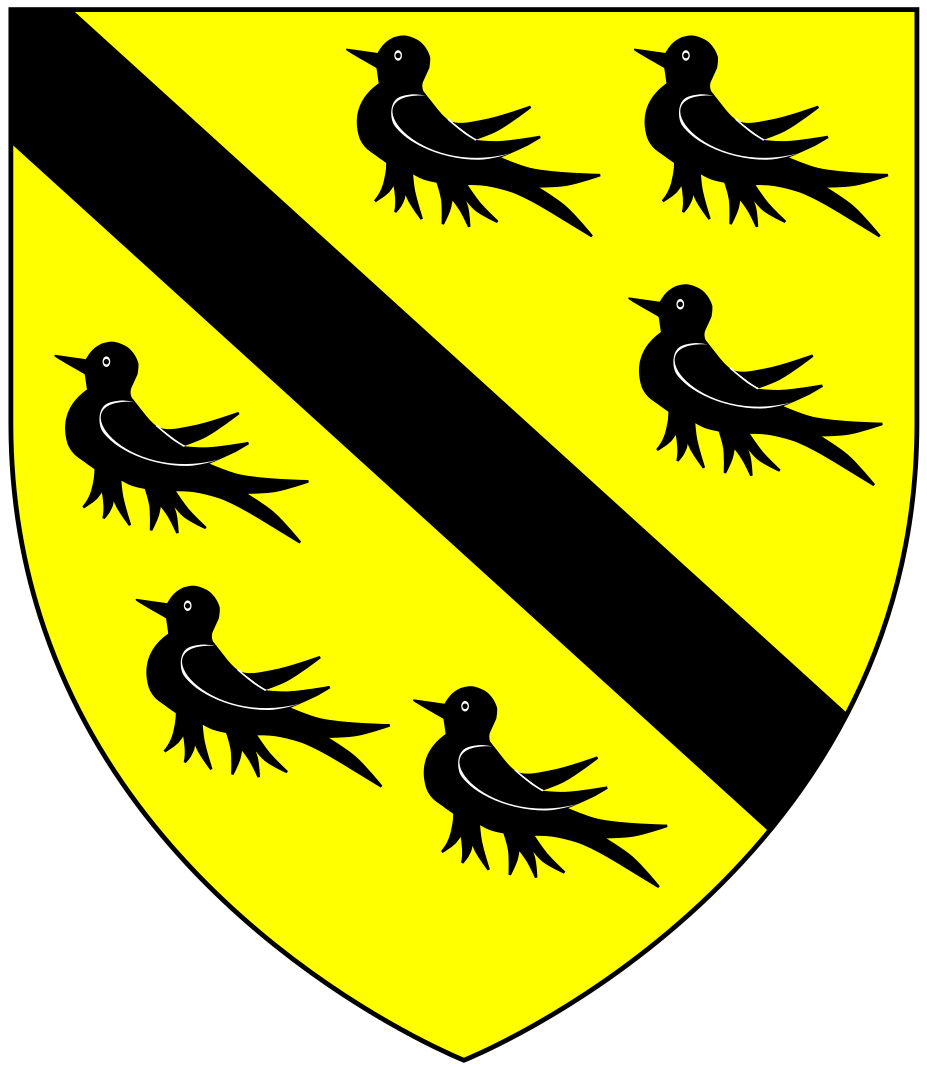
Arms of Luttrell: Or, a bend between six martlets sable

Hugh Courtenay Fownes Luttrell (10 February 1857 – 14 January 1918) was a British Liberal Party politician.

He was elected at the 1892 general election as Member of Parliament (MP) for the Tavistock division of Devon, regaining a seat where the Liberal MP Viscount Ebrington had joined the Liberal Unionists after his election in 1885. Luttrell's majority was a slender 2.5% of the votes, and although he increased it slightly in 1895, he did not contest the seat in 1900, on account of ill-health. The Liberal Unionist John Ward Spear won it with a majority of only 15 votes. Luttrell stood again at the 1906 general election and regained the seat by a wide margin, but his majority was cut in January 1910 and at the December 1910 general election Spear unseated him for a second time.

Parliament of the United Kingdom
Preceded by Viscount Ebrington	Member of Parliament for Tavistock; 1892–1900	Succeeded by John Spear
Preceded by John Spear	Member of Parliament for Tavistock; 1906 – December 1910	Succeeded by John Spear
