= Henry William Studholme =

British forester, businessman, and landowner

Sir Henry "Harry" William Studholme, 3rd Baronet, DL is a British forester, businessman and landowner. He is the chairman of the U.K. Forestry Commission, which manages the U.K.'s state-owned forests and is the country's largest land manager. He ran the U.K. government's Regional Development Agency 2009 – 2012.

In 2012, the Bishop of Liverpool James Jones and Studholme, as Chairman and Deputy Chairman respectively, conducted the Independent Forestry Panel report on the future of the UK’s state-owned forests after the government announced plans to sell off the British state forests.

In 2017, he was appointed as an honorary professor of the College of Social Sciences and International Studies at the University of Exeter researching the forestry in the British Isles, and the impact of tree disease.

== Early life and education ==
He was born in Exeter, Devon in 1958 as the son of Capt. Sir Paul Henry William Studholme, 2nd Bart. He was educated at Eton College and subsequently Trinity Hall, Cambridge with an MA in Engineering. He then became a chartered accountant (FCA) in London before working as an accountant and subsequently in manufacturing in the North of England.

== Career ==
He ran the United Kingdom’s South West Regional Development Agency (South West RDA) from 2009 to 2012. During this time, the South West RDA helped bring projects including Wave Hub, the Eden Project and Osprey Quay to fruition. Through the RDA, he was also involved in the Airbus ‘Integrated Wing’ project, which generated over 850 high-skilled jobs and £40 million added-value to the economy, and the Combined Universities in Cornwall project. He oversaw the dissolution of the UK’s regional development agencies from 2012 to 2013.

He also chaired the Finding Sanctuary project, working with environmentalists and the UK’s fishing industry on proposals for marine conservation from 2007 to 2011. He became a forestry commissioner of Great Britain in 2007.

He previously ran a large publicly-quoted private timber company that owns and manages forests worldwide

== Personal life ==
He lives at Perridge House with his wife Lucy. They have three children. His brother James Studholme is the founder of production company Blink and plays in the band Police Dog Hogan.

Studholme was appointed a Deputy Lieutenant for Devon

Baronetage of the United Kingdom
Preceded by Paul Studholme	Baronet (of Perridge); 1990–present	Incumbent
