= Roger Baker (MP) =

15th-century English politician

Roger Baker (fl. 1406), was an English politician.

He was a member (MP) of the parliament of England for Tavistock in 1406.
