= William Studholme =

New Zealand cricketer (1864–1941)

Personal information
- Born: 23 April 1864; Te Waimate, New Zealand
- Died: 23 February 1941 (aged 76); Devon, England
- Source: Cricinfo, 20 October 2020

William Paul Studholme (23 April 1864 – 23 February 1941) was a New Zealand barrister and cricketer. He played in two first-class matches for Canterbury from 1887 to 1889.

He was the son of John Studholme of Christchurch. He matriculated at Magdalen College, Oxford in 1882, graduating B.A. in 1886. He was called to the bar at the Inner Temple in 1887.

== See also ==
- List of Canterbury representative cricketers
