= Paul Studholme =

Sir Paul Studholme Bt DL
- Born: Paul Henry William Studholme; 16 January 1930; London, England
- Died: 31 January 1990 (aged 60); Exeter, England
- Spouse: Virginia Katherine Palmer (m. 1957)
- Children: Henry William Studholme; James Paul Gilfred Studholme; Anna Katherine Studholme
- Relatives: Henry Studholme (father)
- Military career
- Service years: 1950–1959
- Rank: Captain
- Unit: Coldstream Guards

Captain Sir Paul Henry William Studholme, 2nd Baronet (16 January 1930 – 31 January 1990) was a British Army officer and landowner.

== Life ==
Studholme was born in Paddington, London in 1930, the son of Sir Henry Gray Studholme, 1st Bt. and Judith Joan Mary Whitbread. He was educated at Eton College and Royal Military Academy Sandhurst. He was stationed in Libya, Egypt, Germany, and Jordan during his service with the Coldstream Guards from 1950 to 1959.

Afterward, Studholme was a director with the TSB Group and chaired its regional board for the South West.

He married Virginia Katherine Palmer, daughter of Sir Richmond Palmer, on 2 March 1957. He died in Exeter in 1990, aged 60, and was succeeded in the baronetcy by his son Henry William Studholme, 3rd Bt.

He was High Sheriff of Devon in 1988.

== See also ==
- Studholme baronets

Baronetage of the United Kingdom
Preceded by Henry Gray Studholme	Baronet (of Perridge); 1987–1990	Succeeded by Henry William Studholme
