= 1958 Torrington by-election =

UK parliamentary by-election

The 1958 Torrington by-election, in Devon, England, was the first gain by the British Liberal Party at a by-election since Holland with Boston in 1929.

== Background ==
The election was caused by the accession of George Lambert, National Liberal and Conservative Member of Parliament for Torrington to a hereditary peerage as Viscount Lambert. He had held the constituency since its creation in 1950, with large majorities over Labour Party candidates. The Liberal Party had only contested the seat in 1950, although they then came second, with 25% of the vote. Lambert's father, also George Lambert, had held the predecessor seat of South Molton for much of its history, initially as a Liberal, but then as a National Liberal.

Although generally popular, the Conservative administration of Harold Macmillan had been hit by differences over economic policy, and in January 1958, all the Government's Treasury Ministers had resigned.

The Liberal Party had reached its lowest ebb in the 1951 general election, winning just 2.5% of the vote nationally, and gaining only six MPs. They had been reduced to five seats when they lost the 1957 Carmarthen by-election, but their fortunes had shown signs of a revival when they came a close second in North Dorset later in the year, and Rochdale early in 1958.

The Conservatives selected Anthony Royle, President of the Western Area Young Conservatives, a London-based insurance broker who had unsuccessfully contested St Pancras North in the 1955 general election. The Liberals chose Mark Bonham Carter, a publisher and advisor (and brother-in-law) to Jo Grimond who had unsuccessfully stood in Barnstaple in the 1945 election. Labour stood Leonard Lamb, who had been their candidate in Torrington in 1955.

== Campaign ==
The by-election was held on 27 March 1958. Following Granada Television's screening of the Rochdale by-election earlier in the year, BBC Television chose Torrington for their second recorded election broadcast (after the 1955 general election). When the votes were counted, Bonham-Carter won a surprise victory, by just 219 votes – their first by-election victory since Middlesbrough West in 1945, and that achieved due to the war-time electoral pact. The Conservatives were beaten into second place, while Labour also lost votes and finished third.

For the Liberals there was a somewhat ironic situation. The previous year they had lost a seat to Lloyd George's daughter. Now they had gained a seat with Asquith's grandson.

== Result ==
Torrington by-election, 1958
Party	Candidate	Votes	%	±%
Liberal	Mark Bonham Carter	13,408	37.99	New
Conservative	Anthony Royle	13,189	37.37	−27.68
Labour	Leonard Lamb	8,697	24.64	−10.31
Majority		219	0.62	N/A
Turnout		35,294		
Liberal gain from National Liberal		Swing		

== Aftermath ==
Bonham-Carter lost the seat less than eighteen months later, in the 1959 general election, and failed to retake it when he stood again in 1964. In 1959, Royle chose to fight Richmond instead, winning a seat in the Commons. The Torrington by-election proved the first Liberal success in a long revival which continued with the 1962 Orpington by-election.

== Previous election ==
General election 1955: Torrington
Party	Candidate	Votes	%	±%
National Liberal	George Lambert	20,124	65.05	−1.18
Labour	Leonard Lamb	10,812	34.95	+1.18
Majority		9,312	30.10	−2.36
Turnout		30,936	69.20	−7.20
National Liberal hold		Swing		
