= Percy Browne =

British politician

Percy Basil Browne (2 May 1923 – 5 March 2004) was an English businessman, farmer, amateur jockey and Conservative Party politician. He was Member of Parliament for Torrington from 1959 to 1964.

He was educated at Eton before joining the army in 1941, and fought in North Africa, Sicily and Italy before joining the D-Day landings in Normandy in 1944, reaching the rank of Lieutenant in the Royal Armoured Corps. After the war he took up farming in Devon with his first wife, Pamela Exham, who died after a hunting accident.

After his wife's death, Browne moved to Dorset where he took up steeplechasing, and rode in the 1953 Grand National. He then remarried and moved to Gloucestershire, where he bought and ran a coal merchant's business. He later married for a third time and moved to Wiltshire, where he died in 2004.

== Career ==
Browne was selected by the Conservative party to fight the 1959 general election in the Labour-held Gloucester constituency, but was persuaded to stand instead in Torrington, which had been won the Liberal Mark Bonham Carter in a by-election in 1958. The defeated Conservative candidate at the by-election had been Anthony Royle, whose failure had been attributed partly to being perceived as a City businessman, and the party wanted a local candidate.

Browne agreed to stand on condition that he did have to undergo the usual process of appearing before a selection committee. In a year of Liberal gains, he retook the seat with a majority of 2,265.

He served in Parliament for only one term, in which he developed a reputation as an independent-minded politician. He refused the offer of a post as Parliamentary Private Secretary because it would have restrained his freedom to criticise the Conservative government, and in Who's Who he listed "whip-baiting" as one of his hobbies. He stood down at the 1964 general election.

After leaving the House of Commons, he undertook various business ventures (including the chairmanship of Appledore Shipbuilders) and accepted several public appointments, including serving as commissioner of the National Parks. He was a Deputy Lieutenant of Devon from 1984 until his death and High Sheriff of Devon in 1978.

Parliament of the United Kingdom
Preceded by Mark Bonham Carter	Member of Parliament for Torrington; 1959–1964	Succeeded by Peter Mills
