= Charles Martin Hardie =

Scottish artist and portrait painter

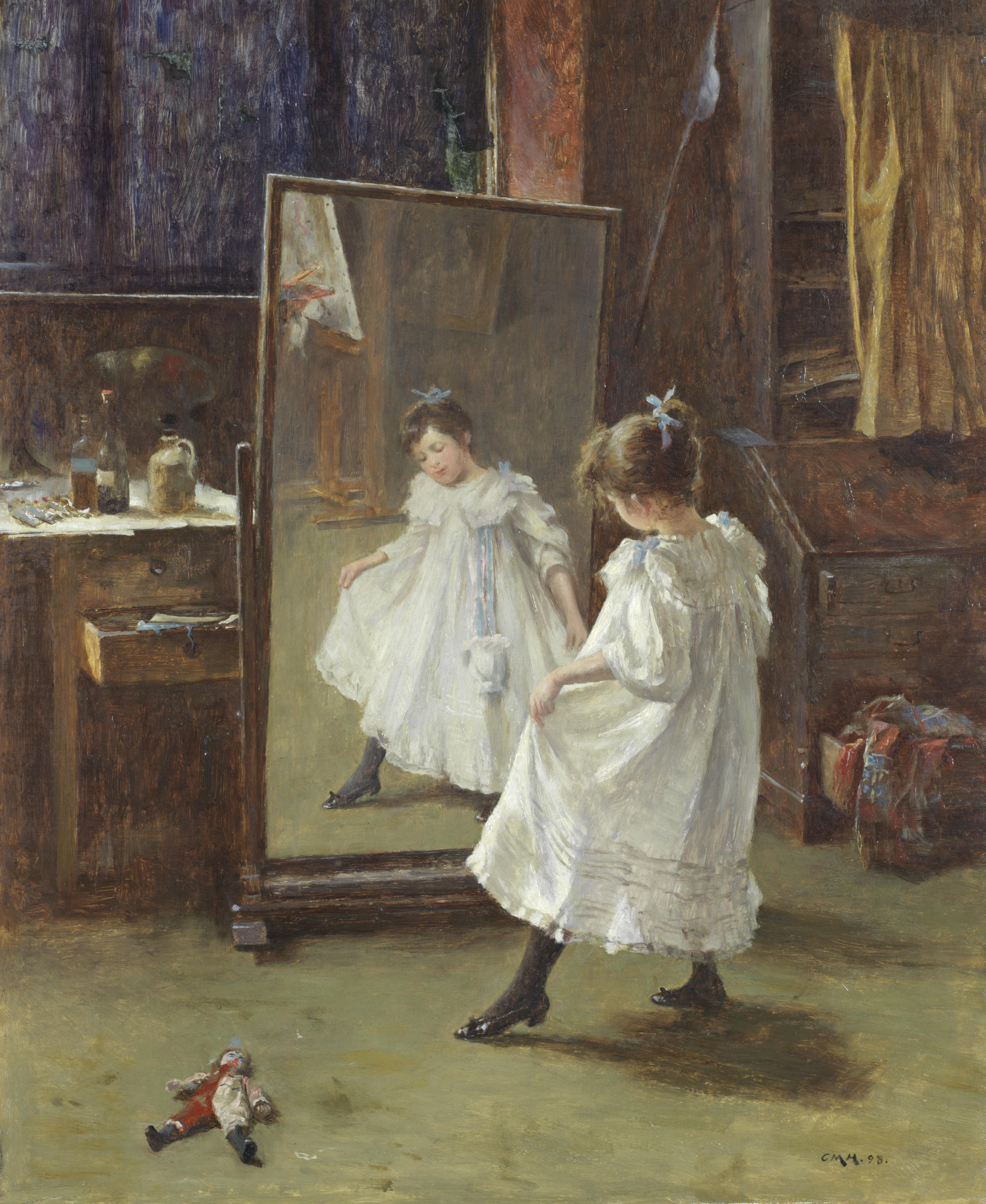
'The Studio Mirror' by Charles Martin Hardie

Charles Martin Hardie (16 March 1858 – 3 September 1916) was a Scottish artist and portrait painter.

Born in East Linton in East Lothian in Scotland, the son of Mary née Martin (1817–1901) and John Hardie (1820–1870), a Master Carpenter, Charles Martin Hardie initially joined the family business working as a carpenter; however, being related by marriage to the artist John Pettie persuaded him to train as an artist at the Trustees' Academy in Edinburgh. Throughout his career he specialised in portraits of Robert Burns and Sir Walter Scott in imaginary historical scenes and in paintings of Scottish country life which frequently have a strong narrative theme. Working in oils and watercolour, Hardie painted portraits, landscapes and genre and historical scenes. He maintained a studio in Picardy Place in Edinburgh.

In about 1889 he married Mary née Lewis (1871–1898) and with her had two children: Lewis Hardie (1890–1891) and Constance Valerie Martin Hardie (1892–1977). He divorced her in 1895 after she ran off with an actor following which he married Margaret Somerville née Smart (1873–).

Hardie was elected an Associate of the Royal Scottish Academy (ARSA) in 1886 and a member of the Royal Scottish Academy (RSA) in 1895. He exhibited at: the Royal Academy; the Royal Scottish Academy; the Royal Hibernian Academy; the Royal Institute of Painters in Water Colours; the Royal Glasgow Institute of Fine Arts and the Aberdeen Artists’ Society.

At least eight of his artworks are in the collection of the National Galleries of Scotland His portrait of Julius Drewe hangs in Castle Drogo in Devon.

Charles Martin Hardie died in Edinburgh in 1916 aged 58.
