= Viscount Lambert =

Extinct viscountcy in the Peerage of the United Kingdom

Viscount Lambert, of South Molton in the County of Devon, was a title in the Peerage of the United Kingdom. It was created in 1945 for George Lambert, who had been a Liberal Member of Parliament since 1891, with the exception for the 1924-1929 Parliament. He was succeeded by his eldest son, the second Viscount. He had succeeded his father as Member of Parliament for South Molton in 1945, and later represented Torrington in Parliament. On his death the title passed to his younger brother, the third Viscount. The title became extinct on his death in 1999.

== Viscounts Lambert (1945) ==
- George Lambert, 1st Viscount Lambert (1866–1958)
- George Lambert, 2nd Viscount Lambert (1909–1989)
- Michael John Lambert, 3rd Viscount Lambert (1912–1999)

== Arms ==
Coat of arms of Viscount Lambert
| Crest Issuant from a mount Vert an apple tree fructed Proper. Escutcheon Azure a chevron Or fretty of the first between in chief two Garbs and in base a fleece of the second. Supporters On either side a Cornish chough Proper collared Or. Motto The Good Earth Provides |
