= Geoffrey Cox (British politician) =

British politician (born 1960)

The Right Honourable Sir Geoffrey Cox KC MP
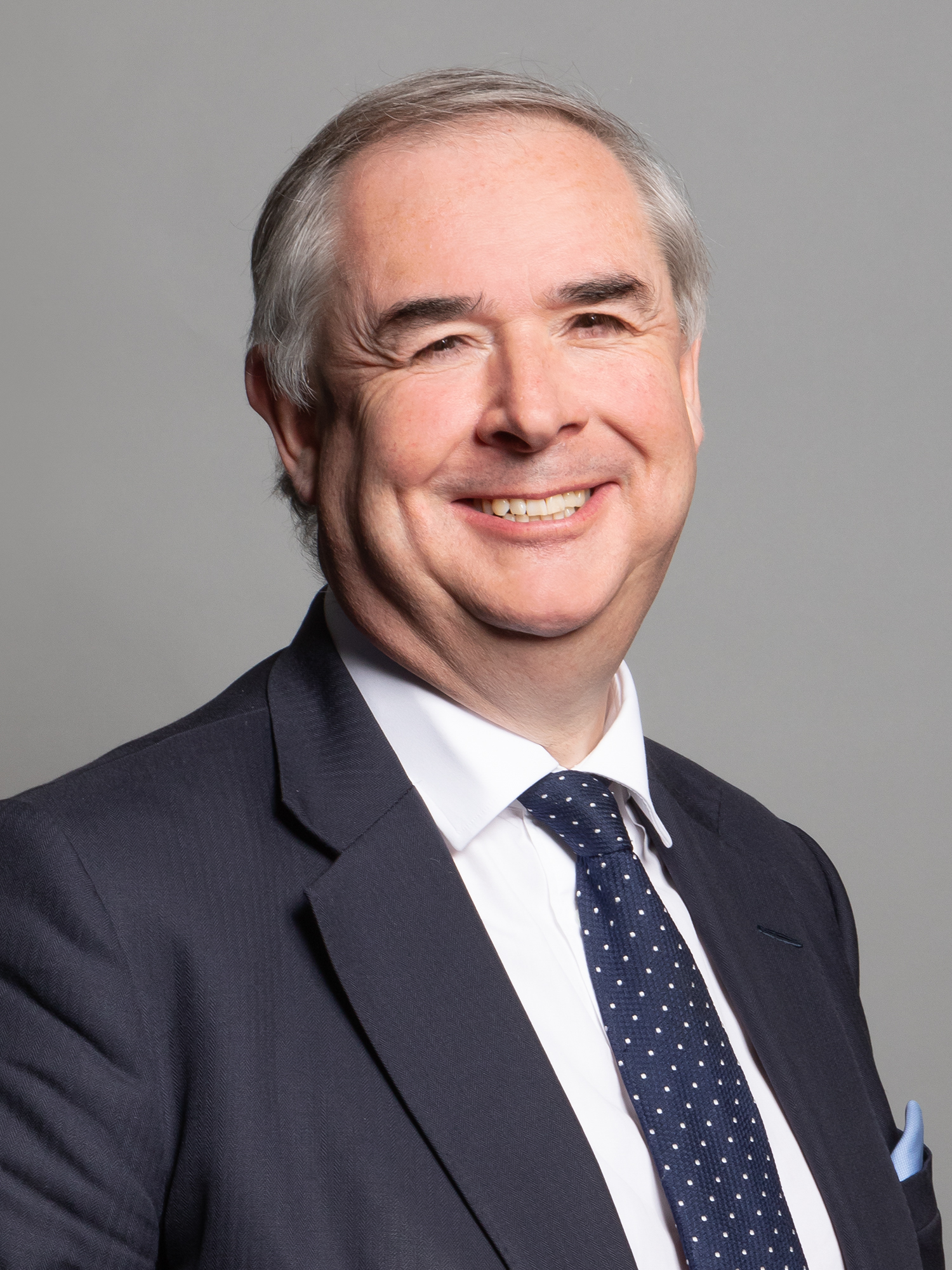
- Official portrait, 2020

Attorney General for England and Wales Advocate General for Northern Ireland
- In office 9 July 2018 – 13 February 2020
- Prime Minister: Theresa May; Boris Johnson
- Preceded by: Jeremy Wright
- Succeeded by: Suella Braverman

Member of Parliament for Torridge and Tavistock Torridge and West Devon (2005–2024)
- Incumbent
- Assumed office 5 May 2005
- Preceded by: John Burnett
- Majority: 3,950 (7.8%)

Personal details
- Born: Charles Geoffrey Cox; 30 April 1960 (age 66) Wroughton, Wiltshire, England
- Party: Conservative
- Spouse: Jeanie MacDonald (m. 1985)
- Children: 3
- Education: Downing College, Cambridge
- Website: www.geoffreycox.co.uk

Sir Charles Geoffrey Cox (born 30 April 1960) is a British Conservative Party politician and barrister. He has been the member of parliament (MP) for Torridge and Tavistock, previously Torridge and West Devon, since 2005. Cox worked as a barrister from 1982 onwards and was appointed a Queen's Counsel in 2003, two years before his election to Parliament. He served as Attorney General for England and Wales and Advocate General for Northern Ireland under Theresa May and Boris Johnson from 2018 to 2020.

In January 2023 it was reported that Cox had, since the 2019 general election, earned more than £2 million in addition to his salary as an MP – the second-highest amount of any MP, with only former prime minister Theresa May having earned more.

== Early life and education ==
Charles Geoffrey Cox was born on 30 April 1960 in Wroughton, Wiltshire to Michael, a Royal Artillery Officer, and Diane. He was educated at King's College, Taunton, a private school, before reading law and classics at Downing College, Cambridge.

== Legal career ==
Cox was called to the Bar at the Middle Temple in 1982, and started practice as a barrister. In 1992 he co-founded Thomas More Chambers, as its Head of Chambers. He was appointed as a Queen's Counsel in 2003.

For part of his career as a barrister, Cox was Standing Counsel to the government of Mauritius. His cases have included "civil fraud and asset recovery, commercial, human rights, defamation, and judicial review actions". He has appeared as leading counsel in the Supreme Court and the Privy Council, and he was instructed to lead in commercial actions and arbitrations overseas, appearing in the DIFC, Mauritius, and the Cayman Islands.

His criminal cases have included the Jubilee line corruption trial and successfully defending a member of the Queen's Lancashire Regiment who had been accused of war crimes related to the death of Baha Mousa.

In 2014, Cox successfully defended the former Premier (and later Speaker of the Legislative Assembly) of the Cayman Islands, McKeeva Bush, on charges of corruption and misuse of office. In March 2015, Cox successfully defended the deputy Editor of The Sun, Geoff Webster, in a trial of four journalists resulting from Operation Elveden. The jury had to decide at what point the behaviour of those on trial could be considered a criminal rather than a serious disciplinary matter; which lawyers involved in the case struggled to define. Cox subsequently publicly criticised the vagueness of the law, and its disproportionate use that had led to the prosecution.

== Parliamentary career ==
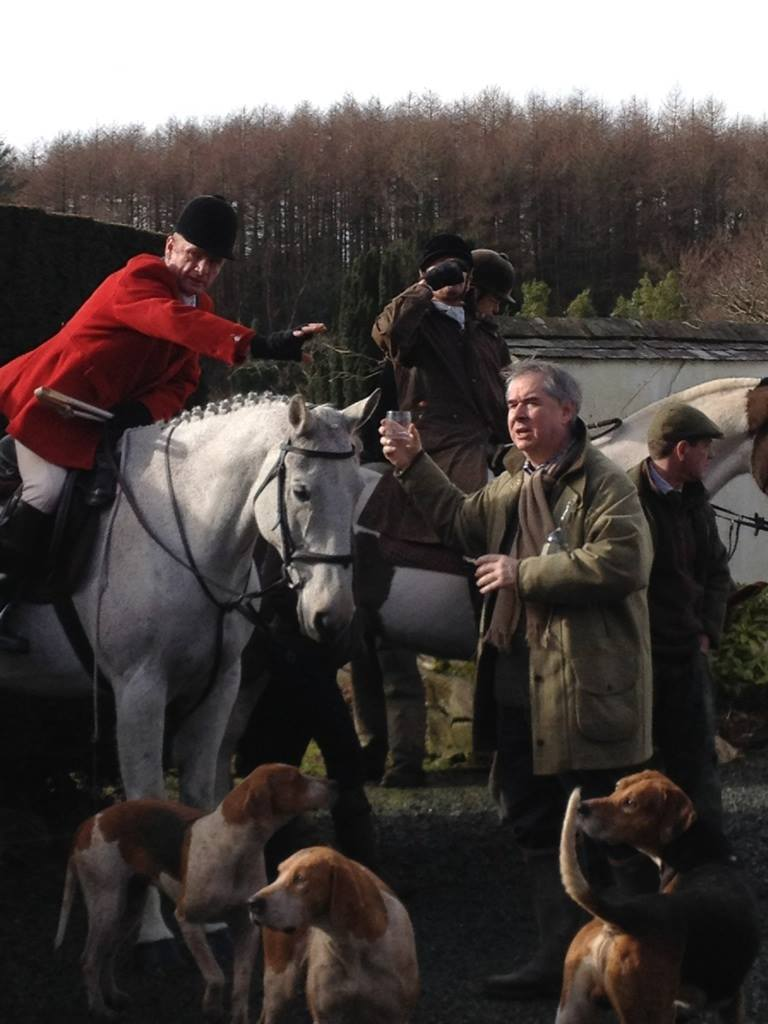
Cox hosting a lawn meet of the Lamerton Foxhounds, 2014

Cox was first selected to stand for Parliament in 2000 by the Torridge and West Devon Conservatives. In the following 2001 general election, he came second to incumbent Liberal Democrat John Burnett by 1,194 votes.

After the 2001 election, Cox was reselected. Burnett announced in 2003 that he would not contest the seat again, and at the 2005 general election Cox defeated the new Liberal Democrat candidate, David Walter, gaining a majority of 3,236. Cox made his maiden speech in the House of Commons on 28 June 2005.

Cox was re-elected as MP for Torridge and West Devon at the 2010 general election with a slightly decreased majority of 2,957 votes (5.4%).

At the 2015 general election, Cox was re-elected with an increased majority of 18,403 votes (32.5%).

In January 2016, it was reported he had a number of office expense claims for items, such as a 49 pence pint of milk, rejected by the Commons authorities. In response, Cox said that his staff had been unaware of a recent change in the rules for office expenses, which no longer permitted office hospitality items such as tea, coffee or milk to be claimed.

In February 2016, Cox told the House of Commons that he had concluded, after examining the published renegotiation proposals, that the case for leaving the EU was now overwhelming and that he would vote to do so in the forthcoming referendum.

Cox was again re-elected at the snap 2017 election, with his majority increasing to 20,686 (34.7%).

In the House of Commons he has sat on the Environment, Food and Rural Affairs Select committee, the Committee on Standards and the Committee on Privileges. Cox resigned from the latter role in 2016 after registering more than £400,000 of outside earnings within the time limit.

On 9 July 2018, Cox was appointed to the Cabinet as Her Majesty's Attorney General for England and Wales and Advocate General for Northern Ireland.

In the 2019 general election, Cox was re-elected with 60.1% of the vote and a majority of 24,992 (41.8%), which was reduced to 31.6% of the vote, majority 3,950 in 2024.

=== Attorney General ===
On 9 July 2018, Theresa May appointed Cox as attorney general taking over from Jeremy Wright following a Cabinet reshuffle, prompted by the resignations of David Davis and Boris Johnson. Two days later on 11 July, Cox was sworn in as a member of Her Majesty's Most Honourable Privy Council.

On 1 December 2018, The Sunday Times newspaper reported the leaked contents of a recent letter written by Cox to Cabinet Ministers detailing the Attorney General's legal advice on Theresa May's Brexit deal. The newspaper reported that his legal advice declared the Withdrawal agreement's backstop protocol would mean the UK being indefinitely locked into a customs union with the EU if future negotiations collapse and that the only way the UK could leave the Backstop would be the signing of a future trade deal which could take many years to complete. The former Brexit Secretary Dominic Raab and three serving Cabinet members confirmed the contents of the letter to the Sunday Times.

In February 2019, Theresa May placed Cox in charge of negotiating changes to the Northern Ireland backstop in the EU withdrawal agreement.

On 24 September 2019, the Supreme Court of the United Kingdom ruled unanimously that Prime Minister Boris Johnson's prorogation of parliament was unlawful, overturning the High Court's judgment, given by the Lord Chief Justice, in the government's favour. On the same day, minutes of a conference call between cabinet ministers (which included Cox) were leaked to Sky News. The minutes of the call, which took place after the prorogation had been approved by the Queen, detailed that Cox briefly told the cabinet at that time that in his view the prorogation was lawful and constitutional and that any accusations of unlawfulness "were motivated by political considerations". Cox's full advice to the Government has not been published, as per precedent to protect government legal advice being prone to influence. The next day Cox appeared in the House of Commons to answer an urgent question on the Government's legal advice and on the implications of the Supreme Court's decision. Cox rebutted calls for him to resign and criticisms of the Government's position, stating that senior and distinguished judges had agreed with the Government's view that the issue was not justiciable and chiding MPs for refusing to agree to a means of the UK leaving the EU while repeatedly preventing the House of Commons from dissolving for an election.

In February 2020, Cox said the public is concerned about the creeping "judicialisation of politics" and said people were right to worry that unelected officials were making decisions that ought to be taken by Parliament. He promised there would not be radical reforms. He stated his opposition to the highly politicised US selection process of Supreme Court and suggested he preferred the Canadian system. Cox said that "there's a case for looking at how supreme court judges are appointed... There's a committee of the Canadian parliament that carries out interviews [of candidates]."

On 13 February 2020, in a Cabinet reshuffle, Cox was dismissed as attorney general, at the request of the prime minister, Boris Johnson, and replaced by Suella Braverman.

He was knighted in the 2021 New Year Honours for parliamentary and political service.

== Other work whilst an MP ==
Cox has continued to practise as a King's Counsel (KC) whilst an MP. According to The Daily Telegraph, based on the declarations in the Register of Members' Interests, Cox's extra-parliamentary work was worth £820,867 in 2014, while the total time on extra-parliamentary work that was registered in 2014 (although the register shows the hours were worked over 3 years) was 1,954 hours.

Cox has previously defended his outside work, pointing out that MPs of all parties have practised as KCs over the years, and that the attorney general and solicitor general are normally chosen from their ranks. He has argued that he has always been used to long hours, that 70 and 80 hour weeks are normal at the Bar, and that the Nolan report concluded that Parliament needed people with current experience of a wide range of professional and other backgrounds.

In 2016, the House of Commons Standards Committee—of which he was a member—found that he had committed a serious breach of a House of Commons rule, designed to make transparent an MP's financial interests, after failing to register £400k of outside earnings (11 payments) for legal work within the permitted 28-day period. Cox registered the payments late, between two and seven months after the deadline; he said that he had omitted to prioritise the rule in the midst of an intense political and professional schedule. When first registering the payments, in September 2015, Cox apologised to the Registrar for his omission, referring himself to the Parliamentary Commissioner, and stepped down from the committee. The Commissioner and the Committee accepted that the payments had not in fact given rise to any conflicts of interest and that the failure to register the payments within 28 days had thus had no practical effect. Alistair Graham, the former chairman of the Committee on Standards in Public Life, criticised the lack of punishment and called for a complete reform, while Martin Bell said the Committee on Standards had a long history of inflicting light punishment, which showed that the House was incapable of regulating itself.

On 9 July 2018, Cox gave up all private practice upon his appointment as attorney general, but resumed sometime after being sacked in February 2020, working as "consultant global counsel" to the international law firm Withers LLP. He earned "£468,000 a year for 48 hours of work per month" including over £150,000 for advising the government of the British Virgin Islands about alleged corruption in a case brought by the Foreign Office. Beginning on 26 April 2021, Cox spent one month in the Caribbean and with the permission of the chief whip, continued to vote in Parliament via proxy due to the coronavirus lockdown.

In January 2023, Sky News said that Cox had, since the 2019 general election, earnt more than £2 million in addition to his salary as an MP – the second-highest amount of any MP, with only former prime minister Theresa May having earnt more.

In August 2025, Cox started representing West Cumbria Mining (Holdings) Ltd. and its investors in a dispute against the British government, for the cancellation of the Woodhouse Colliery project.

=== Attorney for suspect in tax fraud case ===
On 10 December 2019, Danish media claimed that Cox had earned £380,000 (3.4 million DKK) in legal fees during the years 2015–2017 for representing Sanjay Shah, a Dubai-based British businessman and prime suspect in what is reported to have been the largest tax fraud case Denmark had ever seen. Shah and his legal team said that he only exploited legal loopholes which Denmark had failed to close.

Preben Bang Henriksen, chairman of the legal affairs committee of the Danish Parliament, claimed that Cox's engagement for Shah posed a conflict of interest or disqualification issue because the Danish investigation is dependent on British assistance. Henriksen feared that the ties between Shah and Cox "might discourage British authorities from investigating the case as thoroughly as it evidently needed to be". A spokesman for Cox rejected that Cox had influenced the investigation in Britain or Denmark, since a system at the Attorney General office would prevent conflicts of interest because Cox would not take part in any decisions within cases where he had previously been involved as a lawyer.

== Personal life ==
Cox lives in rural West Devon, near Tavistock, and London. As with the majority of MPs who do not represent a constituency close to Parliament, he maintains accommodation on expenses in London for when he is working there. He married Jeanie MacDonald in 1985 and they have one daughter and two sons.

=== Tax avoidance claims ===
In September 2014, it was reported that Cox was one of a number of individuals, including Wayne Rooney, Guy Ritchie, and Jeremy Paxman, investing in the Phoenix Film Partners LLC scheme run by Ingenious PLC, of which HM Revenue and Customs (HMRC) had said it believed it "was designed to avoid tax". A tribunal was to take place later in the year. Ingenious had replied that the scheme had been submitted to HMRC for pre-approval and that HMRC had not raised any objections. Cox said that his instructions to his financial advisers were that he did not wish to be involved in "aggressive tax avoidance", and the newspaper reported that there was "no suggestion that he has done anything illegal". Following a court victory against two sale and leaseback film partnerships, Proteus 1 and Samarkand 3, HMRC said it was contacting users of similar schemes, "encouraging them to settle their affairs". Ingenious Media commented: "HMRC has persistently failed to distinguish between commercial businesses and tax avoidance schemes, and without proper differentiation has deemed all film partnerships to be tax schemes."

Parliament of the United Kingdom
| Preceded by John Burnett | Member of Parliament for Torridge and West Devon; 2005–present | Incumbent |
Political offices
| Preceded by Jeremy Wright | Attorney General for England and Wales; 2018–2020 | Succeeded by Suella Braverman |
| Preceded by Jeremy Wright | Advocate General for Northern Ireland; 2018–2020 | Succeeded by Suella Braverman |
