= Cedric Drewe =

British politician (1896–1971)

Sir Cedric Drewe KCVO
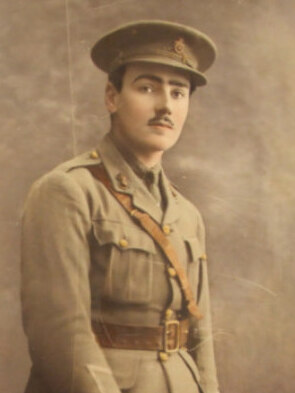

Treasurer of the Household
- In office 7 November 1951 – 13 June 1955
- Prime Minister: Winston Churchill; Anthony Eden
- Preceded by: Arthur Pearson
- Succeeded by: Tam Galbraith

Opposition Deputy Chief Whip of the House of Commons
- In office 4 July 1948 – 26 October 1951 Serving with Harry Mackeson (1950–1951)
- Leader: Winston Churchill
- Preceded by: Patrick Buchan-Hepburn
- Succeeded by: Robert Taylor

Member of Parliament for Honiton
- In office 27 October 1931 – 6 May 1955
- Preceded by: Clive Morrison-Bell
- Succeeded by: Robert Mathew

Member of Parliament for South Molton
- In office 29 October 1924 – 10 May 1929
- Preceded by: George Lambert
- Succeeded by: George Lambert

Personal details
- Born: Cedric Drewe; 26 May 1896 Culverden Castle, Royal Tunbridge Wells, Kent, UK
- Died: 21 January 1971 (aged 74) Broadhembury, Devon, UK
- Party: Conservative
- Spouse: Beatrice Newington (m. 1918)
- Children: Walter; Alwyn; Margaret; Francis
- Parent(s): Julius Drewe; Frances Drewe
- Education: Eton College

Sir Cedric Drewe KCVO (26 May 1896 – 21 January 1971) was a British Conservative Party politician.

== Early life ==
He was the son of Julius Drewe, the English businessman, retailer, and entrepreneur.

== Political career ==
At the 1924 general election, he was elected to the House of Commons as Member of Parliament (MP) for South Molton in Devon, defeating the long-serving Liberal MP, George Lambert, who had held the seat since 1891. Lambert regained the seat at the next contest, the 1929 general election, and went on to represent South Molton until he retired from the Commons at the 1945 general election.

Drewe returned to Parliament two years later, at the 1931 general election, for the Honiton constituency. He held the seat until he retired from Parliament at the 1955 general election.

He never held ministerial office, but was a Conservative whip for many years, and in the Third Churchill ministry, he was the government's deputy chief whip, with the formal title of Treasurer of the Household.

== Personal life ==
Drewe was appointed into the Royal Victorian Order, as a Knight Commander, by Queen Elizabeth II, on 1 June 1953.

Parliament of the United Kingdom
Preceded by George Lambert	Member of Parliament for South Molton; 1924–1929	Succeeded by George Lambert
Preceded by Clive Morrison-Bell	Member of Parliament for Honiton; 1931–1955	Succeeded by Robert Mathew
Political offices
Preceded by Arthur Pearson	Treasurer of the Household; 1951–1955	Succeeded by Tam Galbraith
Party political offices
Preceded by Patrick Buchan-Hepburn	Conservative Deputy Chief Whip in the House of Commons; 1948–1951; Served alongside: Harry Mackeson (1950–1951)	Succeeded by Harry Mackeson
