= Julius Drewe =

English businessman, retailer and entrepreneur (1856 -1931)

Julius C Drewe
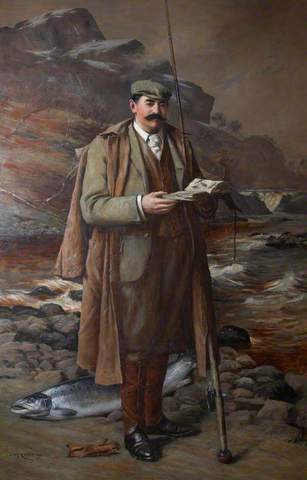
- Portrait of Julius Charles Drewe by Charles Martin Hardie (1902)
- Born: Julius Charles Drew; 4 April 1856; Pulloxhill near Ampthill, Bedfordshire
- Died: 10 November 1931 (aged 75); Drewsteignton, Devon
- Education: Bedford School
- Occupation: Tea merchant/trans-global businessman/entrepreneur
- Known for: Home and Colonial Stores
- Children: Adrian, Basil, Cedric, Mary and Frances

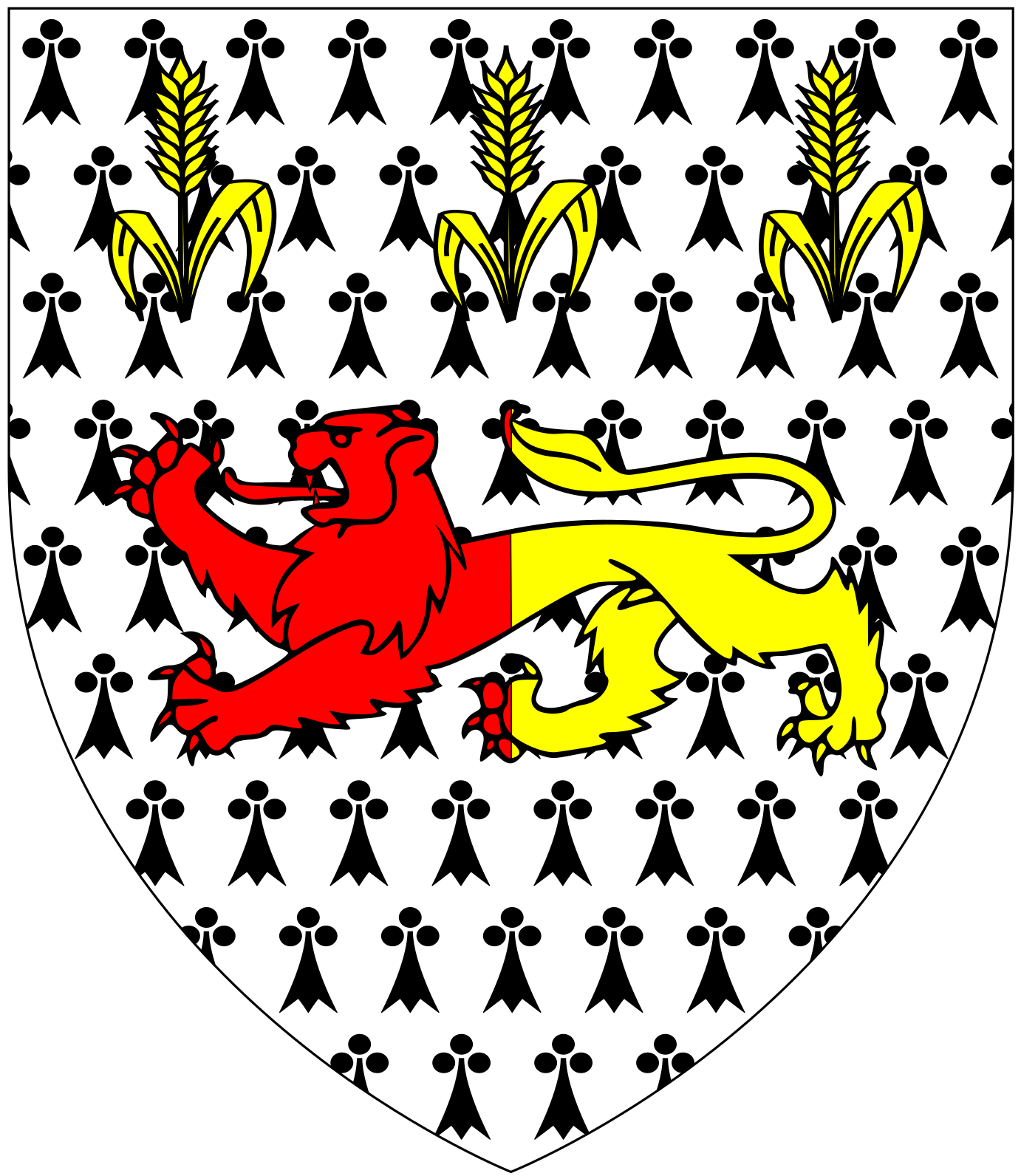
Arms of Drewe of Castle Drogo: Ermine, a lion passant per pale gules and or in chief three ears of wheat stalked and bladed of the last. This is a differenced version of the arms of Drewe of The Grange, Broadhembury (Ermine, a lion passant gules), from which family Julius Drewe claimed descent

Julius Charles Drewe (or Julius Drew; 4 April 1856 – 20 November 1931) was an English businessman, retailer and entrepreneur who founded Home and Colonial Stores, and who ordered the building of Castle Drogo in Devon.

== Origins ==
Julius Charles Drew (he changed the spelling to Drewe in 1913) was born at the vicarage in Pulloxhill near Ampthill in Bedfordshire, the son of Rev. George Smith Drew (1819–1880), Rector of Avington, Winchester, by his wife Mary Peek, the eldest child of William Peek of Loddiswell, Devon and first cousin of Sir Henry William Peek, 1st Baronet (1825–1898) of Rousdon, Devon. Julius was the third youngest of eight children. His siblings Mary, Edith, Ada, Reginald, William, Anna and Evelyn all moved, either to different parts of the United Kingdom or to the Colonies, including British North America. He was the nephew of Richard Peek, a Sheriff of the City of London.

=== Early origins ===
Julius' father, Rev. George Smith Drew, was born 22 October 1818 in Kensington, then a village on the outskirts of London, to an affluent family. He was a clergyman and serial publisher. Julius' mother was Mary Peek, born 13 March 1821 in Islington. Julius' grandfather, George H. Drew, was born in Belgravia, in Westminster in 1790 but at the age of four moved with his parents to their country house in the South Hams, Devonshire. George moved back to London aged twenty-one and became a tea merchant during the birth of the Industrial Revolution. The Drew family had close ties with the French aristocracy in the 18th century by the lineage of King Louis XIII through his great-granddaughter. As a result of this, Thomas Drew (Julius' great-grandfather) was born 1745 in Gironde, France. Thomas later migrated back to England with his father at a young age, at some time before the outbreak of the French Revolution of 1789, and became an architect based in Sloane Street, Westminster.

== Life ==
As a child he attended Bedford School between 1862 and 1874, a traditional private boarding school founded by King Edward VI. After leaving school at eighteen years of age, Julius started his working life as a tea buyer in China for his uncle Francis Peek (c.1836–99), a partner in Liverpool tea-merchants Peek and Winch. Julius’s great uncle, Richard Peek (1782–1867), one of the three brothers who founded Peek and Winch, was an abolitionist and philanthropist who was on the organising committee of the anti-slavery conventions held in London in 1840 and 1843. Julius opened his first tea shop four years later in Liverpool in 1878, aged only twenty-one. In 1883 Drewe and John Musker (1846–1926) founded the Home and Colonial Trading Association, which sold teas selected in India by Drewe, alongside other groceries. By 1903 the company had 500 stores. In 1883 he moved to London to expand his enterprises. The business developed rapidly under the name of Home and Colonial Stores. After only six years, in 1889, he and his partner, John Musker, were able to retire from active participation in the firm as extremely rich men. Drew was only thirty-two years old. In 1919 they sold their shares in the business for £3.5 million, then a huge sum (estimated at £193 million today).

In 1898 he bought Wadhurst Park in East Sussex.

== Genealogist ==
With his brother William he had always taken a keen interest in the history of the Drew family. A genealogist convinced him that his family was descended from the 16th century gentry family of Drewe of Sharpham, in the parish of Ashprington, near Totnes, Devon, which from the early 17th century to 1903 resided at The Grange in the parish of Broadhembury near Honiton in Devon. Furthermore, the genealogist also produced an "authenticated descent" claiming to prove a link between the Drewe family of The Grange and the 12th century Anglo-Norman Dru (Latinized to Drogo), who in the reign of King Henry II (1154–1189) was lord of the manor of Teignton, later Drew's Teignton. However, by 1242 the manor of Teignton had passed from the Dru/Drogo family and was held by the Daubernon (or Dabernon) family. The manufactured pedigree suggested furthermore that Julius was also descended from the royal House of York through Edmund of Langley, 1st Duke of York's marriage to Isabella of Castile, Duchess of York. Having been told all this, in 1901 he bought the estate of Broadhembury House in the parish of Broadhembury and installed in it his elder brother William Drewe (d.1938), a wealthy barrister of the Inner Temple, who died there on 25 March 1938.

== Castle Drogo ==
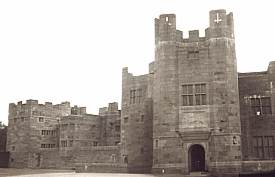
Castle Drogo, Devon

Julius's first cousin was Richard Peek, the rector of Drewsteignton (named after Drogo de Teigne, alleged forefather of the Drewes). Julius stayed on several occasions with his cousin and it must have been here that he conceived the idea of building a castle on the home ground of his ancestor. He found an ideal site, and in 1910 he bought about 450 acres (1.8 km^{2}) south and west of the village; by the time of his death he had bought up an estate of 1,500 acres. He then went to Edwin Lutyens, a prominent architect of the time, and asked him to build his castle. According to his son Basil, he did so on the advice of William Hudson, proprietor of Country Life, who was both a patron and a champion of Lutyens. Drewe was now 54 years old, but he still had time, energy and money to create his new family seat. On 4 April 1911, Drewe's 55th birthday, the first foundation stone was laid.

The castle took many years to complete, with the First World War and the economic downturn causing many delays. Castle Drogo was finally completed in 1930, a year before Julius died. Castle Drogo was the last castle to be built in England, and probably the last private house in the country to be built entirely of granite. It is now a Grade I listed building.

== Marriage and progeny ==
On 26 September 1890 Julius married Frances Richardson (d.1954), younger daughter of Thomas Richardson of Buxton, Derbyshire, by whom he had five children, three sons and two daughters, as follows:

- Adrian Drewe (1891–1917), eldest son and heir apparent. He died during World War I on the front line in 1917 at Ypres, Belgium, alongside about 80 to 100 men from his platoon. His death was a terrible loss to his father who never fully recovered from the shock.
- Basil Drewe (1894–1974), MC, 2nd son, a barrister (Queen's Counsel) of the Middle Temple, who became his father's heir and in 1931 succeeded him at Castle Drogo. He was awarded an OBE in 1943 for his work with RAF on radar.
- Cedric Drewe (1896–1971), MP, 3rd and youngest son, of Broadhembury House, who studied at the University of Birmingham between 1916 and 1920. He served as a member of parliament for South Molton in Devon (1924–29) and for Honiton (1931), and in 1953 was appointed a Knight Commander of the Royal Victorian Order. He inherited the Broadhembury properties after Julius's death.
- Mary Drewe
- Frances Drewe.

== Death and succession ==
Julius Drewe died on 10 November 1931 and was buried at Drewsteignton. His widow Frances and his eldest surviving son Basil Drewe continued to live in the castle. Frances Drewe died in 1954 and Basil was then joined at Drogo by his son Anthony Drewe and his wife. In 1974, Anthony Drewe and his son, Dr Christopher Drewe, gave Castle Drogo, 600 acres (2.4 km^{2}) of the surrounding estate, Whiddon Farm, several cottages in Drewsteignton and a financial dowry to the National Trust. It was the first property built in the 20th-century acquired by the charity.
