= Lord Burnett =

Lord Burnett may refer to:

- John Burnett, Baron Burnett (born 1945), British Liberal Democrat politician, MP for Torridge and West Devon
- Ian Burnett, Baron Burnett of Maldon (born 1958), Lord Chief Justice of England and Wales from 2017 to 2023
