= Torridge and West Devon =

UK Parliament constituency (1983–2024)

Coordinates: 50.715°N 4.263°W

- Former county constituency for the House of Commons
- Boundary of Torridge and West Devon in Devon

- Location of Devon within England
- County: Devon
- Electorate: 77,417 (December 2010)
- Major settlements: Bideford, Great Torrington, Holsworthy, Tavistock and Clovelly

1983–2024
- Seats: One
- Created from: Devon West and Devon North
- Replaced by: Torridge and Tavistock

Torridge and West Devon was a constituency (Note: A county constituency (for the purposes of election expenses and type of returning officer)) in Devon represented in the House of Commons of the UK Parliament. (Note: As with all constituencies, the constituency elects one Member of Parliament (MP) by the first past the post system of election at least every five years.)

Under the 2023 review of Westminster constituencies, the constituency was abolished. Subject to minor boundary changes, it was reformed as Torridge and Tavistock, which was first contested at the 2024 general election.

== Boundaries ==
Map of boundaries 2010–2024

1983–1997: The District of Torridge, and the Borough of West Devon.

1997–2010: The District of Torridge, and the Borough of West Devon except the ward of Buckland Monachorum.

2010–2024: The District of Torridge, and the Borough of West Devon wards of Bere Ferrers, Bridestowe, Buckland Monachorum, Burrator, Lydford, Mary Tavy, Milton Ford, Tamarside, Tavistock North, Tavistock South, Tavistock South West, Thrushel, and Walkham.

Before the 2010 general election, the constituency comprised Torridge District and almost all of West Devon District. However, in the redistribution of that year, when the number of seats in the county rose from 11 to 12, the town of Okehampton and scattered small settlements surrounding it transferred to the new Central Devon seat.

The constituency area contained the former borough constituencies of Bere Alston (abolished 1832, settlement part of Bere Ferrers) and Tavistock (abolished 1885).

== History ==
The constituency was created in 1983, largely from the abolished West Devon seat, but with additions then and later from North Devon which was formed in 1950.

Political history

The seat unusually saw its second member, (Emma Nicholson), who attained the second absolute majority in its history, a Conservative, defect or "cross the floor" in 1995 to the Liberal Democrats. After the 1997 election she was appointed to the House of Lords.

At 1997 election the seat was won by the Liberal Democrat candidate John Burnett. He also was elevated to the peerage, and after standing down, the seat was gained by Geoffrey Cox of the Conservative Party who attained a majority of 3,236 votes in 2005. In 2010 he won with a majority of 2,957, boundary changes making the reduced majority notionally a 0.2% swing from the Liberal Democrats – compared with a 2.3% swing between the two parties nationally.

In 2015 the Liberal Democrat vote collapsed and they came third behind UKIP and the Conservatives. Cox was elected with an absolute majority.

In 2017 the absence of UKIP saw Labour come second behind the Conservatives. Cox further increased his absolute majority, which became the largest in Devon and Cornwall.

In 2019, Cox was re-elected with 60.1% of the vote and a majority of 24,992 (41.8%), the highest vote share ever recorded in the seat, and once again the largest majority in Devon and Cornwall.

== Constituency profile ==
The economy of the area is dominated by sectors such as agriculture, food processing, defence, hospitality, construction, maintenance and engineering and from Bideford and Northam a small amount of fishing; it also includes tourism, such as the island of Lundy, and sandy resort of Westward Ho!, to the small, centrally pedestrianised, cobbled, museum-dotted village of Clovelly. Great Torrington and Buckland Monachorum are among the archetypal rural villages, in an area with tranquil retreats, relatively close to the edge of Dartmoor.

Workless claimants, registered jobseekers, were in November 2012 lower than the national average of 3.8%, at 2.5% of the population based on a statistical compilation by The Guardian.

== Members of Parliament ==
Election	Member	Party
1983	Peter Mills	Conservative
1987	Emma Nicholson	Conservative
1995	Emma Nicholson	Liberal Democrat
1997	John Burnett	Liberal Democrat
2005	Geoffrey Cox	Conservative

== Elections ==
=== Elections in the 2010s ===
General election 2019: Torridge and West Devon
Party	Candidate	Votes	%	±%
Conservative	Geoffrey Cox	35,904	60.1	+3.6
Liberal Democrats	David Chalmers	10,912	18.3	+0.6
Labour	Siobhan Strode	10,290	17.2	―4.5
Green	Chris Jordan	2,077	3.5	+0.8
Independent	Bob Wootton	547	0.9	New
Majority		24,992	41.8	+7.0
Turnout		59,730	74.8	+0.8
Conservative hold		Swing	+1.5	

General election 2017: Torridge and West Devon
Party	Candidate	Votes	%	±%
Conservative	Geoffrey Cox	33,612	56.5	+5.6
Labour Co-op	Vince Barry	12,926	21.7	+11.1
Liberal Democrats	David Chalmers	10,526	17.7	+4.5
Green	Chris Jordan	1,622	2.7	―4.3
Independent	Robin Julian	794	1.3	New
Majority		20,686	34.8	+2.2
Turnout		59,616	74.0	+1.8
Conservative hold		Swing	―2.4	

General election 2015: Torridge and West Devon
Party	Candidate	Votes	%	±%
Conservative	Geoffrey Cox	28,774	50.9	+5.2
UKIP	Derek Sargent	10,371	18.3	+12.8
Liberal Democrats	Paula Dolphin	7,483	13.2	–27.1
Labour	Mike Sparling	6,015	10.6	+5.3
Green	Cathrine Simmons	3,941	7.0	+5.1
Majority		18,403	32.6	+28.2
Turnout		56,786	72.2	+0.8
Conservative hold		Swing	–3.8	

General election 2010: Torridge and West Devon
Party	Candidate	Votes	%	±%
Conservative	Geoffrey Cox	25,230	45.7	+3.4
Liberal Democrats	Adam Symons	22,273	40.3	+3.4
UKIP	Robin Julian	3,021	5.5	–0.9
Labour	Darren Jones	2,917	5.3	–5.3
Green	Cathrine Simmons	1,050	1.9	–2.0
BNP	Nick Baker	766	1.4	New
Majority		2,957	5.4	–0.1
Turnout		55,257	71.4	+0.2
Conservative hold		Swing	0.0	

=== Elections in the 2000s ===
General election 2005: Torridge and West Devon
Party	Candidate	Votes	%	±%
Conservative	Geoffrey Cox	25,013	42.7	+2.7
Liberal Democrats	David Walter	21,777	37.2	–5.0
Labour	Rebecca Richards	6,001	10.2	–0.5
UKIP	Matthew Jackson	3,790	6.5	+1.7
Green	Peter Christie	2,003	3.4	+1.1
Majority		3,236	5.5	N/A
Turnout		58,584	70.2	–0.3
Conservative gain from Liberal Democrats		Swing	+3.9	

General election 2001: Torridge and West Devon
Party	Candidate	Votes	%	±%
Liberal Democrats	John Burnett	23,474	42.2	+0.3
Conservative	Geoffrey Cox	22,280	40.0	+1.5
Labour	David Brenton	5,959	10.7	–1.7
UKIP	Bob Edwards	2,674	4.8	+1.7
Green	Martin Quinn	1,297	2.3	New
Majority		1,194	2.2	–1.1
Turnout		55,684	70.5	–7.4
Liberal Democrats hold		Swing	–0.6	

=== Elections in the 1990s ===
General election 1997: Torridge and West Devon
Party	Candidate	Votes	%	±%
Liberal Democrats	John Burnett	24,744	41.8	+0.3
Conservative	Ian Liddell-Grainger	22,787	38.5	–8.8
Labour	David Brenton	7,319	12.4	+2.8
Referendum	Roger Lea	1,946	3.3	New
UKIP	Matthew Jackson	1,841	3.1	New
Liberal	Michael Pithouse	508	0.9	New
Majority		1,957	3.3	N/A
Turnout		59,145	77.9	–1.6
Liberal Democrats gain from Conservative		Swing	+4.6	

General election 1992: Torridge and West Devon
Party	Candidate	Votes	%	±%
Conservative	Emma Nicholson	29,627	47.3	–3.0
Liberal Democrats	David McBride	26,013	41.5	+2.3
Labour	David Brenton	5,997	9.6	+1.1
Green	Frank Williamson	898	1.4	–0.6
Natural Law	David Collins	141	0.2	New
Majority		3,614	5.8	–5.3
Turnout		62,676	81.5	+2.8
Conservative hold		Swing	–2.6	

=== Elections in the 1980s ===
General election 1987: Torridge and West Devon
Party	Candidate	Votes	%	±%
Conservative	Emma Nicholson	29,484	50.3	–7.7
Liberal	John Burnett	23,016	39.2	+4.2
Labour	David Brenton	4,990	8.5	+1.9
Green	Frank Williamson	1,168	2.0	New
Majority		6,468	11.1	–11.9
Turnout		58,658	78.7	+2.7
Conservative hold		Swing	–6.0	

General election 1983: Torridge and West Devon
Party	Candidate	Votes	%	±%
Conservative	Peter Mills	31,156	58.0	
Liberal	Victor Howell	18,805	35.0	
Labour	William Tupman	3,531	6.6	
Independent	Michael Beale	116	0.2	
Wessex Regionalists	Henrietta Rous	113	0.2	
Majority		12,351	23.0	
Turnout		53,721	76.0	
Conservative win (new seat)				

== See also ==
- Parliamentary constituencies in Devon
