= Glyn Mathias =

British journalist

- Born: 19 February 1945 (age 81)
- Education: Llandovery College; Jesus College, Oxford; University of Southampton
- Employer(s): ITN, BBC Wales, Electoral Commission, OFCOM
- Known for: Political journalist

Jonathan Glyn Mathias, OBE (born 19 February 1945) is a British print and broadcasting journalist of over thirty years' standing. He was a lobby correspondent at Westminster for thirteen years, and is the former Political Editor of Independent Television News (1981–1986) and BBC Wales (1994–1999). He was the Electoral Commission's Commissioner for Wales (2001–2008), and as of 2013 is a member of OFCOM's Content Board and Chair of OFCOM's Advisory Committee for Wales.

== Early life ==
Mathias was born on 19 February 1945, and is one of three children of the writer and poet Roland Mathias (1915–2007) and Mary Annie (Molly) Hawes. He moved around the country as he grew up, as his father (a teacher at the time) taught in places including Carlisle, London, and Pembroke.

== Education ==
Mathias was educated at Llandovery College, an independent boarding school in the market town of Llandovery in Carmarthenshire, in south-west Wales, followed by Jesus College at the University of Oxford and the University of Southampton.

== Career ==
Mathias started as a reporter on the South Wales Echo in 1967, before joining BBC Southampton in 1970. He joined Independent Television News, becoming ITN Political Correspondent in 1973 and ITN Home Affairs Correspondent in 1979. In 1981, Mathias became ITN Political Editor, replacing Julian Haviland, and became ITN's Controller of Public Affairs and Chief Political Correspondent in 1986.

From 1994 to 1999, Mathias was Political Editor of BBC Wales, and in 2001, he became an inaugural member of the Electoral Commission, serving as the Commissioner for Wales from 2001 to 2008. As Commissioner, he launched a campaign to try to persuade more people to vote in the Welsh Assembly elections. In March 2011, he was appointed by Carl Sargeant (Minister for Social Justice and Local Government in the Welsh Government) to review the programme of work of the Local Government Boundary Commission for Wales, prior to the 2016 local government elections. The Mathias Review made a series of detailed recommendations to that end.

In 2005, the Roland Mathias Poetry Prize was established under the auspices of the Brecknock Society and Museum Friends, and Glyn Mathias was its Committee chairman from 2005 to 2011. He has also been a director of Autism Cymru, The Beacons Trust and Brecon Action Ltd. In 2011, Mathias became Chair of OFCOM's Advisory Committee for Wales and a member of the OFCOM Content Board. In the same year, he became Chair of the New Welsh Review.

Mathias was appointed Officer of the Order of the British Empire (OBE) in the 2016 Birthday Honours for public services and services to broadcasting in Wales.

== Family ==
Mathias lives in the market town of Brecon in Powys, mid-Wales.

== Publications ==
Mathias's works include:

- Europe or the Open Sea? : The Political and Strategic Implications for Britain in the Common Market – co-author (Charles Knight & Company, London, 1971)
- ITN Election Factbook 1987 (Michael O'Mara Books, London, 1987)

Media offices
| Preceded by Julian Haviland | Political Editor of ITN; 1981–1986 | Succeeded by Michael Brunson |
