= West Devon (constituency) =

UK Parliament constituency (1974–1983)

- Former county constituency for the House of Commons
- West Devon in Devon, showing boundaries used from 1974 to 1983.

February 1974–1983
- Seats: one
- Created from: Tavistock and Torrington
- Replaced by: Torridge and West Devon and South Hams

West Devon was a county constituency in Devon, in the South-West of England. It returned one Member of Parliament (MP) to the House of Commons of the Parliament of the United Kingdom, elected by the first past the post system.

The constituency was created for the February 1974 general election, and abolished for the 1983 general election, when it was largely replaced by the new Torridge and West Devon constituency.

== Boundaries ==
The Boroughs of Great Torrington and Okehampton, and the Rural Districts of Holsworthy, Okehampton, Plympton St Mary, Tavistock, and Torrington.

== Members of Parliament ==
Election	Member	Party
Feb 1974	Peter Mills	Conservative
1983	constituency abolished: see Torridge and West Devon	

== Election results ==
General election February 1974: West Devon
Party	Candidate	Votes	%	±%
Conservative	Peter McLay Mills	23,524	50.19	
Liberal	Michael Azariah Pinney	18,256	38.95	
Labour	John Barnet Henry Duffin	5,089	10.86	
Majority		5,268	11.24	
Turnout		46,869	82.26	
Conservative win (new seat)				

General election October 1974: West Devon
Party	Candidate	Votes	%	±%
Conservative	Peter McLay Mills	22,594	50.03	
Liberal	Michael Azariah Pinney	16,665	36.90	
Labour	John Barnet Henry Duffin	5,899	13.06	
Majority		5,929	13.13	
Turnout		45,158	78.63	
Conservative hold		Swing		

General election 1979: West Devon
Party	Candidate	Votes	%	±%
Conservative	Peter McLay Mills	29,428	60.99	
Liberal	Victor Terry Howell	12,256	25.40	
Labour	RD Maddern	6,174	12.80	
National Front	R Bearsford-Walker	393	0.81	New
Majority		17,172	35.59	
Turnout		48,251	78.57	
Conservative hold		Swing		
