= Peter Mills (British politician) =

British politician

Member of Parliament for Torridge and West Devon
- In office 1983–1987

Member of Parliament for West Devon
- In office February 1974–1983

Member of Parliament for Torrington
- In office 1964-February 1974

Personal details
- Born: 22 September 1921
- Died: 16 August 1993 (aged 71)
- Party: Conservative

Sir Peter McLay Mills (22 September 1921 – 16 August 1993) was a Conservative Party politician in the United Kingdom and also a farmer. He served as a member of parliament (MP) for Torrington from 1964 to 1974, West Devon from 1974 to 1983 and Torridge and West Devon from 1983 to 1987. While an MP he served as Parliamentary Secretary to the Ministry of Agriculture and Fisheries in 1972, Parliamentary Under-Secretary of State for the Northern Ireland Office from 1972 to 1974, and was knighted for his work in 1982 Queen's Birthday Honours List.

Mills performed the official opening of the Meldon Reservoir in September 1972.

Parliament of the United Kingdom
Preceded by Percy Basil Browne	Member of Parliament for Torrington; 1964–Feb 1974	Constituency abolished
New constituency	Member of Parliament for West Devon; Feb 1974–1983	Constituency abolished
New constituency	Member of Parliament for Torridge and West Devon; 1983–1987	Succeeded by Emma Nicholson
