= George Lambert, 1st Viscount Lambert =

British politician (1866–1958)

The Right Honourable The Viscount Lambert PC
- Lambert in 1921

Member of Parliament for South Molton
- In office 1891–1924
- Preceded by: Newton Wallop
- Succeeded by: Cedric Drewe

Member of Parliament for South Molton
- In office 1929–1945
- Preceded by: Cedric Drewe
- Succeeded by: George Lambert, 2nd Viscount Lambert

Personal details
- Born: 25 June 1866 South Tawton, Devon, England
- Died: 17 February 1958 (aged 91) Spreyton, Devon, England
- Party: Liberal (1891–1931); National Liberal (1931–1958)
- Children: 4, including George Lambert, 2nd Viscount Lambert and Margaret Lambert

George Lambert, 1st Viscount Lambert, PC (25 June 1866 – 17 February 1958) was a long-serving British Member of Parliament (MP).

== Birth and education ==
George Lambert c1895

George Lambert c1910

Lambert was born in South Tawton in Devon, on 25 June 1866, the son of George Lambert Gorwyn (1818–1885) and his wife, Grace Howard.

George Lambert Gorwyn had inherited farms in Spreyton and Drewsteignton. He dropped the surname Gorwyn in the 1870s, becoming known merely as George Lambert. His wife, Grace Howard, was the daughter of a farm labourer from South Tawton, who had been his housekeeper. They married in 1866.

Lambert was educated at Spreyton School and North Tawton Grammar School. He left school after his father's death in 1885, and commenced farming.

== Political career ==
Lambert served as a County Councillor for Devonshire, 1889–1912, and as a County Alderman, 1912–1952.

He was first elected as Liberal MP for South Molton at a by-election in 1891. He was Civil Lord of the Admiralty, 1905–1915, "a post for which he had no obvious qualifications. 'A farmer sent to sea' was a jibe frequently heard in those days" (The Times). He lost his seat at the 1924 General Election to the Conservative Cedric Drewe, but regained it at the 1929 general election. Although he began his parliamentary career as a Liberal, in 1931 Lambert had become a National Liberal supporting the Conservative Party, following a long period criticising David Lloyd George and opposition to the Labour Party.

Lambert was made a Privy Councillor in 1912, and later the same year he was appointed to the Royal Commission on Fuel and Engines. He was created Viscount Lambert when he stepped down as an MP in July 1945, after 48 years, 348 days in the House of Commons, the fifth longest-serving MP of the 20th century.

His eldest son, the Hon. George Lambert, followed him as MP for South Molton, later Torrington, at the 1945 general election, and succeeded him as Viscount Lambert in 1958.

== Personal life ==
Lambert was married on 30 August 1904 to Barbara Stavers, the daughter of George Stavers, a ship-owner of Morpeth, by whom he had two daughters and two sons. His daughter Margaret Lambert was a historian specialising in German history.

He died, aged 91 years, at his home, "Coffins" in Spreyton on 17 February 1958.

Lambert "was a good shot, and was also fond of a round of golf."

== Arms ==
Coat of arms of George Lambert, 1st Viscount Lambert
Crest Issuant from a Mount Vert an Apple Tree fructed proper Escutcheon Azure a Chevron Or fretty of the first between in chief two Garbs and in base a Fleece of the second Supporters On either side a Cornish Chough proper collared Or Motto The Good Earth Provides

Parliament of the United Kingdom
Preceded by Newton Wallop	Member of Parliament for South Molton; 1891–1924	Succeeded by Cedric Drewe
Preceded by Cedric Drewe	Member of Parliament for South Molton; 1929–1945	Succeeded by George Lambert (2nd)
Peerage of the United Kingdom
New creation	Viscount Lambert; 1945–1958	Succeeded by George Lambert
