= Margaret Lambert =

British historian and art collector (1906–1995)

Margaret Lambert (7 November 1906 – 22 January 1995) was a British historian specialising in German history. She also collected and preserved English popular art with her partner, Enid Marx.

== Early life and education ==
The Honourable Margaret Barbara Lambert was born and grew up in Devon. Her father was George Lambert, 1st Viscount Lambert, and Winston and Clementine Churchill were visitors to her family home.

Lambert was privately educated and then attended Lady Margaret Hall, Oxford, where she studied PPE. She studied for her PhD at the London School of Economics under Charles Manning. In 1933, she spent time researching in Berlin, Saar and Paris for her thesis, which was entitled 'The Saar Territory as a Factor in Franco German Relations'. Lambert graduated in 1936.

In 1931, Lambert met Enid Marx and they became partners. Marx designed a cover for the 1934 book based on Lambert's thesis. Marx and Lambert collaborated in collecting for a book, When Victoria Began to Reign: A Coronation Year Scrapbook (1937) and built up a collection of vernacular art.

== Career ==
During World War II, Lambert worked for the Institute of International Affairs and as an Intelligence Officer for the BBC Austrian Service.

After the war, Lambert's tutor from Oxford, Mary Coate, helped her to become the assistant editor of Documents on British Foreign Policy, 1919–1939. She worked with Llewellyn Woodward and Rohan Butler on multiple volumes.

In 1946, Lambert and Marx had English Popular and Traditional Art published as part of the "Britain in Pictures" series. At the end of 1946, Lambert and Marx were part of a Council of Industrial Design team sent to Germany. They also undertook surveys in Scandinavia. In 1947, they travelled to Italy to conduct further research. Lambert and Marx wrote for W.J. Turner's British Craftsmanship (1948).

In 1949, Lambert became a Lecturer at the University of Exeter, but she left two years later to become editor-in-chief of the captured Documents on German Foreign Policy 1918-1945 for the Foreign Office. Lambert was the British historian (alongside Maurice Baumont and Paul Sweet from France and the US) responsible for examining the files and deciding what should be published, and when. She discussed the Marburg Files with Churchill and other government ministers, especially content relating to the Duke of Windsor. Lambert felt obliged to resign when Churchill said not to publish the files, and had been advised by Bernadotte Schmitt to publish, but faced pressure from many other British historians, including John Wheeler-Bennett, to agree to delay. Lambert was also a member of the international Historical Advisory Committee that discussed the return of documents to West Germany from 1956.

Lambert took up a Lectureship at the University of St Andrews in October 1956. She was the first woman to be hired directly into this role rather than promoted from being an assistant and had a starting salary of £1200 per year. Marx moved to live with Lambert in St Andrews. Lambert left St Andrews in January 1961 and returned to work for the Foreign Office.

In 1971, following Woodward's death, Lambert finished work on British Foreign Policy in the Second World War. She wrote a preface on the Dawes Plan and Hague Conference on reparations which was included in the Documents on British Foreign Policy published in 1975.

== Death and commemoration ==
Lambert and Marx's collection of popular art is held at the Compton Verney Art Gallery.

Lambert's memorial was commissioned by Marx and made by Judith Verity. It was placed at St Michael's, Spreyton.
