= Julian Haviland =

British journalist (1930–2023)

- Born: Julian Arthur Charles Haviland; 8 June 1930; Iver Heath, Buckinghamshire, England
- Died: 11 August 2023 (aged 93)
- Education: Eton College, Berkshire
- Alma mater: Magdalene College, Cambridge
- Occupations: Journalist; author
- Spouse: Caroline Barbour (m. 1959)
- Children: 3

Julian Arthur Charles Haviland (8 June 1930 – 11 August 2023) was a British print and broadcasting journalist whose career lasted over sixty years. He was a lobby correspondent at Westminster for over twenty years, and was the political editor of Independent Television News (1975–1981) and The Times newspaper (1981–1986). He was also the author of two books.

== Early life and education ==
Julian Arthur Charles Haviland was born on 8 June 1930, in the village of Iver Heath in Iver in Buckinghamshire. He was the son of Major Leonard Proby Haviland of the 6th Duke of Connaught's Own Lancers and military secretary to the governor-general of New Zealand, and Helen Dorothea Fergusson, the daughter of General Sir Charles and Lady Alice Fergusson. Haviland was educated at Eton College and Magdalene College, Cambridge.

== Life and career ==
After leaving university, Haviland joined the Surrey Advertiser and worked as a reporter. He then joined the Johannesburg Star in South Africa as a reporter, where he learned to speak Afrikaans, returning to the UK in 1959. He then joined The Daily Telegraph in London and was then a reporter for the London Evening Standard.

In 1961, Haviland joined Independent Television News as a reporter and occasional newscaster. He became ITN's political correspondent in 1965, and in 1975 its political editor. He reported on the devaluation crisis facing Harold Wilson, the election of Edward Heath and the three-day week, and the subsequent return of Wilson to power. He was the first person to interview Margaret Thatcher on her victory in the Conservative Party leadership contest on 11 February 1975.

He interviewed James Callaghan when he became prime minister a year later. Haviland contrasted his attitude to political reporting with that of ITN's then news editor, Don Horobin, thus: "(for him) it was the Daily Mail that set ITN's agenda. My view was that at ITN we must be at least as responsible and accurate as the BBC, without being so damned boring". He was also known on-screen for wearing a plain jersey below the jacket rather than the more formal attire of a waistcoat.

Haviland was a member of the 1975 Houghton Committee, and co-wrote the minority report which persuaded Parliament not to introduce state funding of political parties, as had been advocated by some members and suggested by others inside and outside Westminster.

In 1981, Haviland joined The Times as political editor, reporting on the early problems facing Thatcher's first government. He retired from daily print journalism in 1986, the year of the Wapping dispute between the newspaper's proprietor and the print unions. He moved to Tomintianda, on the banks of Loch Tummel in Strathtummel in the Scottish Highlands, where he wrote two books and occasionally contributed to national political debate. He attended a political reunion of ITN's past and present political editors in 2011, to bid farewell to a colleague of many years' standing, and the following year, the funeral of his former ITN colleague, David Walter.

== Personal life and death ==
Haviland married Caroline Victoria Barbour, daughter of George Freeland Barbour, in September 1959; they had three sons.

Julian Haviland died on 11 August 2023, at age 93.

== Publications ==
- Take Care, Mr. Baker! The Advice on Education Reform Which the Government Collected But Concealed. London: Fourth Estate. 1988. ISBN 9780947795870.
- Talking Heads: Planning Human Resource Development. London: National Economic Development Office. 1989. ISBN 9780729209526.

Media offices
Preceded by Unknown; Alastair Burnet 1963 – 1964	Political Editor of ITN; 1975–1981	Succeeded by Glyn Mathias
