= George Lambert, 2nd Viscount Lambert =

The Right Honourable The Viscount Lambert DL TD
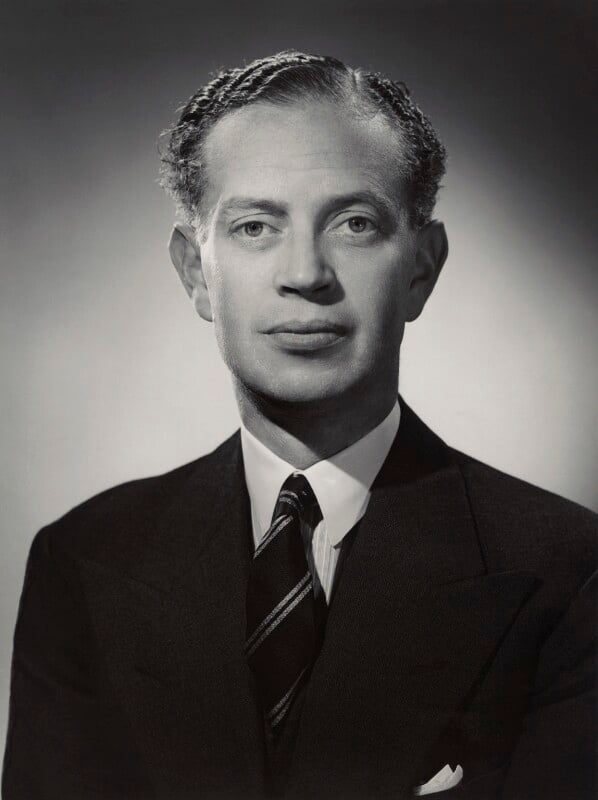
- Lambert in 1949

Member of Parliament for South Molton
- In office 1945–1950
- Preceded by: George Lambert, 1st Viscount Lambert
- Succeeded by: Constituency abolished

Member of Parliament for Torrington
- In office 1950–1958
- Preceded by: New constituency
- Succeeded by: Mark Bonham Carter

Personal details
- Born: 27 November 1909
- Died: 24 May 1989 (aged 79) Switzerland
- Party: National Liberal

George Lambert, 2nd Viscount Lambert, DL TD (27 November 1909 – 24 May 1989) was a British politician.

== Early life ==
Lambert was the eldest son of long-serving Devon Member of Parliament, the Rt. Hon. George Lambert. He was educated at Harrow and New College, Oxford. During World War II, he was commissioned into the Royal Engineers, but transferred to the Royal Artillery in 1940. He became a lieutenant-colonel and a war Office liaison officer, visiting the Mediterranean, India and South-East Asia Commands.

== Political career ==
In Parliament, Lambert spoke on agriculture matters. After almost fifty years in Parliament, George Lambert senior stepped down at the 1945 general election and was created Viscount Lambert. Lambert junior stood successfully as a National Liberal candidate in his father's seat, South Molton. In 1950 the constituency was abolished and replaced by Torrington, which Lambert continued to serve until his father's death in 1958, at which point he joined the House of Lords. This prompted the 1958 Torrington by-election and the Liberal Party's first by-election gain in almost thirty years.

== Personal life ==
He married Patricia (Patsy) Quinn in 1939. Quinn who was Anglo-Irish, came over from her family home Greylands in Dalkey just south of Dublin to be educated in England where she was educated at the Sacred Heart Convent in Roehampton where she shared a room with Vivien Leigh and they became lifelong friends; she was a bridesmaid at her first wedding. She was a model for Norman Hartnell the famous designer and regularly modelled for HM the Queen (later the Queen Mother).

Lambert and his wife had a son, George, educated at Harrow, who served in the Royal Horseguards (Blues) retiring as a Captain, who died in 1970 in a car accident at the age of 29, and a daughter Louise, who married Sir Peter Gibbings in 1975, Chairman of the Guardian Newspaper 1973-1988 and the Radio Authority. Lady Gibbings works in the voluntary sector supporting mentoring and prison visiting programmes. She is a trustee of the Forward Trust. They have one son Dominic

Lord Lambert handed the family estate Coffins at Spreyton near Crediton in Devon to his son George who, as mentioned above, was tragically killed in a car accident in 1971. After 6 generations of Lambert occupation Coffins was sold in 1972 and Lambert moved to Switzerland where he died in 1989. Patsy, Viscountess Lambert, died in 1991.

His brother Michael who lived near Siena inherited the title but he died without male issue in 1999 and the title became extinct.

== Arms ==
Coat of arms of George Lambert, 2nd Viscount Lambert
Crest Issuant from a Mount Vert an Apple Tree fructed proper Escutcheon Azure a Chevron Or fretty of the first between in chief two Garbs and in base a Fleece of the second Supporters On either side a Cornish Chough proper collared Or Motto The Good Earth Provides

Parliament of the United Kingdom
Preceded by George Lambert (1st)	Member of Parliament for South Molton; 1945–1950	Constituency abolished
New constituency	Member of Parliament for Torrington; 1950–1958	Succeeded by Mark Bonham Carter
Peerage of the United Kingdom
Preceded by George Lambert (1st)	Viscount Lambert; 1958–1989	Succeeded by Michael Lambert
