= Mark Bonham Carter, Baron Bonham-Carter =

English publisher and politician

The Right Honourable The Lord Bonham-Carter

Member of the House of Lords Lord Temporal
- In office 21 July 1986 – 4 September 1994; Life Peerage

Member of Parliament for Torrington
- In office 27 March 1958 – 18 September 1959
- Preceded by: George Lambert
- Succeeded by: Percy Browne

Personal details
- Born: 11 February 1922 Marylebone, London, England
- Died: 4 September 1994 (aged 72) Salerno, Italy
- Party: Liberal (before 1988); Liberal Democrats (after 1988)
- Spouse: Leslie Nast (m. 1955)
- Children: 3, including Jane
- Relatives: Helena Bonham Carter (niece)
- Education: Winchester College
- Alma mater: Balliol College, Oxford
- Occupation: Publisher, politician
- Military career
- Allegiance: United Kingdom
- Branch: British Army
- Service years: 1941–1945
- Unit: Grenadier Guards
- Awards: Mentioned in dispatches

Mark Raymond Bonham Carter, Baron Bonham-Carter (11 February 1922 – 4 September 1994) was an English publisher and politician. A member of the Bonham-Carter family, he was created a life peer in 1986.

== Early life ==
Bonham-Carter was the son of the Liberal activists Sir Maurice Bonham-Carter and his wife, the former Lady Violet Asquith, daughter of the Liberal Prime Minister H. H. Asquith. He was the second-youngest of four children: Helen, Laura and Raymond.

Educated at Winchester College and Balliol College, Oxford, where he read PPE, his studies were interrupted by the Second World War, and he was commissioned in the Grenadier Guards in November 1941. Captured in Tunisia in 1943 and imprisoned in Italy, he escaped and walked four hundred miles to return to British lines, being mentioned in dispatches. Bonham-Carter concluded the war by standing as the unsuccessful Liberal candidate for Barnstaple in the 1945 general election, before returning to finish the last year of his course at Oxford. He then spent a year at the University of Chicago as a Commonwealth Fund Fellow before going into publishing, working for the Collins publishing firm, but left as his directors did not agree with his political activities.

In 1955, he married Leslie, Lady St Just, the former wife of Peter George Grenfell, 2nd Baron St Just (1922–1984), and the younger daughter of American magazine publisher Condé Nast. By her, Bonham-Carter had three daughters: Jane (created Baroness Bonham-Carter of Yarnbury), Virginia, and Eliza Bonham Carter. He also had a stepdaughter from his wife's former marriage.

== Torrington ==
Although Bonham-Carter's sister Laura had married future Liberal MP Jo Grimond in May 1938, he was in the process of joining the Conservative Party until the Suez Crisis of 1956, and election of Grimond as Liberal Party leader in the same year. It was in 1958 that the Torrington by-election was called in a safe Conservative seat, and Bonham-Carter became the Liberal candidate. Much to everyone's surprise, he won, overturning a 9,000 majority, giving the Liberals their first by-election gain since 1929. Bonham-Carter's margin of victory was extremely slim, at just 219 votes. Nonetheless, it was a major boost to the success-deprived Liberals and the first in a string of by-election victories that would make up the postwar Liberal Revival.

Grimond was personally hopeful that the articulate Bonham-Carter would be his designated successor, but it was not to be; at the 1959 general election, just 18 months after his victory, he narrowly lost the seat to the Conservatives. He continued to be a close advisor to Grimond throughout the latter's leadership but would never again be an MP, despite a third, unsuccessful, and equally close candidature for Torrington at the 1964 general election.

== Later life and death ==
Bonham-Carter found other outlets for his political and publishing interests. He continued to work as a prominent member of the Collins firm, becoming close friends with Roy Jenkins (reportedly his wife's lover) and serving as his literary agent. He became the first chairman of the Race Relations Board 1966–1971, and its successor, the Community Relations Commission 1971–1977. He was also prominent in the Arts world, as one of the directors of the Royal Opera House 1958–1982, a Governor of the Royal Ballet 1960–1994 (chairman of the board after 1985), and vice-chairman of the BBC 1975–1980, being vetoed as chairman by Margaret Thatcher. On 21 July 1986 Bonham-Carter was created a life peer as Baron Bonham-Carter, of Yarnbury in the County of Wiltshire. He became Foreign Affairs spokesman for the Liberal Democrats. His last campaign focused on granting British citizenship to ethnic minorities in Hong Kong, a measure that was only passed after his death. He was also an uncle of the actress Helena Bonham Carter.

Bonham-Carter died from a heart attack while holidaying in Italy on 4 September 1994 and is buried in St. John the Baptist Church in Stockton, Wiltshire.

== Arms ==
Coat of arms of Mark Bonham Carter, Baron Bonham-Carter

Coronet
A Coronet of a Baron
Crest
1st, A Lion's Head erased Or between two Estoiles each within the horns of a Crescent Azure (Carter); 2nd, A Dragon's Head erased Argent guttée de sang between two Fountains (Bonham)
Escutcheon
Quarterly: 1st and 4th, Azure two Lions combatant Or collared and lined Gules supporting with their interior paws a Mural Crown Gold (Carter); 2nd and 3rd, Gules a Sword erect between in chief two Cross Crosslets fitchée Argent over all a Chevron of the last (Bonham)
Motto
Trusty to the end

== See also ==
- Bonham Carter family

Parliament of the United Kingdom
Preceded by Hon. George Lambert	Member of Parliament for Torrington; 1958–1959	Succeeded by Percy Browne
