= Emma Nicholson =

British politician, life peer (born 1941)

The Right Honourable The Baroness Nicholson of Winterbourne
- Official portrait, 2026

Member of the House of Lords
- Lord Temporal
- Life peerage 3 November 1997

Member of the European Parliament for South East England
- In office 10 June 1999 – 4 June 2009
- Preceded by: Position established
- Succeeded by: Catherine Bearder

Member of Parliament for Torridge and West Devon
- In office 11 June 1987 – 8 April 1997
- Preceded by: Peter Mills
- Succeeded by: John Burnett

Personal details
- Born: Emma Harriet Nicholson; 16 October 1941 (age 85) Oxford, England
- Party: Conservative (before 1995; since 2016)
- Other political affiliations: Liberal Democrats (1995–Jul. 2016); Non-affiliated (Jul.–Sept. 2016)
- Spouse: Sir Michael Harris Caine (m. 1987; died 1999)
- Children: 1
- Parent(s): Katharine and Godfrey Nicholson
- Relatives: Reginald Manningham-Buller, 1st Viscount Dilhorne (uncle); John Manningham-Buller, 2nd Viscount Dilhorne (cousin); Eliza Manningham-Buller (cousin)
- Education: St Mary's School, Wantage; Royal Academy of Music
- Occupation: Politician

Emma Harriet Nicholson, Baroness Nicholson of Winterbourne (born 16 October 1941) is a British politician, who has been a life peer since 1997. She was elected as the Conservative Member of Parliament (MP) for Torridge and West Devon in 1987, before switching to the Liberal Democrats in 1995. Nicholson was also a Liberal Democrat Member of the European Parliament (MEP) for South East England from 1999 to 2009. In 2016, she announced she was rejoining the Conservative Party "with tremendous pleasure". In 2017, she was appointed as the Prime Minister's Trade Envoy for Kazakhstan.

== Early life ==
Born in Oxford and a descendant of the family that founded London gin distillers J&W Nicholson & Co, Emma Nicholson is the third of four daughters of Sir Godfrey Nicholson, Bt and his wife, Lady Katharine (the fifth daughter of the 27th Earl of Crawford). Her uncle was Lord Chancellor in the 1960s, and his daughter, her cousin Eliza Manningham-Buller, became Director General of MI5.

Emma was diagnosed as deaf at the age of 16. She was educated at St Mary's School, Wantage, and the Royal Academy of Music.

== Career ==
Before her political career, Nicholson was a computer programmer and systems analyst from 1962 to 1974, and a director of the Save the Children Foundation from 1974 to 1985.

She unsuccessfully contested the constituency of Blyth in the 1979 general election. She was elected a Conservative Member of Parliament for Torridge and West Devon in 1987, having acted as a vice-chairman of the Conservative Party between 1983 and 1987. She defected to the Liberal Democrats in December 1995, telling Robin Oakley, the BBC's Political Editor: "The Conservative Party has changed so much, while my principles have not changed at all. I would argue that it is not so much a case of my leaving the party, but the party leaving me."

Nicholson fought for the release of Katiza Cebekhulu, the "missing witness" in the case of the death of Stompie Seipei. The South African national had been part of the so-called Mandela United Football Club, the bodyguards of Winnie Mandela. Cebekhulu later claimed that Nicholson had demanded £50,000 from him to obtain copyright over a book she had Fred Bridgland write about him; Nicholson denied this, saying her motives were "exclusively humanitarian and honourable".

As an MP, Nicholson voted for Section 28, which banned schools and local authorities from promoting homosexuality and denounced lesbian families as "neither normal nor natural". She also voted against an equal age of consent for heterosexuals and homosexuals and her opposition to gay rights led a group called the Lesbian Avengers to organise a "tea party-cum-protest" on her lawn.

She was succeeded by John Burnett, later Baron Burnett, in 1997, when Tony Blair won his landslide. That year, Nicholson was made a life peer as Baroness Nicholson of Winterbourne, in the Royal County of Berkshire.

== European Parliament ==
Nicholson became a member of the European Parliament in 1999, joining the Committee on Foreign Affairs and serving as the committee's vice-president from 2004 to 2007. She was President of the Delegation for Relations with Iraq and President of the Committee on Women's Rights of the Euro-Mediterranean Parliamentary Assembly. Nicholson was also a member of the subcommittee on Human Rights, the Delegation for relations with Iran and the Delegation for relations with the Mashreq countries (i.e. the eastern Arab world). She was Rapporteur for Kashmir, and in 2007 her controversial report on Kashmir was passed by a majority of 522 to 9.

During the Iraq War, Nicholson gave evidence to the United Nations that she claimed showed Iraq had "hidden material used to make weapons of mass destruction". She described the draining of the Mesopotamian Marshes as a "genocide".

She has monitored elections in many countries. In 2006, Nicholson was Chief Observer of the European Union Election Observation Mission to Yemen. She was a member of European Union Election Observation Missions to Palestine (2005), Azerbaijan (2005), Lebanon (2005), Afghanistan (2005), Armenia (2007) and Pakistan (2008). In January and December 2005 she was a member of the United Nations Election Observation Missions to Iraq.

She also generated controversy through her strong opposition to international adoptions, which she believed had become a market and subject to corruption. While the European Parliament's Special Rapporteur for Romania's EU accession she and some others in the international community criticised international adoptions. Due partially to her pressure, the Romanian government in 2005 implemented legislation that de facto banned the practice, in line with practices in some of the EU member states. The measure generated controversy, mainly in the US, Israel, France, Spain and Italy, particularly from prospective parents. International and Romanian media also called attention to poor conditions in Romanian orphanages and hospitals where abandoned children remained for prolonged periods, while acknowledging some progress made in reforming child protection. In December 2005 and July 2006, the EP passed measures requesting Romania deal with outstanding pipeline cases, despite Romania having dismissed these formally through legislation after consultation with an Independent Panel of EU Experts on Family Law. Critics claimed that this panel was stacked with opponents of international adoptions. The U.S. Congress also passed repeated measures and held hearings opposing the ban.

Nicholson stood down from the European Parliament at the 2009 elections.

== House of Lords ==
In 2009, Lady Nicholson returned to London and resumed her political work at the House of Lords. In February 2010, she founded the All-party parliamentary group (APPG) for Business Development in Iraq and the Regions and has served as its chair. She is also a member of the All-Party Parliamentary Group for Human Trafficking, chairs the All-Party Parliamentary Group for Foreign Affairs and speaks regularly on health care and education in the Middle East and Eastern Europe and business development in Iraq and its wider neighbourhood. In 2013 she argued that the Iraq War was "resoundingly" worth it, and claiming Liberal Democrat party members who took an opposing stance were "guilty of hypocrisy". She was appointed as Prime Minister's Trade Envoy for Iraq on 30 January 2014.

She resigned the Liberal Democrat whip in July 2016, to sit as a non-affiliated member. However, on 10 September 2016, she announced she was re-joining the Conservative Party "with tremendous pleasure" and would sit on the Conservative benches in the House of Lords. Listing her reasons for rejoining the Tories, she highlighted Theresa May's education speech on 9 September, quoting May's position on grammar schools as evidence that the prime minister "leads a party with a real commitment to delivering for the next generation and building a country that works for everyone". However, the Liberal Democrats claimed that she had said her reason for leaving the party was her position on Europe.

Nicholson visited Kazakhstan as the Prime Minister's Trade Envoy on 28 April 2019. The six-day visit was focused on expanding trade relations with the Central Asian country.

She voted against gay marriage on the grounds it would degrade "the status of women and of girls".

She is a supporter of the LGB Alliance and the group has thanked for her "unwavering support".

== Other work ==
Nicholson is the Executive Chairman of the AMAR Foundation, which works to rebuild and improve the lives of disadvantaged communities in war-torn areas.

She is Executive Chairman of the Iraq Britain Business Council an organisation that facilitates business, trade investment, human resources, training and transfer of technology and know-how into the Republic of Iraq.

Nicholson is Executive Chairman of the Associatia Children's High Level Group. She co-founded its English counterpart, the Children's High Level Group (now the charity Lumos, "working to end the harm of institutionalisation & help children worldwide be reunited with family") with novelist and philanthropist J. K. Rowling. Lady Nicholson is the co-chairman with the Prime Minister of Romania of the High Level Group for Romania's Children and the co-chairman with the Prime Minister of Moldova of the High Level Group for Moldovan Children.

She is also a member of the American Bar Association's Middle East North Africa Council, the Arab Gulf Programme for United Nations Development Organisations Prize Committee and Freedom House International Solidarity Committee. She is a board member of the Foundation for Dialogue Among Civilisations, the American Islamic Congress, and a member of the Board of Advisors for the New York University Center for Dialogues, Islamic World. She is vice-president of The Little Foundation, and is Honorary Advisor to the Prime Minister and Government of Iraq on Public Health and related issues.

Nicholson was a Trustee of the Booker Prize until 2009, after which she was made an honorary vice-president. In June 2020, Nicholson referred to model Munroe Bergdorf on Twitter as "a weird creature" and shared posts Bergdorf considered transphobic, resulting in an official complaint to the Parliamentary Standards Commissioner. This led to criticism of Booker from writers including Damian Barr, Marlon James and Sarah Perry. Booker subsequently announced that they would be dissolving all honorary titles and roles associated with the event.

== Personal life ==
On 9 May 1987, Nicholson married Sir Michael Harris Caine, with whom she had a foster son Amar Kanim, who was rescued from Iraq after surviving a napalm attack in March 1991. She set up the Amar Foundation to support projects in Iraq. She is President of the Council of the Caine Prize for African Writing, which was named after her late husband.

Nicholson was widowed in 1999 and alleged negligence by hospital staff treating her husband at King Edward VII's Hospital. Nicholson claims that nurses at the King Edward VII refused to call consultants and doctors despite her husband's distress when a breathing tube could not be cleared. In September 1999 The Guardian reported that Baroness Nicholson was due to pursue legal action against the hospital alleging negligence. In light of her husband's death, Baroness Nicholson said:

I find it repugnant that NHS beds should be used as a final resource by the private hospitals who set themselves up as being able to cope and yet demonstrably cannot. I don't see why the NHS resource should be leached away in this way.

== Awards and honours ==
In 2017, Lady Nicholson received an honorary doctorate in International Leadership and Humanitarian Service from Brigham Young University in the United States for her charity and humanitarian work across the Middle East.

Coat of arms of Emma Nicholson
Escutcheon Per pale Azure and Gules two bars gemel Ermine in chief three suns in splendour Or. Supporters On either side a swan wings inverted and addorsed Argent beaked and legged and gorged with an ancient crown attached thereto a line reflexed over the back Or charged on the breast with an ermine spot. Motto Numen Lumen Badge A swan naiant wings elevated and addorsed Argent beaked Or within an ancient crown the base thereof conjoined to the base of an ancient crown reversed also Or naiant therein to the dexter a swan reversed wings elevated and addorsed Argent beaked Or.

Parliament of the United Kingdom
Preceded by Peter Mills	Member of Parliament for Torridge and West Devon; 1987–1997	Succeeded by John Burnett
