= 1891 South Molton by-election =

UK parliamentary by-election

The 1891 South Molton by-election was held on 13 November 1891 after the incumbent Liberal Unionist MP Newton Wallop was elevated to the peerage. The by-election was won by the Liberal candidate, George Lambert who would hold the seat with one short interruption until 1945.

George Lambert

South Molton by-election, 1891
| Party | Candidate | Votes | % | ±% |
|---|---|---|---|---|
| Liberal | George Lambert | 4,222 | 58.4 | +21.6 |
| Liberal Unionist | C W Buller | 3,010 | 41.6 | −21.6 |
| Majority | | 1,212 | 16.8 | N/A |
| Turnout | | 7,232 | 83.0 | +14.6 |
| Liberal gain from Liberal Unionist | | Swing | +21.6 | |
