= Broadhembury =

Village in Devon, England

Coordinates: 50.835556°N 3.2775°W

- Location within Devon
- Population: 654 (2001 Census)
- Civil parish: Broadhembury
- District: East Devon
- Shire county: Devon
- Region: South West
- Country: England
- Sovereign state: United Kingdom
- Post town: Honiton
- Postcode district: EX14
- Police: Devon and Cornwall
- Fire: Devon and Somerset
- Ambulance: South Western
- UK Parliament: Honiton and Sidmouth

Broadhembury is a village and civil parish in the East Devon district of Devon, England, 5 miles (8 km) north-west of Honiton.

The civil parish includes the hamlets of Kerswell, Dulford, Crammer Barton, Colliton and Luton, all to the west of the village. According to the 2001 census the civil parish had a population of 654. Broadhembury is part of the electoral ward of Tale Vale. The total population of this ward at the 2011 Census was 2,514. It is within the Blackdown Hills Area of Outstanding Natural Beauty.

== History ==
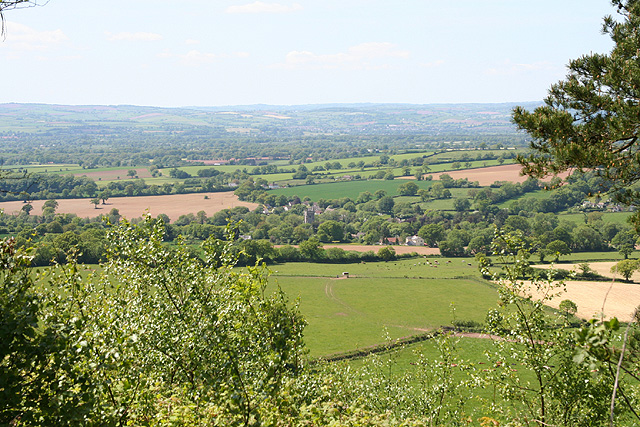
Broadhembury, seen from the west.

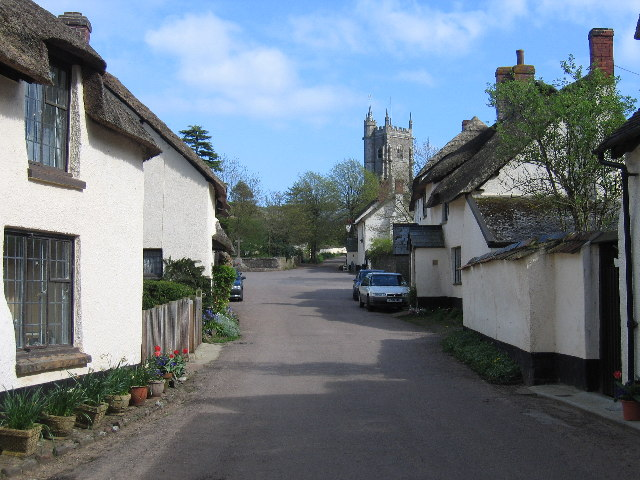
Church

Broadhembury is set in the centre of a horseshoe of the hills of Hembury Fort and North Hill, which rise to 1000 feet and create a sheltered valley.

Hembury Fort, a prehistoric hill fort dating from 3000 BC, was also used by the Romans. After the departure of the Romans, this area of Devon was sparsely occupied by the Celtic people. In those years Hembury Fort was called Handria. With the arrival of the Saxons, little wattle churches were built and the villagers lived in little cells or wooden huts. The Saxons brought the plough and cultivated the holdings. At the time of the Norman conquest of England in 1066, the population density of Broadhembury was 9 per square mile. During the Black Death of 1364, the population was affected, with two priests dying of it.

Henry VIII presented the land at Broadhembury to his faithful courtier, Thomas Wriothesley, Earl of Southampton, who sold it to Sir Thomas Drewe, son of Edward Drewe. Edward Drewe was responsible for the building of the manor house adjoining a small farm house at The Grange in about 1603. Edward was a sergeant at arms to Queen Elizabeth.

Broadhembury has changed very little in outward appearance during the last century, with many of the thatch and cob cottages standing since the 16th century.

F. W. Boreham, the writer and pastor, wrote in 1926 in his book A Faggot of Torches (p. 23), "If, on the face of God’s earth, there is anywhere a more peaceful and picturesque place than Broadhembury, I should dearly love to be taken to it."

Julius Drewe purchased the inn, and half the village, at the turn of the 20th century. Broadhembury House, the large thatched residence on the north side of the church, was converted by him from an old cottage. The garden is of particular beauty.

The descendants of Julius Drewe of Castle Drogo, Drewsteignton, still live in the village in Broadhembury House.

== Historic estates ==
- The Grange, Broadhembury, long owned by the Drewe family.

== People ==
- Augustus Montague Toplady, author of the hymn 'Rock of Ages', was vicar of Broadhembury from 1768 to 1778.
- Charles Buller Heberden, Principal of Brasenose College, Oxford and Vice-Chancellor of Oxford University, was born in the village on 14 May 1849.
- Kirstie Allsopp, host of Location, Location, Location, has a home in Broadhembury.
