= David Walter (journalist) =

British journalist

- Born: David Charles Walter; 1 February 1948; Newcastle upon Tyne, Northumberland, England
- Died: 29 March 2012 (aged 64); Royal Marsden Hospital, London
- Education: Charterhouse School, Surrey (independent boarding school); Trinity College, Oxford; Massachusetts Institute of Technology
- Occupations: Journalist, correspondent, political presenter, author, politician
- Employer(s): ITN, BBC
- Known for: Fmr. ITN Political Correspondent; Fmr. BBC Paris Correspondent; Former Liberal Democrat parliamentary contender

David Charles Walter (1 February 1948 – 29 March 2012), was a British journalist and a former Political Correspondent for Independent Television News programmes on ITV from 1980 to 1986, then on ITN's Channel 4 News from 1986 to 1988, followed by Paris Correspondent for BBC News, a BBC television and radio producer and presenter, and a Liberal Democrat contender for a seat in the British Parliament (Torridge and West Devon, 2005). He was a direct descendant of John Walter (1738/9 – 1812), the founder of The Times newspaper, whilst his mother was a cousin of former Home Secretary William Whitelaw.

== Early life ==
David Walter was born on 1 February 1948, in Newcastle upon Tyne, Northumberland. He had a younger brother, Christopher. His father was a district officer in the British Colonial Service, and was mostly based in Nigeria in West Africa.

== Education ==
Walter was educated at Charterhouse School, a boarding independent school for boys in the market town of Godalming in Surrey, followed by Trinity College, Oxford, to both of which he won scholarships. At Oxford, he studied Classics and became President of the Oxford Union. He was then awarded a Kennedy Memorial Scholarship to the Massachusetts Institute of Technology (often abbreviated to M.I.T.) in Cambridge, Massachusetts, where he studied Political science.

== Life and career ==
In 1971, Walter joined the BBC as a radio producer, first for the BBC World Service followed by BBC Radio London and BBC Radio 4, where he produced political programmes. He then joined BBC Television, first on Newsnight as a political producer for the late Professor Robert Mckenzie. He also worked on the Nationwide and Newsweek programmes.

In 1980, Walter joined ITN as a Political Correspondent, under the-then ITN Political Editor, Julian Haviland. In 1982, he reported on the Falklands War, and accompanied the-then Prime Minister, Margaret Thatcher, on overseas assignment as she visited the islands at the end of that year.

In 1986, Walter joined ITN's Channel 4 News, covering British and European issues. In 1988, he returned to the BBC to present Eurofile, a former weekly round-up programme of major European stories, on BBC Radio 4, and several editions of Panorama and Education Matters, including some phone-in programmes, on BBC One. He also presented reports for BBC One's On the Record programme and BBC Two's Newsnight. He later became Paris Correspondent for BBC News.

Walter was a lifelong supporter of liberal causes and of the Liberal Party (later to become the Liberal Democrats). In 1998, he left broadcasting to become communications director for the Liberal Democrats, followed by director of party broadcasting. Whilst there, he helped among other things to prepare Liberal Democrat MPs for appearances on such programmes as BBC One's Question Time and BBC Radio 4's Any Questions?, and wrote speeches for both Paddy Ashdown and Charles Kennedy. He stepped down from his advisory role in 2003.

In 2005, Walter decided to stand for Parliament, when John Burnett, the Liberal Democrat MP for the marginal Lib Dem constituency of Torridge and West Devon, announced his intention to stand down at the 2005 General Election. Although he failed to take the seat, he continued campaigning for the Liberal Democrats, becoming chair of his local party in Kingston-upon-Thames.

After leaving day-to-day national politics, Walter created his own media consultancy company, First Take, a public relations and media company that taught media skills, and had a wide number of British and overseas clients.

Walter was a member of the jury of the Royal Television Society Awards, a member of the Westminster Foundation for Democracy and President of The Media Society, a charity that campaigns for freedom of expression and encourages high standards in journalism. He wrote for The Guardian, The Times, and The Daily Telegraph newspapers, and The Economist and the New Statesman magazines, on topical political issues, and in his spare time, was involved locally in sports and amateur dramatics.

== Death ==
Walter was diagnosed and treated for cancer, a condition from which he died on 29 March 2012 at the Royal Marsden Hospital in London, a specialist hospital for the treatment of cancer patients. Paying tribute to him, The Media Society described him as "the polite embodiment of the very best of fair and honest journalism". His former boss at ITN, and 18 years his senior, the Political Editor Julian Haviland, himself described by colleagues as one of the nicest people to have ever worked in television journalism, said of him: "The man I think of first was in rare measure gentle, kind, modest, loyal, generous... a joy to work with". He went on to describe Walter's "sense of fun and joie de vivre", and that he "cheered us all on bleak days". And praising his journalistic skills and integrity, he said that Walter possessed "high intelligence and also political intelligence, or nous, which is rarer", and that he was "the least cynical of men".

== Family ==
Walter is survived by his wife, Pamela May, whom he married in 1970, and had a daughter, Natalie, an actress, and a son, Peter.
