= John Burnett, Baron Burnett =

British politician (born 1945)

The Right Honourable The Lord Burnett

Member of the House of Lords
- Lord Temporal
- Life peerage 31 May 2006

Member of Parliament for Torridge and West Devon
- In office 1 May 1997 – 11 April 2005
- Preceded by: Emma Nicholson
- Succeeded by: Geoffrey Cox

Personal details
- Born: John Patrick Aubone Burnett; 19 September 1945 (age 81)
- Party: Liberal Democrats
- Occupation: Politician, solicitor

John Patrick Aubone Burnett, Baron Burnett (born 19 September 1945) is a British Liberal Democrat politician, a member of the House of Lords, and was a Member of Parliament for Torridge and West Devon between 1997 and 2005 general elections.

== Personal life ==
John Burnett is the son of Lieutenant Colonel Aubone Burnett OBE (1909–1958) an army lawyer, and Joan Bolt. He was educated at Ampleforth College before joining the Royal Marines.

He was a commando with the Royal Marines for seven years, a Devon Ruby cattle-breeder, and remains a Consultant/ Legal Adviser at Stephens Scown Solicitors, Exeter, Truro and St. Austell. From 1976 to 1997, he was a partner in Okehampton law firm Burd Pearse.

In 1971, he married Elizabeth Sherwood de la Mare, daughter of the diplomat Sir Arthur de la Mare. They have 4 children and 11 grandchildren.

Lord Burnett was Chairman of Governors at the Plymouth Diocese Catholic Academy Schools Trust until 31 October 2020, is chairman and Trustee of Charitable Giving, and is President of a number of charities including the Royal Marines Association (Tavistock branch), Okehampton Argyle Football Club, Okehampton Small-Bore Association and Dartmoor Search and Rescue Team (Tavistock)

== Political career ==
In 1997, he won the seat of Devon West and Torridge as a Liberal Democrat MP. He succeeded Emma Nicholson as MP for the constituency, after her defection in 1995 from the Conservative Party to the Liberal Democrats, and her elevation as a Liberal Democrat peer. Burnett was re-elected in the 2001 general election.

He was the Liberal Democrats frontbench Spokesperson on Home Affairs from May 1997 – July 2004 and on Justice from July 2004 – May 2005.

Following Burnett's decision to stand down in 2005, there was a swing of 5,000 votes in the 2005 election against Burnett's Liberal Democrat successor as candidate, David Walter. The constituency was reduced in size in a 2006 Boundary Commission re-alignment, and was retained by the Conservative Party.

In April 2006 it was announced that Burnett would be created a life peer to join the Liberal Democrat ranks in the House of Lords, and on 31 May he was created Baron Burnett, of Whitchurch in the County of Devon.

Burnett for much of his 8 years in Parliament had been regarded among his fellow Liberal Democrat MPs as "the cat that walked alone": he distanced himself over his Party's stance on the war in Iraq, for example.

One of the high points of Burnett's parliamentary career was his promotion of the Bill which became the Limited Liability Partnerships Act 2000, allowing solicitors, for example, to remain in the traditional partnership arrangements while having some of the benefits of limited companies.

In the House of Lords, he has spoken primarily on armed forces issues.

Parliament of the United Kingdom
Preceded by Emma Nicholson	Member of Parliament for Torridge and West Devon; 1997–2005	Succeeded by Geoffrey Cox
Orders of precedence in the United Kingdom
Preceded by The Lord Taylor of Holbeach	Gentlemen; Baron Burnett	Followed by The Lord Teverson
