= Castle Drogo =

Country house in Devon, England

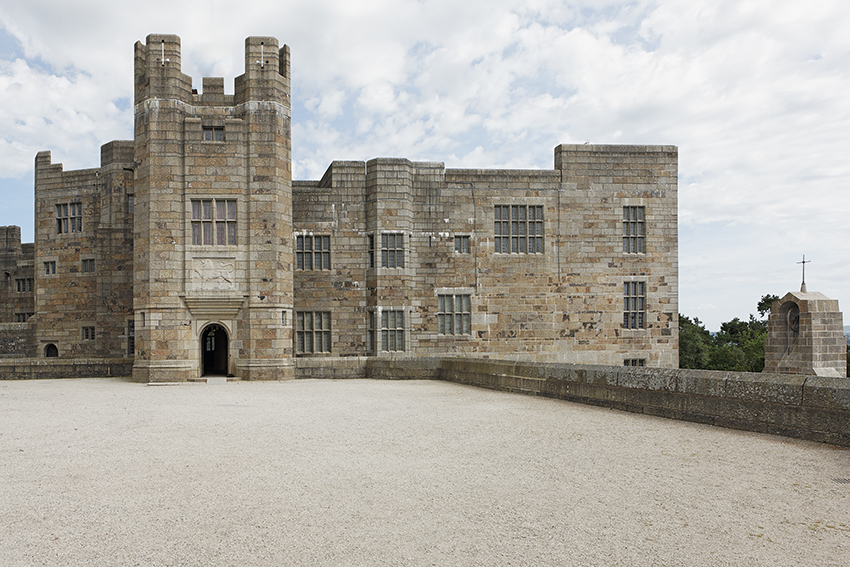
- "Drogo does not pretend to be a castle. It is a castle..."

- Location within Devon
- 50.6960°N 3.8114°W
- Type: House/castle
- Location: Drewsteignton, Devon, England

History
- Built: 1911–1930
- Built for: Julius Drewe

Site notes
- Architect: Edwin Lutyens
- Governing body: National Trust

Listed Building – Grade I
- Official name: Castle Drogo
- Designated: 20 February 1952
- Reference no.: 1106086

Castle Drogo is a country house and mixed-revivalist castle near Drewsteignton, Devon, England. Constructed between 1911 and 1930, it is the last castle built in England. The client was Julius Drewe, the hugely successful founder of the Home and Colonial Stores. Drewe chose the site in the belief that it formed part of the lands of his supposed medieval ancestor, Drogo de Teigne. The architect was Edwin Lutyens, then at the height of his career. Lutyens lamented Drewe's determination to have a castle but nevertheless produced one of his finest buildings. The architectural critic Christopher Hussey described the result: "The ultimate justification of Drogo is that it does not pretend to be a castle. It is a castle, as a castle is built, of granite, on a mountain, in the twentieth century".

The castle was given to the National Trust in 1974, the first building constructed in the twentieth century that the Trust acquired. The castle is a Grade I listed building. The gardens are Grade II* listed on the National Register of Historic Parks and Gardens.

== History ==
In 1910 Julius Drewe bought about 450 acres (1.8 km^{2}) south and west of the village of Drewsteignton in the belief that he was descended from the Drewe family that once lived here. Born Drew, the son of George Smith Drew and his wife Mary, née Peek, both from substantial families of grocers, Drewe added the "e" to his surname later in life. At the age of 18, Drewe was sent to China as a tea-buyer by his uncle, Francis Peek (c.1836–99), a partner in Liverpool tea-merchants Peek and Winch. Julius's great uncle, Richard Peek (1782–1867), one of the three brothers who founded Peek and Winch, was an abolitionist and philanthropist who was on the organising committee of the anti-slavery conventions held in London in 1840 and 1843. The Peek and Winch company later expanded into coffee, cocoa, rubber and spices, and owned plantations in the Dutch East Indies. In 1878, Drewe returned to Liverpool and opened the Willow Pattern Tea Store. In 1883, Drewe and John Musker (1846–1926) founded the Home and Colonial Trading Association (later Home and Colonial Stores), which sold teas selected in India by Drewe, alongside other groceries. By 1903, the company had 500 stores. By the time of his death in 1931 he had bought up an estate of 1,500 acres. Around 1910 he asked Edwin Lutyens to build him a castle. According to his son Basil, he did so on the advice of Edward Hudson, proprietor of Country Life magazine, who was both a patron and a champion of Lutyens. Drewe was now 54 years old, but he still had time, energy and money to create his new family seat. The budget was £50,000 for the castle, and a further £10,000 for the garden. Lutyens wrote privately of his concern over Drewe's ambitions; "I do wish he didn't want a castle but just a delicious loveable house with plenty of good large rooms in it". On 4 April 1911, Drewe's 55th birthday, the first foundation stone was laid.

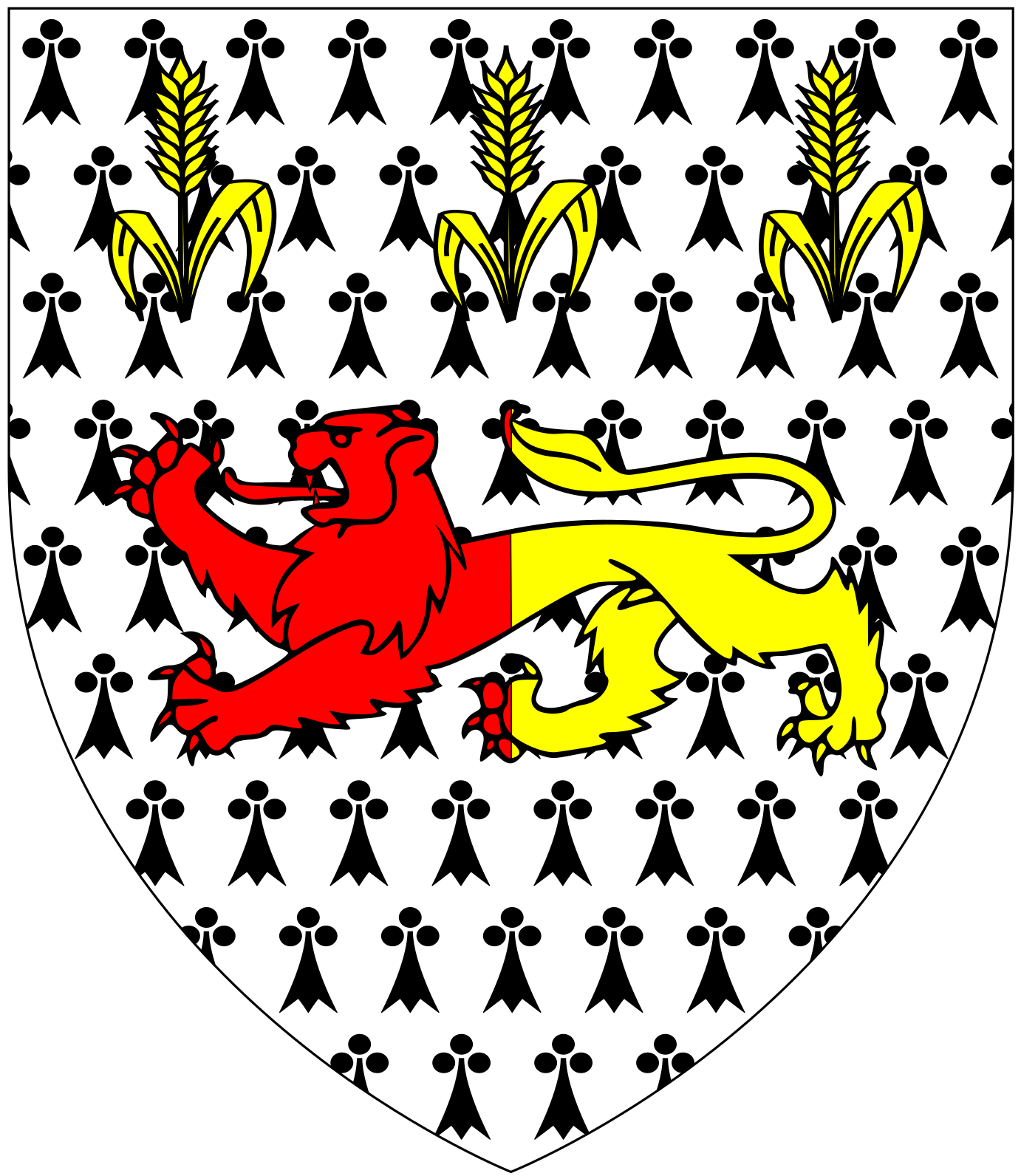
Arms of Drewe of Castle Drogo: Ermine, a lion passant per pale gules and or in chief three ears of wheat stalked and bladed of the last. This is a differenced version of the arms of the Drewe family of Broadhembury, from whom Julius Drewe claimed descent

=== Construction ===
The castle took many years to complete, with the First World War and the economic downturn causing many delays. One reason for the slow progress was the very limited number of craftsmen used. The writer Christopher Hussey records that "after the first year, every stone was laid by two men alone...Devon masons Cleeve and Dewdney". As significant, was Drewe's waning enthusiasm; his son and heir Adrian was killed on 12 July 1917, in early skirmishes prior to the Battle of Passchendaele. Drewe's daughter later recalled, "after my brother's death...the joy of life went out as far as my father and mother were concerned...my father really was somewhat of an invalid afterwards. Overall responsibility for the construction work was held by Drewe's agent, John Coates Walker, described in the most recent guide to the castle as "the unsung hero of the whole venture". Castle Drogo was finally completed in 1930, roughly a third of the size of Lutyens's 1911 designs, and only a year before Julius died; he had, however, been able to live in the house since around 1925. The catalogue prepared for the 1981 exhibition at the Hayward Gallery on Lutyens' work describes Drogo as "one of his finest buildings". It was built at the same time as Lutyens's work in New Delhi, resulting in many similarities in design.

=== Later use ===
After Julius's death, his wife Frances and her son Basil continued to live at the castle. During 1939–45, Frances and her daughter Mary ran the house as a home for babies made homeless during the bombings of London. Frances Drewe died in 1954 and Basil was then joined at Drogo by his son Anthony and his wife. In 1974, Anthony and his son, Dr Christopher Drewe, gave Castle Drogo, Whiddon Farm, several cottages in Drewsteignton, a financial dowry and 600 acres (2.4 km^{2}) of the surrounding land to the National Trust. It was the first 20th-century property the charity acquired. The writer and National Trust administrator James Lees-Milne recorded his impressions of the house and its owners in a diary entry dated 9 September 1976; "Reached Castle Drogo ... at eleven. Very satisfactory house of clean-cut granite. A new family aspiring to, rather arriving at, landed gentry-hood and now the representative living upstairs in a tiny flat, all within my lifetime".

The castle underwent an extensive restoration, starting with the Chapel in 2007, when the new roofing system and window sealing methods were tested. Work began on the main body of the Castle early in 2013, running for nine years. A new visitor centre with shop and café opened in the summer of 2009, after English Heritage required that industrial kitchen equipment such as that used by the previous café within the house, be removed from Grade I listed buildings. In February 2011, the National Trust launched a public appeal for money to fund necessary restoration work.

== Architecture and description ==
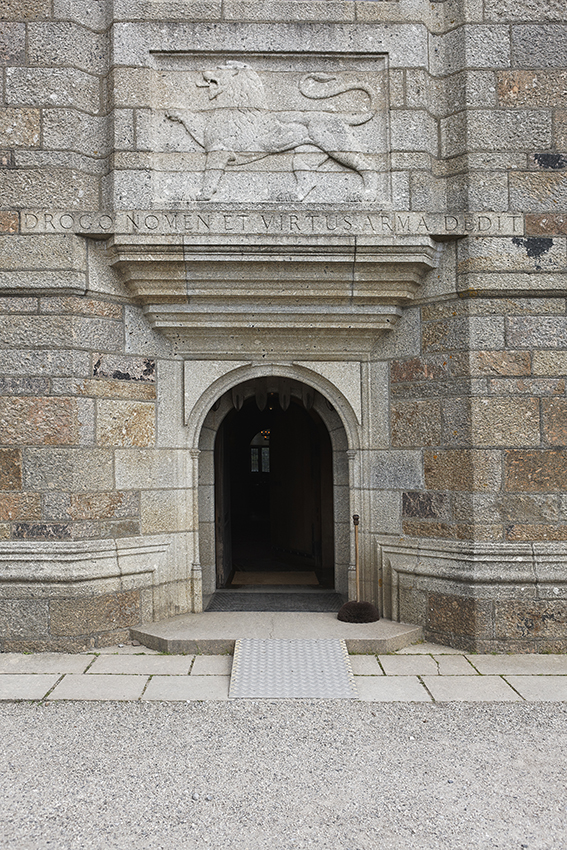
Arms showing lion passant and Motto in sculpted relief above the main entrance

Castle Drogo is the last castle built in England. As constructed, the castle represents approximately one third of the building Lutyens originally planned. The intended building would have run the entire length of the ridge, forming three sides of a large courtyard. The existing structure broadly represents the planned eastern wing of the whole. It was to have been matched by a corresponding wing to the west, the two joined by a northern block enclosing the planned great hall. Drewe balked at the costs, although his own decision to double the thickness of all of the walls on grounds of authenticity was a significant factor in their escalation. Pre-war, the plan for the western wing was abandoned, and after the end of hostilities, which had seen the death of Drewe's eldest son, plans for the great hall were also set aside, with the undercroft, which had been constructed, becoming the crypt chapel.

The castle borrows styles of castle building from the medieval and Tudor periods, along with more minimalist contemporary approaches. A notable feature is the encasement of the service staircase, around which the main staircase climbs. Its defensive characteristics are purely decorative. Additionally, the castle had electricity and lifts from the outset, with power being supplied by two turbines on the river below. The castle is a Grade I listed building.

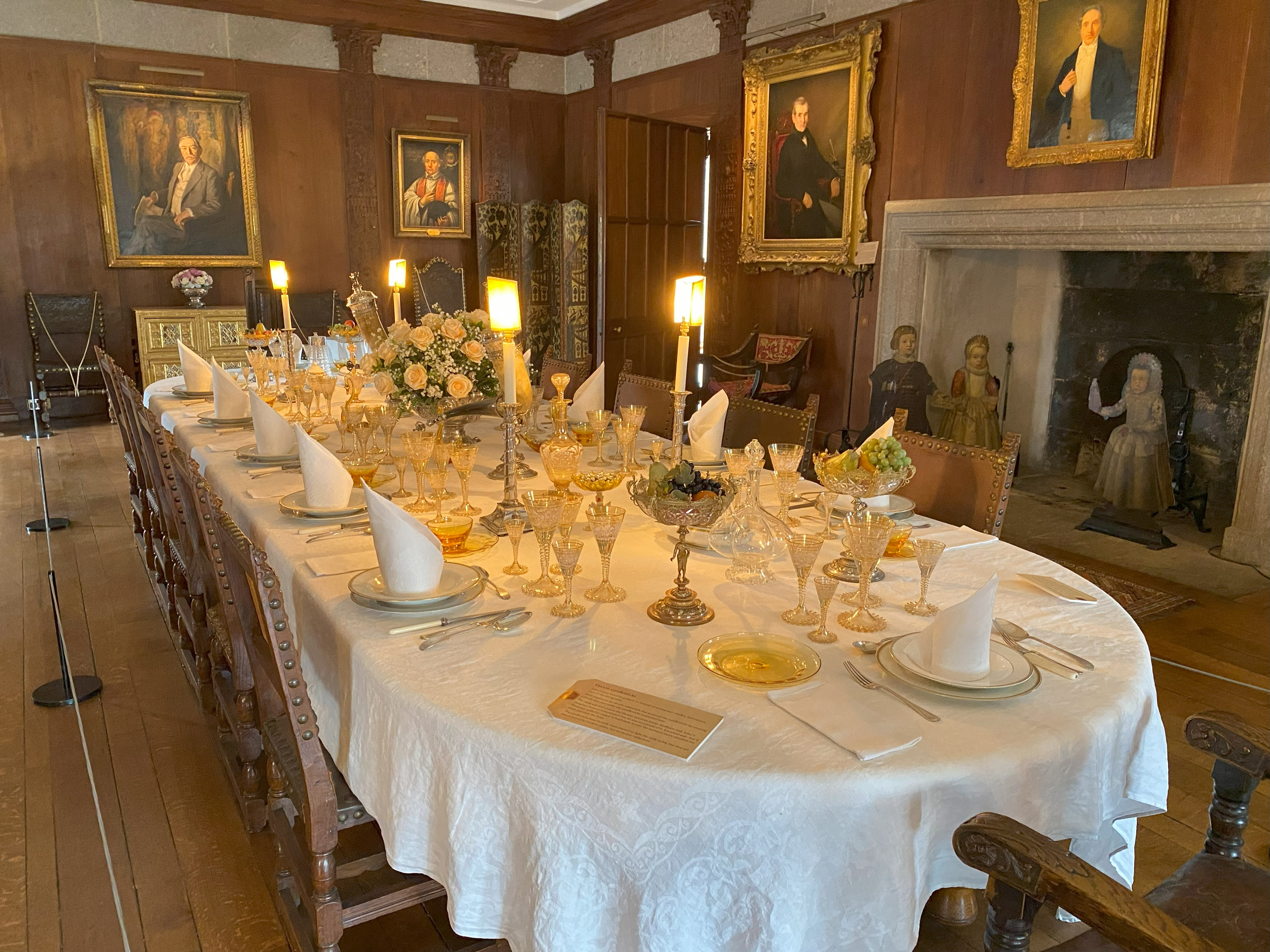
Dining Room of Castle Drogo

=== Exterior ===
The castle essentially comprises a three-storey main block, with a four-storey family and service wing to the side.

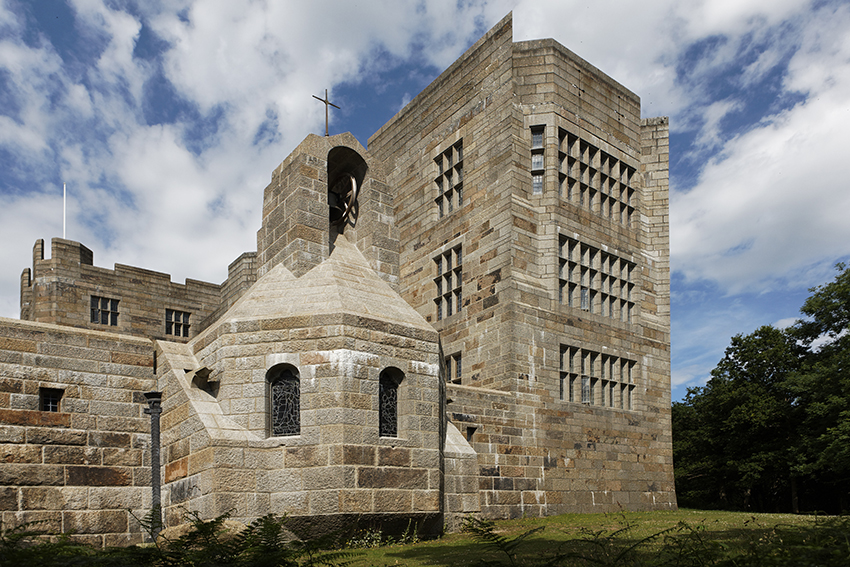
Chapel & south façade of house

=== Interior ===
The main block comprises four reception rooms, the hall, the library, the dining room and the drawing room.

== Gardens ==
The castle has a formal garden, designed by Lutyens with planting by George Dillistone, which contrasts with its setting on the edge of Dartmoor. In 1915, Lutyens brought in Gertrude Jekyll to assist with the planning. Jekyll's involvement appears to have been limited to designing the planting for the approach to the castle along the drive. The garden is noted for its rhododendrons and magnolias, herbaceous borders, rose garden, shrub garden and circular grass tennis court now used for croquet. The gardens are Grade II* listed.

== Climate ==
Climate data for Castle Drogo, 1981–2010 normals
Month	Jan	Feb	Mar	Apr	May	Jun	Jul	Aug	Sep	Oct	Nov	Dec	Year
Mean daily maximum °C (°F)	7 (45)	7 (45)	9 (48)	12 (54)	15 (59)	18 (64)	20 (68)	20 (68)	17 (63)	13 (55)	10 (50)	8 (46)	13.0 (55.4)
Mean daily minimum °C (°F)	1 (34)	1 (34)	2 (36)	3 (37)	6 (43)	9 (48)	11 (52)	10 (50)	8 (46)	6 (43)	3 (37)	2 (36)	5.2 (41.4)
Average precipitation mm (inches)	151.8 (5.98)	115.2 (4.54)	112.5 (4.43)	90.9 (3.58)	95.2 (3.75)	77.5 (3.05)	84.7 (3.33)	88.2 (3.47)	101.8 (4.01)	153.1 (6.03)	148.4 (5.84)	167.2 (6.58)	1,386.5 (54.59)
Source: Chelsa Climate

== Sources ==
- Amery, Colin; and, others (1982). Lutyens, the work of the English architect Sir Edwin Lutyens (1869–1944). London UK: Arts Council of Great Britain. ISBN 9-7807287-0304-9.
- Aslet, Clive (1982). The Last Country Houses. New Haven, Connecticut, USA and London, UK: Yale University Press. ISBN 0-300-02904-7.
- Brown, Jane (1982). Gardens of a Golden Afternoon. London UK: Penguin Books. ISBN 9-780670-80640-9.
- Brown, Jane (1997). Lutyens and the Edwardians. London UK: Penguin Books. ISBN 9-780140-24269-0.
- Cherry, Bridget; Pevsner, Nikolaus (2004). Devon. The Buildings of England. New Haven, Connecticut, USA and London UK: Yale University Press. ISBN 0-300-09596-1.
- de Moubray, Amicia (2013). Twentieth Century Castles in Britain. London, UK: Frances Lincoln Publishers. ISBN 978-0-7112-3178-8.
- Evans, Siân (2009). Castle Drogo. Swindon, UK: National Trust Enterprises. ISBN 978-1-84359-360-7.
- Franklin, Jill (1981). The Gentleman's Country House and its Plan 1835–1914. London, UK: Routledge & Kegan Paul. ISBN 0-7100-0622-5. "The Gentleman's Country House and its Plan 1835–1914."
- Greeves, Lydia (2008). Houses of the National Trust. London, UK: National Trust Books. ISBN 9-7819054-0066-9.
- Hussey, Christopher (1950). The Life of Sir Edwin Lutyens. London UK: Antique Collectors' Club. ISBN 9-780907-46259-0.
- Lees-Milne, James (1998). Through Wood And Dale: Diaries, 1975-1978. London UK: John Murray. ISBN 0-7195-5599-X.
- Lutyens, Mary (1980). Edwin Lutyens. London UK: John Murray. ISBN 0-7195-3777-0. OCLC 831339925.
- Ridley, Jane (2003). Edwin Lutyens: His Life, His Wife, His Work. London, UK: Pimlico. ISBN 0-7126-6822-5.
