= Torrington (constituency) =

Former parliamentary constituency in the United Kingdom

- Former borough constituency for the House of Commons

1295–1372
- Seats: two

Devon, Torrington
- Former county constituency for the House of Commons

1950–February 1974
- Seats: one
- Created from: South Molton and Barnstaple
- Replaced by: North Devon, Tiverton & West Devon

Torrington was a county constituency centred on the town of Torrington in Devon. It returned one Member of Parliament (MP) to the House of Commons of the Parliament of the United Kingdom from 1950 until it was abolished for the February 1974 general election.

An earlier constituency called Torrington, a parliamentary borough consisting only of the town itself, returned members to some of the parliaments of the Middle Ages; it was not represented after 1372.

== Boundaries ==
The Municipal Boroughs of Bideford, Great Torrington, and Okehampton, the Urban Districts of Crediton and Northam, and the Rural Districts of Bideford, Crediton, Okehampton, and Torrington.

== History ==
=== The medieval borough ===
Torrington, sometimes referred to as Chipping Torrington, was one of a number of English boroughs that were represented in Parliament only intermittently during the Middle Ages, and eventually lost the right completely; at this period, writs of election were directed to the sheriff of each county, and it was left to their discretion which towns were summoned to send burgesses. Torrington is unusual, however, in that clear evidence of its reluctance to return members survives - the cost of supporting its two MPs was considered much too detrimental to be offset by any benefits that came from being represented. Late in the reign of Edward III, the townsmen of Torrington petitioned the king

That they ought not to be so burdened with sending men, neither did they send any before the 21st of his reign, when the Sheriff maliciously returned into the Chancery, that the said town was a Borough, and so, from that year, by Pretext of the said Return, the town has been many times put to great pains and expenses, to their no small grievance and damage, and manifest impoverishing.

The petition was not entirely accurate, for Torrington had sent members to some 17 parliaments before the sheriff's "malicious" action, although it was true that the town was not represented in the three immediately preceding that date. The King accepted the petition, and granted Torrington a Patent of Exemption from being required to send members to Parliament; yet, notwithstanding this, they were called upon again to send MPs to two Parliaments in the next three years. After this, however, Torrington's name appears no more on the list of boroughs.

As time passed, and the benefits of representation in Parliament became more obvious, the town repented of its earlier action. Around three centuries later, at the time of the Restoration of Charles II, Torrington petitioned to be restored to its ancient rights and allowed once more to return Members of Parliament. The petition was unavailing.

=== The modern county constituency ===
A new Torrington constituency was created by the Representation of the People Act 1948 as part of the boundary changes that came into effect at the general election of 1950. It was a county constituency, one of six in Devon, and covered central and western parts of the county. Though named after Great Torrington, its largest town was Bideford.

The constituency was a highly rural one dominated by farming, and was assumed to be an entirely safe seat for the Conservatives and their allies. However, when George Lambert (who had won the seat three times with large majorities) inherited a peerage in 1958, the resulting by-election was sensationally won by Mark Bonham-Carter for the Liberals, the first sign of the Liberals' national revival which continued at other by-elections across the country over the next fifteen years. The Conservatives recaptured the seat at the following year's general election, and retained it for the remainder of its existence, but it remained marginal until the 1970 general election.

The Torrington constituency was abolished with effect from the February 1974 general election (at which Devon's county constituencies were reduced by one) being divided between the revised North Devon and Tiverton constituencies and the new West Devon.

== Members of Parliament ==
Election	Member	Party
1950	George Lambert	National Liberal
1958 by-election	Mark Bonham-Carter	Liberal
1959	Percy Browne	Conservative
1964	Peter Mills	Conservative
1974	constituency abolished	

== Election results ==
=== Elections in the 1950s ===
General election 1950: Torrington
Party	Candidate	Votes	%	±%
National Liberal	George Lambert	19,128	51.07	
Liberal	Elizabeth Rashleigh	9,589	25.60	
Labour	Thomas B.H. Chappell	8,735	23.32	
Majority		9,539	25.47	
Turnout		37,452	83.16	
National Liberal win (new seat)				

General election 1951: Torrington
Party	Candidate	Votes	%	±%
National Liberal	George Lambert	23,162	66.23	+15.16
Labour	GR Sargeant	11,812	33.77	+10.45
Majority		11,350	32.46	+6.99
Turnout		34,974	76.41	
National Liberal hold		Swing		

General election 1955: Torrington
Party	Candidate	Votes	%	±%
National Liberal	George Lambert	20,124	65.05	−1.18
Labour	Leonard Lamb	10,812	34.95	+1.18
Majority		9,312	30.10	−2.36
Turnout		30,936	69.20	−7.20
National Liberal hold		Swing		

1958 Torrington by-election
Party	Candidate	Votes	%	±%
Liberal	Mark Bonham-Carter	13,408	37.99	New
Conservative	Anthony Royle	13,189	37.37	−27.68
Labour	Leonard Lamb	8,697	24.64	−10.31
Majority		219	0.62	N/A
Turnout		35,294		
Liberal gain from National Liberal		Swing		

General election 1959: Torrington
Party	Candidate	Votes	%	±%
Conservative	Percy Browne	17,283	45.56	−19.49
Liberal	Mark Bonham-Carter	15,018	39.59	N/A
Labour	Raymond Dobson	5,633	14.85	−20.10
Majority		2,265	5.97	−24.13
Turnout		37,934	86.16	
Conservative hold		Swing		

=== Elections in the 1960s ===
General election 1964: Torrington
Party	Candidate	Votes	%	±%
Conservative	Peter Mills	16,899	44.94	−0.62
Liberal	Mark Bonham-Carter	14,831	39.45	−0.14
Labour	David Owen	5,867	15.60	+0.65
Majority		2,068	5.49	−0.46
Turnout		37,597	85.11	−1.05
Conservative hold		Swing	-0.24	

General election 1966: Torrington
Party	Candidate	Votes	%	±%
Conservative	Peter Mills	17,912	47.04	+2.10
Liberal	Lewis Anthony Lacey	14,260	37.46	−1.99
Labour	A Frank Paton	5,891	15.48	−0.12
Majority		3,652	9.58	+4.09
Turnout		38,063	85.78	+0.67
Conservative hold		Swing	+2.05	

=== Elections in the 1970s ===
General election 1970: Torrington
Party	Candidate	Votes	%	±%
Conservative	Peter Mills	21,328	54.03	+6.99
Liberal	Lewis Anthony Lacey	11,455	29.02	–8.44
Labour	Terence Kendrick Marston	6,695	16.96	+1.48
Majority		9,873	25.01	+15.43
Turnout		39,478	80.73	–5.05
Conservative hold		Swing	+7.72	

== Bibliography ==
- Charles Henry Parry, The Parliaments and Councils of England (London: John Murray, 1839)
- Edward Porritt and Annie G Porritt, The Unreformed House of Commons (Cambridge University Press, 1903)
- Frederic A Youngs, jr, Guide to the Local Administrative Units of England, Vol I (London: Royal Historical Society, 1979)
- Leigh Rayment's Historical List of MPs – Constituencies beginning with "T" (part 2)
