= South Molton (constituency) =

Former parliamentary constituency in the United Kingdom

- Former county constituency for the House of Commons

1885–1950
- Seats: one
- Created from: North Devon
- Replaced by: Torrington and North Devon

South Molton was a parliamentary constituency centred on the small town of South Molton in Devon, in the South West of England. It returned one Member of Parliament (MP) to the House of Commons of the Parliament of the United Kingdom.

The constituency was created for the 1885 general election, and abolished for the 1950 general election, when it was largely replaced by Torrington.

== Boundaries ==
1885–1918: The Municipal Borough of South Molton, and the Sessional Divisions of Crediton, Great Torrington, and South Molton.

1918–1950: The Municipal Boroughs of Great Torrington, Okehampton, and South Molton, the Urban District of Crediton, and the Rural Districts of Crediton, Okehampton, South Molton, and Torrington.

== Members of Parliament ==
George Lambert

Election	Member	Party
1885	Newton Wallop	Liberal
1886	Newton Wallop	Liberal Unionist
1891	George Lambert	Liberal
1924	Cedric Drewe	Unionist
1929	George Lambert	Liberal
1931	George Lambert	Liberal National
1945	George Lambert jnr.	National Liberal
1950	constituency abolished	

== Election results ==
=== Elections in the 1880s ===
General election 1885: South Molton
Party	Candidate	Votes	%	±%
Liberal	Newton Wallop	4,925	62.7	
Conservative	Walter Rodolph Trefusis	2,924	37.3	
Majority		2,001	25.4	
Turnout		7,849	84.0	
Registered electors		9,343		
Liberal win (new seat)				

General election 1886: South Molton
Party	Candidate	Votes	%	±%
Liberal Unionist	Newton Wallop	4,041	63.2	+25.9
Liberal	William Heap Walker	2,352	36.8	−25.9
Majority		1,689	26.4	N/A
Turnout		6,393	68.4	−15.6
Registered electors		9,343		
Liberal Unionist gain from Liberal		Swing	+25.9	

=== Elections in the 1890s ===
Viscount Lymington was elevated to the peerage, becoming Earl of Portsmouth, causing a by-election.

By-election, 13 Nov 1891: South Molton
Party	Candidate	Votes	%	±%
Liberal	George Lambert	4,222	58.4	+21.6
Liberal Unionist	Charles William Buller	3,010	41.6	−21.6
Majority		1,212	16.8	N/A
Turnout		7,232	83.0	+14.6
Registered electors		8,712		
Liberal gain from Liberal Unionist		Swing	+21.6	

General election 1892: South Molton
Party	Candidate	Votes	%	±%
Liberal	George Lambert	4,278	59.3	+22.5
Conservative	Richard Moore-Stevens	2,939	40.7	−22.5
Majority		1,339	18.6	N/A
Turnout		7,217	82.6	+14.2
Registered electors		8,737		
Liberal gain from Liberal Unionist		Swing	+22.5	

General election 1895: South Molton
Party	Candidate	Votes	%	±%
Liberal	George Lambert	4,283	59.4	+0.1
Liberal Unionist	James J. Long	2,923	40.6	−0.1
Majority		1,360	18.8	+0.2
Turnout		7,206	83.2	+0.6
Registered electors		8,662		
Liberal hold		Swing	+0.1	

=== Elections in the 1900s ===
General election January 1900: South Molton
Party	Candidate	Votes	%	±%
Liberal	George Lambert	Unopposed		
Liberal hold				

General election January 1906: South Molton
Party	Candidate	Votes	%	±%
Liberal	George Lambert	Unopposed		
Liberal hold				

=== Elections in the 1910s ===
George Lambert

General election January 1910: South Molton
Party	Candidate	Votes	%	±%
Liberal	George Lambert	4,419	56.5	N/A
Liberal Unionist	John Perowne	3,398	43.5	New
Majority		1,021	13.0	N/A
Turnout		7,817	89.9	N/A
Registered electors		8,700		
Liberal hold		Swing	N/A	

General election December 1910: South Molton
Party	Candidate	Votes	%	±%
Liberal	George Lambert	4,224	56.8	+0.3
Liberal Unionist	John Perowne	3,217	43.2	−0.3
Majority		1,007	13.6	+0.6
Turnout		7,441	85.5	−4.4
Registered electors		8,700		
Liberal hold		Swing	+0.3	

General Election 1914–15: Another General Election was required to take place before the end of 1915. The political parties had been making preparations for an election to take place from 1914 and by the end of this year, the following candidates had been selected;

- Liberal: George Lambert,
- Conservative:

George Lambert

General election 1918: South Molton
Party		Candidate	Votes	%	±%
	Liberal	George Lambert	10,424	56.3	−0.5
C	Unionist	Herbert Sparkes	8,093	43.7	+0.5
Majority			2,331	12.6	−1.0
Turnout			18,517	65.8	−19.7
	Liberal hold		Swing	−0.5	
C indicates candidate endorsed by the coalition government.

=== Elections in the 1920s ===
General election 1922: South Molton
Party	Candidate	Votes	%	±%
Liberal	George Lambert	Unopposed	N/A	N/A
Liberal hold				

General election 1923: South Molton
Party	Candidate	Votes	%	±%
Liberal	George Lambert	Unopposed	N/A	N/A
Liberal hold				

General election 1924: South Molton
Party	Candidate	Votes	%	±%
Unionist	Cedric Drewe	12,811	51.3	New
Liberal	George Lambert	12,157	48.7	N/A
Majority		654	2.6	N/A
Turnout		24,968	85.3	N/A
Unionist gain from Liberal		Swing		

General election 1929: South Molton
Party	Candidate	Votes	%	±%
Liberal	George Lambert	15,072	48.1	−0.6
Unionist	Cedric Drewe	13,567	43.2	−8.1
Labour	Rudolph Putnam Messel	2,731	8.7	New
Majority		1,505	4.9	N/A
Turnout		31,370	87.4	+2.1
Liberal gain from Unionist		Swing	+3.8	

=== Elections in the 1930s ===
General election 1931: South Molton
Party	Candidate	Votes	%	±%
National Liberal	George Lambert	25,700	88.0	+39.9
Labour	Rudolph Putnam Messel	3,499	12.0	+3.3
Majority		22,201	76.0	+71.1
Turnout		29,199	81.0	−6.4
National Liberal hold		Swing		

General election 1935: South Molton
Party	Candidate	Votes	%	±%
National Liberal	George Lambert	20,767	78.7	−9.3
Labour	H F Chilcott	5,610	21.3	+9.3
Majority		15,157	57.4	−12.6
Turnout		26,377	72.9	−8.1
National Liberal hold		Swing		

=== Elections in the 1940s ===
General Election 1939–40: Another General Election was required to take place before the end of 1940. The political parties had been making preparations for an election to take place from 1939 and by the end of this year, the following candidates had been selected;

- Liberal National: George Lambert

General election 1945: South Molton
Party	Candidate	Votes	%	±%
National Liberal	George Lambert	19,065	67.6	−11.1
Labour	C Lang	9,140	32.4	+11.1
Majority		9,925	35.2	−22.2
Turnout		28,205	71.9	−1.0
National Liberal hold		Swing		
