= South West Devon =

UK Parliament constituency (since 1997)

Coordinates: 50.395°N 3.992°W

- County constituency for the House of Commons
- Interactive map of boundaries since 2024
- Map of constituency within South West England
- County: Devon
- Electorate: 75,731 (2023)
- Major settlements: Plympton, Plymstock and Ivybridge

Current constituency
- Member of Parliament: Rebecca Smith (Conservative)
- Seats: One
- Created from: Plymouth Sutton, South Hams

South West Devon is a constituency (Note: A county constituency (for the purposes of election expenses and type of returning officer)) represented by Rebecca Smith, a Conservative, since 2024. (Note: As with all constituencies, the constituency elects one Member of Parliament (MP) by the first past the post system of election at least every five years.)

== Constituency profile ==
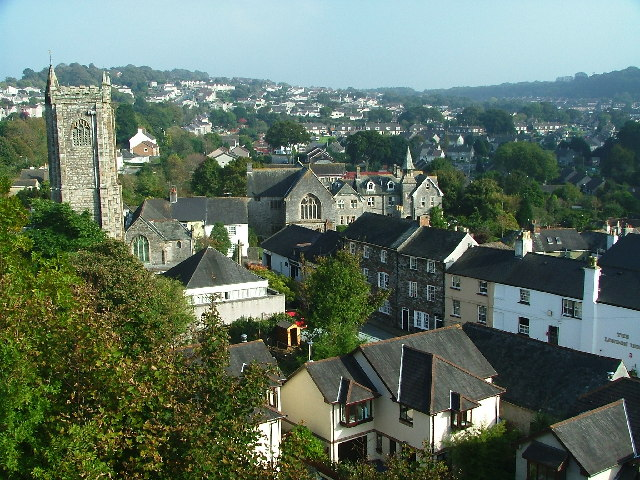
Plympton

South West Devon is a constituency in Devon in South West England, covering parts of the City of Plymouth, South Hams and West Devon districts. It includes the Plymouth suburbs of Plympton and Plymstock, the town of Ivybridge and the villages of Yelverton and Yealmpton.

Plympton and Plymstock serve as commuter suburbs for Plymouth and are both located around 3 miles (4.8 km) east of the city centre. Plymstock was a rural area that was developed for housing after World War II, whilst Plympton was traditionally an important stannary town and seaport in its own right. Both suburbs are affluent and consist mostly of semi-detached housing. The rest of the constituency is rural and covers an area of rolling hills and small villages between the upland moors of Dartmoor and the English Channel coast. This area has a history of kaolinite and tin mining and has average levels of wealth. Like Plymstock, Ivybridge is a rural settlement which experienced rapid suburban expansion in the late 20th century. House prices across the constituency are generally lower than the regional and UK averages.

South West Devon has a low proportion of young adults and a large retired population. Residents have above-average rates of income, high levels of homeownership, and the child poverty rate is low. They have average levels of education and a high proportion work in the retail, manufacturing and agriculture sectors. The percentage claiming unemployment benefits is around half the UK-wide rate. White people made up 98% of the population at the 2021 census.

At the local council level, Ivybridge and the rural areas are mostly represented by Liberal Democrats, Plymstock by the Labour Party and Plympton by independents. An estimated 55% of voters in South West Devon supported leaving the European Union in the 2016 referendum, marginally higher than the UK-wide figure of 52%.

== Boundaries ==
Map of boundaries from 2010 to 2024

1997–2010: The District of South Hams wards of Bickleigh and Shaugh, Brixton, Charterlands, Cornwood and Harford, Erme Valley, Ivybridge, Modbury, Newton and Noss, Sparkwell, Ugborough, Wembury, and Yealmpton, the City of Plymouth wards of Plympton Erle, Plympton St Mary, Plymstock Dunstone, and Plymstock Radford, and the Borough of West Devon ward of Buckland Monachorum.

2010–2024: The District of South Hams wards of Bickleigh and Shaugh, Charterlands, Cornwood and Sparkwell, Erme Valley, Ivybridge Central, Ivybridge Filham, Ivybridge Woodlands, Newton and Noss, Wembury and Brixton, and Yealmpton, and the City of Plymouth wards of Plympton Chaddlewood, Plympton Erle, Plympton St Mary, Plymstock Dunstone, and Plymstock Radford.

The constituency is a south-western portion of Devon and includes the easternmost part of the city of Plymouth, namely the suburban small towns of Plympton (which as the borough constituency of Plympton Erle returned its own MPs until the Reform Act 1832 abolished the seat as a 'rotten borough') and Plymstock which are so close as to be contiguous with the city's eastern parts, as well as the town of Ivybridge and much of the South Hams. Its landscape includes the edge of Dartmoor and a southern coastline.

2024-present: Further to the 2023 review of Westminster constituencies, enacted by the Parliamentary Constituencies Order 2023, from the 2024 general election, the constituency will be composed of the following (as they existed on 1 December 2020):

- The City of Plymouth wards of: Plympton Chaddlewood; Plympton Erle; Plympton St. Mary; Plymstock Dunstone; Plymstock Radford.
- The District of South Hams wards of: Bickleigh & Cornwood; Ermington & Ugborough; Ivybridge East; Ivybridge West; Newton & Yealmpton; Wembury & Brixton; Woolwell.
- The Borough of West Devon wards of: Buckland Monachorum; Burrator.

Minor changes including the gain of the two West Devon Borough wards from Torridge and West Devon and the loss of the Charterlands ward in the east to the newly named constituency of South Devon.

== History ==
The areas covered in the seat were previously served by the South Hams and Plymouth Sutton seats. Both seats had been represented by the Conservative Party, and Gary Streeter, who became the first MP for the new constituency in 1997, had been MP for Plymouth Sutton from 1992 until 1997.

== Members of Parliament ==
Election	Member	Party
1997	Gary Streeter	Conservative
2024	Rebecca Smith	Conservative

== Elections ==
=== Elections in the 2020s ===
General election 2024: South West Devon
Party	Candidate	Votes	%	±%
Conservative	Rebecca Smith	17,916	34.3	−28.3
Labour	Sarah Allen	15,804	30.3	+8.9
Reform	Stephen Horner	9,361	17.9	N/A
Liberal Democrats	Julian Brazil	5,551	10.6	−1.5
Green	Lauren McLay	2,925	5.6	+1.7
Independent	Alan Spencer	438	0.8	N/A
TUSC	Ben Davy	141	0.3	N/A
Heritage	Darryl Ingram	106	0.2	N/A
Majority		2,112	4.0	−36.2
Turnout		52,242	66.5	−7.9
Registered electors		77,600		
Conservative hold		Swing	−18.6	

=== Elections in the 2010s ===
2019 notional result
Party	Vote	%
Conservative	35,102	62.6
Labour	12,012	21.4
Liberal Democrats	6,807	12.1
Green	2,179	3.9
Turnout	56,100	74.4
Electorate	75,371	

General election 2019: South West Devon
Party	Candidate	Votes	%	±%
Conservative	Gary Streeter	33,286	62.4	+2.6
Labour	Alex Beverley	11,856	22.2	−7.7
Liberal Democrats	Sima Davarian	6,207	11.6	+6.4
Green	Ian Poyser	2,018	3.8	+1.7
Majority		21,430	40.2	+10.3
Turnout		53,367	73.6	−0.4
Registered electors		72,535		
Conservative hold		Swing	+5.15	

General election 2017: South West Devon
Party	Candidate	Votes	%	±%
Conservative	Gary Streeter	31,634	59.8	+3.2
Labour Co-op	Philippa Davey	15,818	29.9	+13.2
Liberal Democrats	Caroline Voaden	2,732	5.2	−2.3
UKIP	Ian Ross	1,540	2.9	−11.6
Green	Win Scutt	1,133	2.1	−2.7
Majority		15,816	29.9	−10.0
Turnout		52,857	74.0	+3.1
Conservative hold		Swing	−5.0	

General election 2015: South West Devon
Party	Candidate	Votes	%	±%
Conservative	Gary Streeter	28,500	56.6	+0.6
Labour	Chaz Singh	8,391	16.7	+4.3
UKIP	Robin Julian	7,306	14.5	+8.3
Liberal Democrats	Tom Davies	3,767	7.5	−16.6
Green	Win Scutt	2,408	4.8	+3.5
Majority		20,109	39.9	+8.0
Turnout		50,372	70.9	−0.3
Conservative hold		Swing	+0.6	

General election 2010: South West Devon
Party	Candidate	Votes	%	±%
Conservative	Gary Streeter	27,908	56.0	+11.6
Liberal Democrats	Anna Pascoe	12,034	24.1	+0.3
Labour	Luke Pollard	6,193	12.4	−11.8
UKIP	Hugh Williams	3,084	6.2	−1.3
Green	Vaughan Brean	641	1.3	N/A
Majority		15,874	31.9	+11.2
Turnout		49,860	71.2	+2.9
Conservative hold		Swing	+5.6	

=== Elections in the 2000s ===
General election 2005: South West Devon
Party	Candidate	Votes	%	±%
Conservative	Gary Streeter	21,906	44.8	−2.0
Liberal Democrats	Judy Evans	11,765	24.1	+5.7
Labour	Christopher Mavin	11,545	23.6	−8.0
UKIP	Hugh Williams	3,669	7.5	+4.3
Majority		10,141	20.7	+5.5
Turnout		48,885	68.6	+2.5
Conservative hold		Swing	−3.8	

General election 2001: South West Devon
Party	Candidate	Votes	%	±%
Conservative	Gary Streeter	21,970	46.8	+3.9
Labour	Christopher Mavin	14,826	31.6	+2.7
Liberal Democrats	Phil Hutty	8,616	18.4	−5.4
UKIP	Roger Bullock	1,492	3.2	+2.3
Majority		7,144	15.2	+1.2
Turnout		46,904	66.1	−10.1
Conservative hold		Swing		

=== Elections in the 1990s ===
General election 1997: South West Devon
Party	Candidate	Votes	%	±%
Conservative	Gary Streeter	22,659	42.9	
Labour	Christopher Mavin	15,262	28.9	
Liberal Democrats	Keith Baldry	12,542	23.8	
Referendum	Robert Saddler	1,668	3.2	
UKIP	H.M. King	491	0.9	
Natural Law	Jon Hyde	159	0.3	
Majority		7,397	14.0	
Turnout		52,781	76.2	
Conservative win (new seat)				

== See also ==
- Parliamentary constituencies in Devon
