= Adaptability and Partnership: Issues for the Strategic Defence Review =

- Author: Government of the United Kingdom
- Language: English
- Genre: Defence green paper
- Publisher: Ministry of Defence (United Kingdom)
- Publication date: 2010
- Publication place: United Kingdom
- Pages: 52 pp.
- ISBN: 978-0-10-177942-5
- Preceded by: 1998 Defence green paper

Adaptability and Partnership: Issues for the Strategic Defence Review is a government of the United Kingdom green paper released on 2 February 2010. The publication sets out the framework for the Strategic Defence and Security Review 2010 (SDSR) which seeks to provide guidance for UK's options for the future shape of Britain's armed forces.

== Background ==
The Green Paper on the Strategic Defence Review (SDR) posing fundamental questions for the next government after this year's 2010 general election on how it will restructure the armed forces, given the pressure on the UK public finances. This British policy document is the product of consultation within the Defence community headed by former Secretary of State for Defence and Secretary General of NATO George Robertson. It has been informed by “members of the Defence Advisory Forum, including opposition politicians, former military personnel and academics.”

== Key elements ==
Adaptability and Partnership: Issues for the Strategic Defence Review was based around assumptions threats to UK's national security have changed dramatically and that British military must also prepare for the threats of the future.

Following 1998 Green Paper, the publication analyses “the wide range of potential threats to the UK, including terrorism, nuclear states, cyberwarfare, resource scarcity and climate change.” It also reflects on the lessons learned in Iraq and Afghanistan. The Green Paper concludes that in order to effectively employ the Armed Forces in support of wider efforts to prevent conflict and strengthen international stability, they must become “more flexible and adaptable, and better able to respond quickly as and when new threats emerge.” For the first time, Government admits that UK can not defend itself inside - or on - its borders alone. The Armed Forces' role must be complemented by close relationships - even “further integration” - with those of key allies and partners in Europe (especially France) as well as the US. An “integrated civil-military approach including defence, diplomatic and development efforts” is recommended. Several propositions have been suggested:

- Sharing agreement between Royal Navy and Marine Nationale of one of the Queen Elizabeth-class aircraft carrier;
- Scrapping of the British replacement of the Trident system.

== Reception ==
In the wake of the release of the Green Paper Labour MP and member of the Defence Select Committee Linda Gilroy visited a French corvette docked at HMNB Devonport and said “I'll be interested to learn more about the French Navy, particularly how they make use of larger numbers of smaller and more basic frigates and what lessons we can learn for own next generation frigate programme.”
