= Gary Streeter =

British Conservative politician (born 1955)

Sir Gary Streeter
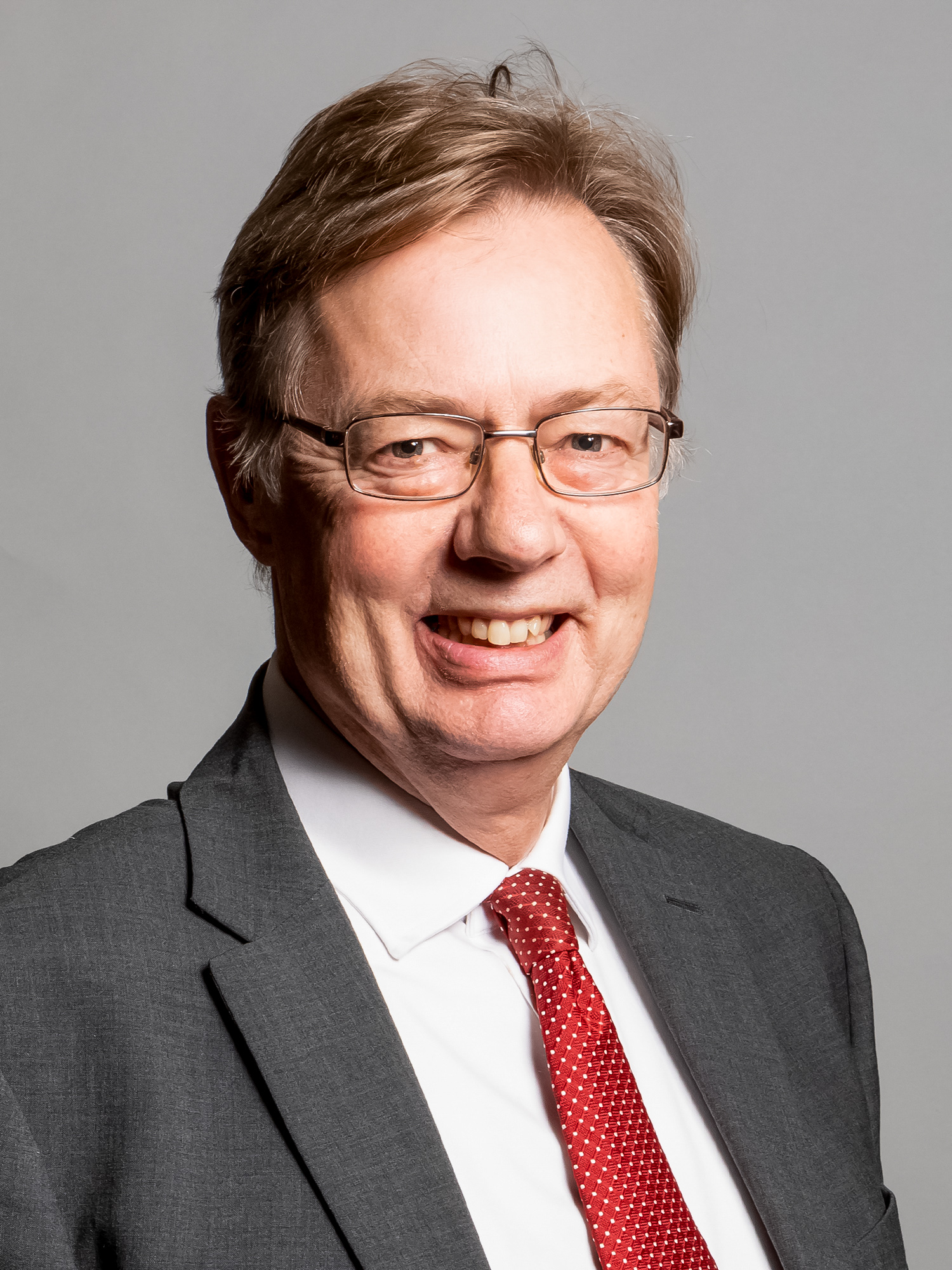
- Official portrait, 2020

Shadow Secretary of State for International Development
- In office 1 June 1998 – 18 September 2001
- Leader: William Hague
- Preceded by: Alastair Goodlad
- Succeeded by: Caroline Spelman

Parliamentary Secretary to the Lord Chancellor's Department
- In office 2 June 1996 – 1 May 1997
- Prime Minister: John Major
- Preceded by: Jonathan Evans
- Succeeded by: Geoff Hoon

Member of Parliament for South West Devon
- In office 1 May 1997 – 30 May 2024
- Preceded by: Constituency established
- Succeeded by: Rebecca Smith

Member of Parliament for Plymouth Sutton
- In office 9 April 1992 – 8 April 1997
- Preceded by: Alan Clark
- Succeeded by: Linda Gilroy

Personal details
- Born: Gary Nicholas Streeter; 2 October 1955 (age 71) Gosport, England
- Party: Conservative (since 1988)
- Other political affiliations: SDP (before 1988)
- Spouse: Janet Stevens (m. 1978)
- Children: 2
- Education: King's College London
- Profession: Solicitor
- Website: garystreeter.co.uk

Sir Gary Nicholas Streeter (born 2 October 1955) is a Conservative Party politician in the United Kingdom. He served as a Member of Parliament (MP) for over 30 years, representing South West Devon from its creation in 1997 to 2024, and previously holding its main predecessor seat of Plymouth Sutton, from which the majority its electorate was taken, between 1992 and 1997. During the Fifty-fifth Parliament, Streeter had been the longest-serving MP representing a constituency in the county of Devon.

== Early life ==
Streeter attended Tiverton Grammar School, Tiverton, Devon, where he was head boy from 1972 to 1973, then King's College London, where he gained a first-class honours law degree. From 1984 to 1998, he was a solicitor and partner at Foot and Bowden (now called Foot Anstey) in Plymouth, where he specialised in company and employment law. In 1998 Streeter was fined £1,000 by the Law Society for conduct unbecoming a solicitor due to a conflict of interest when dealing with a business merger in 1991 while with Foot Bowden Limited.

Streeter's initial political experience was as a councillor on Plymouth City Council, where he represented Mount Gould ward from 1986 to 1992. Having been elected to serve as a member of the Social Democratic Party (SDP), in January 1988 he defected to the Conservative Party. Reflecting on his career in an interview with the Plymouth Evening Herald years later, Streeter attributed his initial party allegiance to the influence of David Owen, then SDP leader and MP for Plymouth Devonport, but explained that by 1988 he had come to "believe strongly in individual responsibility, in the family, the nation, enterprise. I thought to myself 'I am a natural Conservative, what am I doing in the SDP?' So I crossed over."

== Parliamentary career ==
Streeter served as a junior minister in the Lord Chancellor's Department under Prime Minister John Major from 1996 until the defeat of the Major Government in 1997. After the 1997 election, Streeter was Major's Parliamentary private secretary when he was Leader of the Opposition. He served as Shadow Secretary of State for International Development in the Shadow Cabinet of William Hague from 1998 until the new Conservative leader Iain Duncan Smith returned him to the backbenches in 2001.

He is currently a member of the Speaker's Committee on the Electoral Commission and is the member of the committee responsible for answering oral questions in Parliament on behalf of the Electoral Commission. He assumed the role after Sir Peter Viggers stepped down during the MPs' expenses scandal. His own expenses for 2008/09 were £162,719, ranking 158th out of 647 MPs.

In March 2012, Streeter was one of three MPs who signed a letter to the Advertising Standards Authority asking it to reverse its decision to stop the Christian group "Healing on the Streets of Bath" from making explicit claims that prayer can heal. The letter called for the ASA to provide "indisputable scientific evidence" that faith healing did not work. Another signer, Tim Farron of the Liberal Democrats, later wrote that the letter was not "well-worded" and that he should not have signed it "as it was written".

In 2013, Streeter referred to the "familiar glint in the swivelled eyes of the purists" within his own party in an article attacking the divisions caused by those activists who were calling for a referendum on EU membership. The remark followed allegations that senior members of the government had characterised Eurosceptic activists as "swivel-eyed loons". Streeter argued that the result of party infighting over the issue would be "a Labour-led government bend[ing] the knee to Brussels".

Streeter was opposed to Brexit prior to the 2016 referendum. In November 2018, Streeter announced his support for Theresa May's Brexit agreement.

In December 2018, it was announced that Streeter would receive a knighthood in the 2019 New Year Honours List. Streeter told the Press Association that he hoped his honour reflected, in part, his work over the past decade as chairman of the all-party group on Christians in Parliament and supporting new MPs once they had arrived at Westminster.

Streeter was a supporter of Esther McVey during the 2019 Conservative Party leadership election and one of the proposers of her nomination. McVey was eliminated in the first round of voting. In later rounds he backed Sajid Javid, who was appointed Chancellor of the Exchequer by eventual victor Boris Johnson later that year.

Streeter was reelected at the 2019 general election with an increased majority. He briefly acted as Second Deputy Chairman of Ways and Means at the start of the 2019 Parliament. On 2 February 2022, Streeter announced that he had submitted a letter to the chairman of the 1922 Committee, seeking a motion of no confidence in the prime minister, Boris Johnson, stating that "I cannot reconcile the pain and sacrifice of the vast majority of the British Public during lockdown with the attitude and activities of those working in Downing Street".

Following the resignation of Boris Johnson in July 2022, Streeter announced his support for Rishi Sunak in the subsequent July–September 2022 Conservative Party leadership election. He became the seventh MP to publicly call for the resignation of Prime Minister Liz Truss on 20 October.

On 25 November 2022, he announced that he would not seek re-election at the 2024 general election.

== Personal life ==
Streeter married Janet Stevens in 1978 in Barnstaple; the couple have a son and daughter, live near Plympton in Devon. He is a committed Christian.

In the 2015 election, his son Gareth was the Conservative candidate for Rother Valley in South Yorkshire. He polled third, behind incumbent Sir Kevin Barron and Cllr Cowles of UKIP. In 2023, Gareth Streeter was selected prospective parliamentary candidate for Plymouth Sutton and Devonport for the 2024 general election.

Parliament of the United Kingdom
| Preceded by Alan Clark | Member of Parliament for Plymouth Sutton; 1992–1997 | Succeeded by Linda Gilroy |
| New constituency | Member of Parliament for South West Devon; 1997–2024 | Succeeded by Rebecca Smith |
Political offices
| Preceded by Bruce Grocott | Parliamentary Private Secretary to the Leader of the Opposition; 1997 | Succeeded by David Lidington |
| Preceded by Alastair Goodlad | Shadow Secretary of State for International Development; 1998–2001 | Succeeded by Caroline Spelman |
