= Charles Colvile =

Charles Colvile may refer to:

- Charles Colvile (commentator) (born 1955), British cricket commentator, interviewer and journalist
- Charles Robert Colvile (1815–1886), English Peelite and Liberal politician
