= James Crowden =

English rower and Lord Lieutenant of Cambridgeshire (1927–2016)

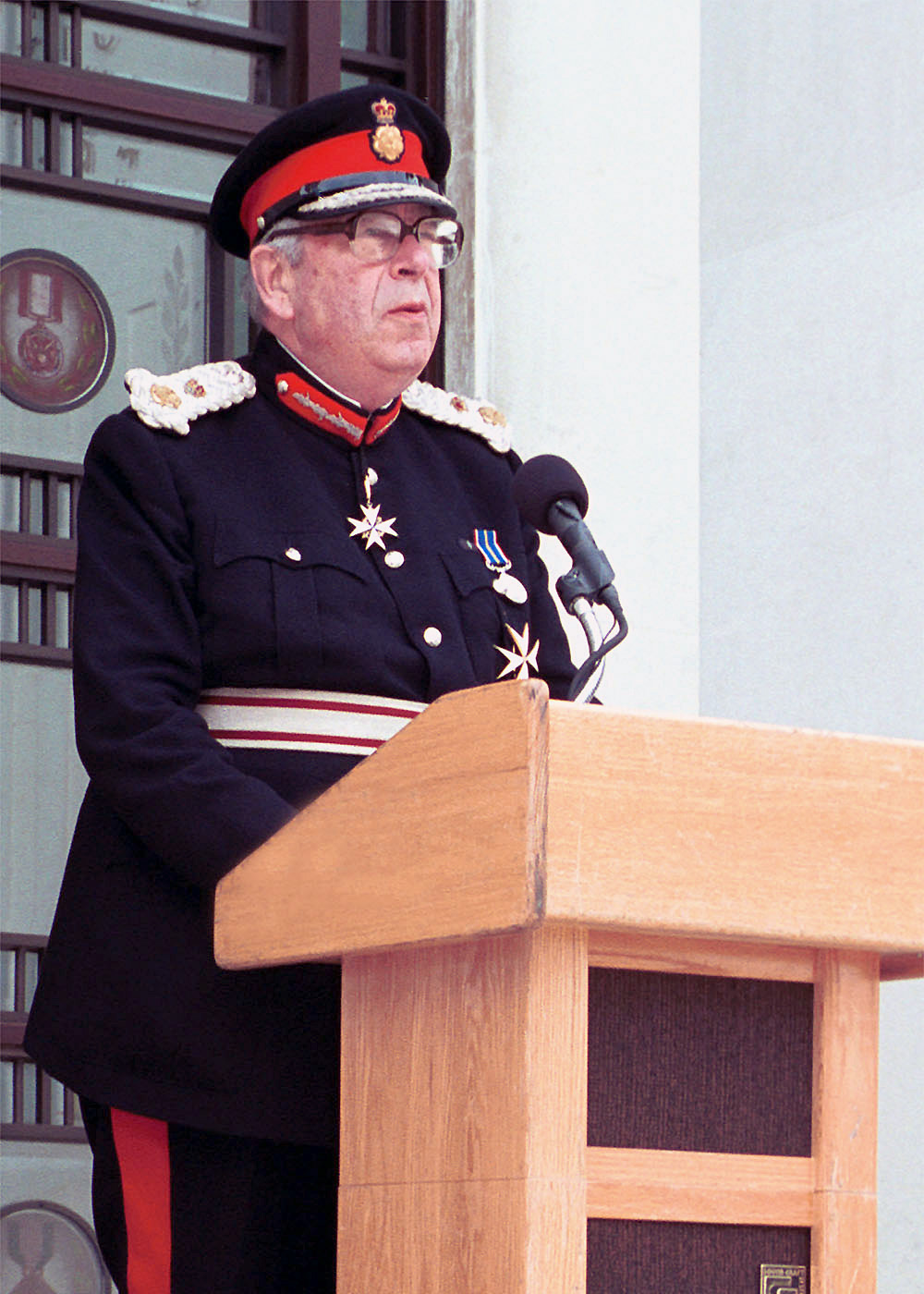

Personal information
- Born: James Gee Pascoe Crowden; 14 November 1927 Tilney All Saints
- Died: 24 September 2016 (aged 88)

Sport
- Sport: Rowing
Medal record
Men's rowing
Representing the United Kingdom
European Rowing Championships
Bronze medal – third place	1950 Milan	Eight
Gold medal – first place	1951 Mâcon	Eight

James Gee Pascoe Crowden CVO (14 November 1927 – 24 September 2016) was an English former oarsman who competed for Great Britain in the 1952 Summer Olympics. He was Lord Lieutenant of Cambridgeshire.

Crowden was born in Tilney All Saints, near Wisbech in 1927. He grew up in Peterborough and attended King's School before going on to Bedford School. He had his first victory at Henley Royal Regatta in 1946 as part of the school crew which won the Princess Elizabeth Challenge Cup, which that year was presented by the future Queen herself. He then went to Pembroke College, Cambridge. In 1951 he was part of the winning Cambridge boat in the Oxford and Cambridge Boat Race in the year when Oxford sank, and the umpire stopped the race and ordered a re-row the following Monday. He went to the United States to compete against American college crews at Yale and Harvard and won Silver Goblets at Henley partnering Brian Lloyd. Also in 1951, he won gold at the European Championships at Mâcon, in France. He was in the Boat Race again in 1952 (as President), when Cambridge lost and he competed in the coxless fours at the 1952 Summer Olympics in Helsinki. Crowden became the Cambridge crew's coach for the next 20 years.

Crowden followed in the family profession, and became a chartered surveyor with a firm of auctioneers. He was High Sheriff of Cambridgeshire and Isle of Ely in 1970 and was Lord Lieutenant of Cambridgeshire from 3 July 1992 to 2002.

Crowden was a vice-president of the British Olympic Association and a Steward of Henley Regatta. He was involved with the Cambridgeshire Olympic Committee, and with Peterborough Rowing Club.

His first wife Kathleen died in 1989 and his only son Richard was killed in a road accident in 1982. His second wife Margaret was his brother's widow, and died in November 2009. Crowden died at the age of 88 on 24 September 2016.

== See also ==
- List of Cambridge University Boat Race crews

Honorary titles
Preceded by Arthur Marshall	High Sheriff of Cambridgeshire and Isle of Ely; 1970–1971	Succeeded by Douglas Beaumont Kaye
Preceded by Michael Guy Molesworth Bevan	Lord Lieutenant of Cambridgeshire; 1992–2002	Succeeded by Hugh Duberly
