= Ian MacLaurin, Baron MacLaurin of Knebworth =

British businessman, cricket chairman, Chancellor, and politician (born 1937)

The Right Honourable The Lord MacLaurin of Knebworth DL FRSA

Member of the House of Lords
- Lord Temporal
- Life peerage 18 October 1996 – 22 December 2017

Chancellor of the University of Hertfordshire

Personal details
- Born: 30 March 1937 (age 89) Blackheath, Kent, United Kingdom

Ian Charter MacLaurin, Baron MacLaurin of Knebworth DL FRSA (born 30 March 1937) is a British businessman, who has been chairman of Vodafone and chairman and chief executive of Tesco. He is a former chairman of the England and Wales Cricket Board, a former president of the Marylebone Cricket Club and a former Chancellor of the University of Hertfordshire.

He was a Conservative member of the House of Lords from 1996 until his retirement in 2017.

== Early life ==
Ian MacLaurin was born in 1937 in Blackheath, Kent. He attended Shrewsbury House School and Malvern College.

Malvern College

== Career ==
=== Tesco ===
MacLaurin joined Tesco in 1959 as a management trainee, then held a number of more senior appointments in its retail operations before being appointed to its Board in 1970. He was appointed managing director in the 1970s and became chairman in 1985.

By the time of his retirement in 1997 Tesco had overtaken Sainsbury's to become the largest UK retailer. MacLaurin led Tesco away from the "pile it high, sell it cheap" business philosophy of founder Jack Cohen. He has claimed his most important act was appointing the right successor, Terry Leahy.

=== Vodafone ===
MacLaurin joined Vodafone as a non-executive director in 1997, becoming chairman in July 1998. He stepped down on the merger with AirTouch Communications Inc in 1999, resuming his role a year later.

Upon his retirement from the board in July 2006, he became an adviser to the company. He was succeeded as chairman by Sir John Bond. He also became chairman of the Vodafone Group Foundation, an independent charitable trust set up to administer charitable and other donations on behalf of the company.

=== Cricket ===
MacLaurin has always been enthusiastic towards sports. At Malvern College, he played in the First XI. In his 20s, he played Minor Counties cricket for Hertfordshire. From 1997 until 2002 he was the Chairman of the England and Wales Cricket Board and is now Chairman of the Sport Honours Committee. Ironically as a Conservative Peer, under his stewardship of the ECB, he oversaw the existing 100-year plus format of the County Championship split into two divisions, and made a similar amendment to Sunday League cricket, rebranded as the National League, where teams for the first time added American style monikers to their names.

MacLaurin was President of the Marylebone Cricket Club from 1 October 2017 to 30 September 2018.

His son Neil MacLaurin has played first-class and List A cricket for Middlesex, as well as Minor Counties and List A cricket for Hertfordshire.

=== Other ===
MacLaurin is a supervisory board member of Heineken International.

MacLaurin has been a Chancellor of the University of Hertfordshire. He was also the long-term chairman of the college council of Malvern College.

He is the president of The Enterprise Forum, a not-for-profit organisation that organises meetings between business and the Coalition government.

MacLaurin is chairman of Paperless Receipts Ltd, a company that works with retailers including Argos, Monsoon Accessorize and Booths.

MacLaurin is honorary life president of Hope for Tomorrow, a UK cancer charity.

== Honours ==
He was elected a Fellow of the Royal Society of Arts (FRSA) in 1986. He was knighted in 1989, and raised to the peerage for life in 1996 taking the title Baron MacLaurin of Knebworth, of Knebworth in the County of Hertfordshire. He served as a deputy lieutenant of the County of Hertfordshire from 1992 to 2001 and for Wiltshire from 2002 to 2012. This gives him the Post Nominal Letters "DL" for Life. He was awarded Honorary Life Membership of the Marylebone Cricket Club in 2005.

Coat of arms of Ian MacLaurin, Baron MacLaurin of Knebworth
Crest On a rock Proper a griffin segreant Sable supporting a cornucopia discharging its fruit Proper. Escutcheon Argent two chevronels between in chief two leopards' heads affronty Sable each crowned with an eastern crown Or and in base a lymphad also Sable. Supporters On either side a badger sejant erect Proper clawed and gorged with a plain collar attached thereto a chain reflexed over the back Or. Motto Alta Peto

Orders of precedence in the United Kingdom
Preceded by The Lord Chadlington	Gentlemen; The Lord MacLaurin of Knebworth	Followed by The Lord Whitty
