= The Enterprise Forum =

The Enterprise Forum is an independent, British, not-for-profit organisation that was founded in 1997 to facilitate discussions on policy between the Business Community and the Conservative Party. In 2010 the organisation began engagement with the Liberal Democrats in light of the formation of the Coalition Government.

The Enterprise Forum is run by an unpaid board of senior directors drawn from business and industry. The organisation does not take a position on policy, and does not donate to or receive donations from any political party.

== History ==
The Enterprise Forum was founded in 1997 by Andrew Cumpsty and Alistair Burt through a desire to ensure business involvement in the Conservative Party's policy development. Its aim is to improve the quality and flow of information between the business community and the Conservative Party. Alistair Burt was the first Chairman of the Enterprise Forum. The Chairman is Andrew Cumpsty who took over from Alistair Burt due to his re-election to Parliament in 2001.

The first formal meeting, held in Autumn 1997, by the Enterprise Forum was with Peter Lilley MP, the then Deputy Leader of the Conservative Party. Since that time the Enterprise Forum has had virtually every front bench Conservative Politician speak at one of its meetings.

== Liberal Democrats ==
A decision by the Board of Directors, after the May 2010 General Election and the formation of the Coalition Government, was that the programme of events should also include Liberal Democrat MPs. The first Liberal Democrat to speak at an Enterprise Forum event was Steve Webb MP, Minister of State for Pensions. The meeting was held on the one year anniversary of the Coalition (12 May 2011).

== Membership and meetings ==
The Enterprise Forum’s members are businesses and organisations that want to engage on policy with the Coalition Government or before 2010, the Conservative Party. Membership includes commercial organisations (including FTSE 100 companies and SME’s), trade associations and charities.

The programme of events is determined by the policy priorities of the member organisations. All meetings are held under the Chatham House Rule.

Additionally, the Forum also engages with key policy stakeholders outside of the Conservative and Liberal Democrat Parties. These have included Director Generals at the CBI, Deputy Governors at The Bank of England and the First Minister of Northern Ireland.

== European Parliament Representatives ==
Giles Chichester MEP and Malcolm Harbour MEP are the representatives for The Enterprise Forum in The European Parliament. The Enterprise Forum holds regular European Parliament update meetings in London.

== President, vice presidents and alumni ==
The President of the Enterprise Forum is The Lord MacLaurin of Knebworth DL. Vice-Presidents of the Enterprise Forum are Alistair Burt MP (Founder and former Chairman of the Enterprise Forum), David Gauke MP, Malcolm Harbour MEP, Margot James MP and Mark Prisk MP.

Former directors of the Enterprise Forum that have gone on to become MPs are David Gauke MP, Steve Barclay MP, Oliver Colvile MP, and Laura Sandys MP.
