= Ian Fraser (Plymouth Sutton MP) =

British politician (1916–1987)

Ian Montagu Fraser (14 October 1916 – 8 November 1987) was a British Conservative party politician.

Fraser stood for Tottenham in 1955 and was defeated.

In the run-up to the 1959 general election he tried to win the Conservative nomination for Finchley, but at the selection meeting was narrowly defeated by Margaret Thatcher. At the election he was elected as Member of Parliament for the Plymouth Sutton constituency. In his time in Parliament he became Parliamentary Private Secretary. He was narrowly re-elected at the 1964 general election. However he was defeated at the 1966 general election by the Labour candidate David Owen, who went on to become Foreign Secretary.

Parliament of the United Kingdom
Preceded by Jakie Astor	Member of Parliament for Plymouth Sutton; 1959–1966	Succeeded by David Owen
