= Shrewsbury House School =

Coordinates: 51.3803°N 0.3057°W

- Surbiton, Greater London, KT6 6RL; Great Britain

Information
- School type: Independent School
- Motto: "Alta Peto" (Latin: Aim High) (Note: The school motto, 'alta peto' literally translates as 'I seek the heights')
- Founded: 1865
- Founder: Rev. H. Wilson
- Oversight: Independent Schools Inspectorate
- Executive Head: Joanna Hubbard
- Gender: Boys
- Age range: 7-13
- Average class size: 16
- Campus size: 4.5 acres (1.8 ha)
- Colour
- Sports: Football, rugby and cricket, inter alia
- School fees: £6,390 or £9,186 per term
- Affiliation: St Paul's School Group
- Website: www.shrewsburyhouse.net

Shrewsbury House School, commonly referred to as SHS or Shrewsbury House, is an independent day preparatory school for boys aged 7 to 13, in Surbiton at the edge of Greater London close to the Surrey border, in England. It was established in 1865.

The school has been an educational trust since 1979, administered by a board of governors, some of whom are among its trustees.

A proportion of pupils achieve results at Common Entrance Examinations to gain entry to schools such as public schools.

== History ==
Shrewsbury House School was founded in 1865 by Rev. Henry Wilson, a local clergyman, in the centre of Surbiton and derived its name from the Wilson family’s association with the town of Shrewsbury in Shropshire.

In 1910 the School moved to Haulkerton, a large Victorian Arts and Crafts mansion dating from the mid-nineteenth century, on Ditton Hill. The main house was renamed Shrewsbury House, and the School has remained there ever since.

For the next 70 years, the School was operated by a series of private owners, most notably Henry Hamilton-Miller, who gave the School his family coat of arms and the motto Alta Peto. In 1979, the School became a charitable trust, administered by a Board of Governors, known as the Shrewsbury House School Trust.

In 2009, the school took over the pre-preparatory department of nearby Milbourne Lodge School, which was renamed Shrewsbury Lodge School and later Shrewsbury House Pre-Preparatory School, after The Rowans School, Wimbledon, joined the Shrewsbury House School Trust in 2017.

== Notable alumni ==
- Anthony Gross CBE, RA (1905–1984), printmaker, painter, war artist & film director
- Major General Philip 'Pip' Roberts, CB, DSO & Two Bars, MC (1906-1997), senior officer during the Second World War
- Sir Stirling Moss OBE (1929-2020), Formula One racing driver
- Donald Cammell (1934–1996), film director
- Ian MacLaurin, Baron MacLaurin of Knebworth (born 1937), former Chairman of Vodafone and Chairman & CEO of Tesco
- Madison Hughes (born 1992), Captain of the United States national rugby sevens team
- Alastair Gray (born 1998), tennis player
