= Luke Pollard =

British politician (born 1980)

Luke Pollard MP
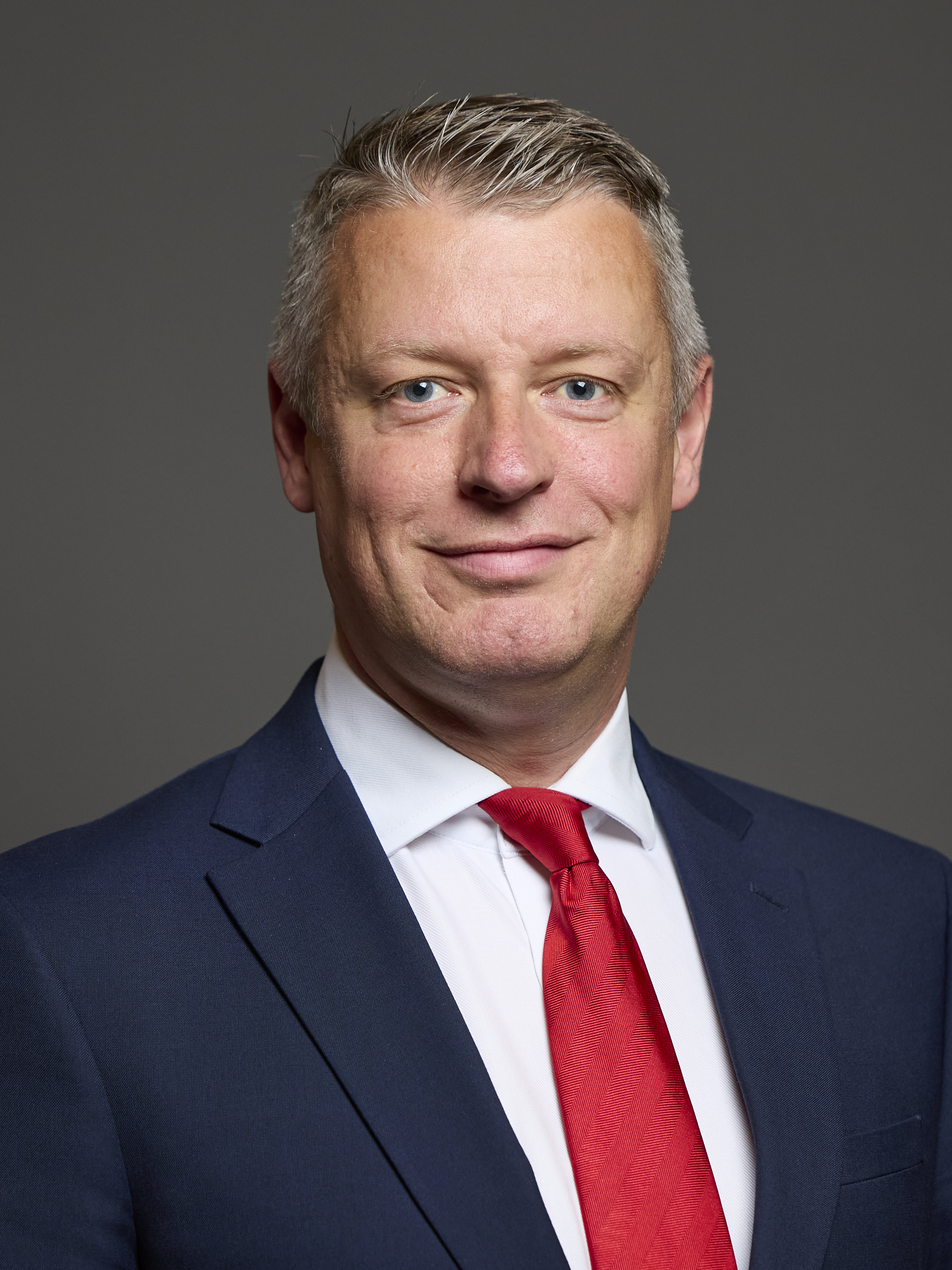
- Official portrait, 2024

Minister of State for Defence Readiness and Industry
- Incumbent
- Assumed office 6 September 2025
- Prime Minister: Keir Starmer; Andy Burnham
- Preceded by: Maria Eagle

Parliamentary Under-Secretary of State for the Armed Forces
- In office 9 July 2024 – 6 September 2025
- Prime Minister: Keir Starmer
- Preceded by: Leo Docherty
- Succeeded by: Al Carns

Member of Parliament for Plymouth Sutton and Devonport
- Incumbent
- Assumed office 8 June 2017
- Preceded by: Oliver Colvile
- Majority: 13,328 (31.7%)
Shadow portfolios
Shadow Secretary of State
2020–2021	Environment, Food and Rural Affairs
Shadow Minister
2022–2024	Armed Forces
2018–2020	Flooding and Coastal Communities

Personal details
- Born: 10 April 1980 (age 46) Plymouth, Devon, England
- Party: Labour Co-op
- Spouse: Sydney Robertson (m. 2024)
- Education: University of Exeter
- Website: www.lukepollard.org

Luke Pollard (born 10 April 1980) is a British politician who has served as Member of Parliament (MP) for Plymouth Sutton and Devonport since 2017. A member of the Labour and Co-operative parties, he has served as Minister of State for Defence Readiness and Industry since 2025. He previously served as Parliamentary Under-Secretary of State for the Armed Forces from 2024 to 2025.

== Early life and career ==
Pollard was born in Plymouth at Freedom Fields Hospital on 10 April 1980. He grew up in Devon. His father was a submariner in the Royal Navy based at HMNB Devonport and his mother worked at the College of St Mark and St John.

Pollard was educated at Tavistock College and Christleton High School before studying politics at the University of Exeter, graduating with first-class honours in 2001. He specialised in the politics of the European Union and international terrorism. He was elected as the campaigns officer for the students' union in 2000 and then as president of the students' union (called the Guild of Students at Exeter) in 2001.

He worked as an adviser to the Labour politicians David Jamieson and George Foulkes before becoming account director at public relations and marketing firm Edelman. After that he was the head of public affairs for the Association of British Travel Agents (ABTA) from 2009 to 2013, a role which included lobbying on aspects of the Consumer Rights Directive 2011 related to the travel industry, then head of European development for ABTA until 2014. He was a director at Field Consulting from 2015 until his election in 2017. Before his election, Pollard was an organiser for the campaign to erect a memorial for Plymouth politician and former Labour leader Michael Foot in one of the city's parks.

== Political career ==
Pollard unsuccessfully contested the South West Devon constituency in 2010 and the Plymouth Sutton and Devonport constituency in 2015, before winning the latter seat in 2017 from the Conservative incumbent Oliver Colvile on a swing of 7.2%. Pollard is the first Plymouth MP to have been born in the city since the Plymouth-born Michael Foot represented Plymouth Devonport from 1945 to 1955. In his maiden parliamentary speech, Pollard called for more frigates to be built for the Royal Navy. He campaigned to stop the sale of HMS Ocean to Brazil and for the retention of HMS Albion and HMS Bulwark both based in his Plymouth constituency. He also called for a new base for the Royal Marines after any move from their historic home at Stonehouse Barracks in Plymouth.

Pollard sat on the Transport Select Committee until his appointment as a shadow minister. He made a proposal to extend the M5 motorway to Plymouth. He presented his first private member's bill in June 2019, seeking funds to recycle the thirteen retired nuclear submarines which are stored in his Plymouth constituency. The Nuclear Submarine Recycling (Reporting) Bill passed its first reading but did not proceed further.

In July 2017, he was appointed as Parliamentary Private Secretary to Labour's shadow environment secretary, Sue Hayman. Hayman cited reasons for appointing him including his advocacy for Plymouth's fishing interests and his advocacy for Plymouth University academic Martin Attrill's proposal for Plymouth Sound to become the UK's first national marine park. Pollard convinced his party to adopt the establishment of national marine parks as policy. He was appointed as the Shadow Minister for Flooding and Coastal Communities on 30 July 2018, a part of the shadow environment team led by Hayman.

Pollard led a campaign to prevent the early release of serial abuser Vanessa George who abused babies and toddlers at the Little Ted's nursery in Plymouth. He supported proposed changes to the law to "require the Parole Board to take into account any failure by a prisoner serving a sentence for unlawful killing or for taking or making an indecent image of a child to disclose information about the victim", as had been the case for George.

In November 2017, Pollard supported a campaign to erect a statue to mark the centenary of the election of his predecessor Nancy Astor, as the first woman to take her seat in the House of Commons.

Pollard was re-elected in 2019, with the Conservative candidate coming second and the former Conservative MP and Brexit Party MEP Ann Widdecombe a distant third. He was promoted to shadow environment secretary after Hayman lost her seat in 2019. As shadow environment secretary, he argued for amendments to the 2020 Fisheries Bill to require fish from the UK's quota to land in UK ports and to give more quota access to smaller-scale fishers. In the 2020 Labour Party leadership election and deputy leadership election, he nominated Keir Starmer and Rosena Allin-Khan and endorsed Starmer and Angela Rayner. He was described by the i newspaper as a "rising star" who could be re-appointed as shadow environment secretary or made shadow transport secretary if Starmer became leader of the Labour Party. Pollard remained in his post as shadow environment secretary's in Keir Starmer's Shadow Cabinet.

On 30 August 2021, Keir Starmer announced that Daniel Zeichner would become acting Shadow Secretary of State for Environment, Food and Rural Affairs in place of Pollard until the 2021 Labour Party Conference to allow Pollard to spend more time with his community after the Plymouth shooting. He resumed his role on 5 October 2021.

Pollard departed the shadow cabinet in the 29 November 2021 reshuffle, after being asked to step down by Starmer. Politics Home reported that he opted to return to the back benches rather than take on a junior shadow ministerial brief of his choice. However, he returned to the front bench as Shadow Armed Forces Minister on 3 February 2022.

At the general election on 4 July 2024 he was re-elected for the constituency of Plymouth Sutton & Devonport.

On 23 June 2025, Pollard refused to say whether the United Kingdom supports US strikes on Iranian nuclear sites.

In July 2026, he was reappointed to the new government as Minister of State at the Ministry of Defence by Andy Burnham.

== Personal life ==
Pollard lives in Stoke, Plymouth with his husband. Pollard is Plymouth's first openly gay Member of Parliament. He supports Plymouth Argyle Football Club and Plymouth Raiders Basketball Team. He is a keen wild swimmer. He is a member of the Unite and GMB trade unions.

During the 2019 general election, Pollard's constituency office was vandalised twice with homophobic slurs. Pollard invited the perpetrators to speak with him about why they did it. He later received online homophobic abuse on Valentine's Day 2021, after posting a picture of himself and his boyfriend.

== Publications ==
- Pollard, Luke (September 2018). "Sweating the Assets: A New Home with a New Ethos". In Frith, James (ed.). New Brooms: Ideas for reforming Westminster from Labour's 2017 intake (PDF). London: Fabian Society. pp. 41–46. ISBN 978-0-7163-0647-4.

== Notes ==
Parliament of the United Kingdom
Preceded by Oliver Colvile	Member of Parliament for Plymouth Sutton and Devonport; 2017–present	Incumbent
