= Jakie Astor =

English politician and sportsman (1918–2000)

Major The Honourable Sir Jakie Astor MBE ERD
- Astor in 1952, by Elliot & Fry

Member of Parliament for Plymouth Sutton
- In office 25 October 1951 – 18 September 1959
- Preceded by: Lucy Middleton
- Succeeded by: Ian Montagu Fraser

High Sheriff of Cambridgeshire and Isle of Ely
- In office 1967–1968
- Preceded by: John Beckett
- Succeeded by: Alfred Gray

Personal details
- Born: 29 August 1918 Cliveden, Buckinghamshire, England
- Died: 10 September 2000 (aged 82) Wandsworth, London, England
- Spouses: Ana Inez Carcano (m. 1944; div. 1972) Susan Eveleigh Sheppard (m. 1976; div. 1985) Marcia de Savary (m. 1988)
- Relations: Astor family
- Children: 3
- Parent(s): Waldorf Astor; Nancy Witcher Langhorne
- Education: Eton College; New College, Oxford
- Awards: Knight Bachelor (1978); OBE (1945); ERD (1989); Légion d'Honneur; Croix de Guerre

Major Sir John Jacob "Jakie" Astor VII, MBE, ERD (29 August 1918 – 10 September 2000) was an English politician and sportsman. He was a member of the prominent Astor family.

== Early life ==
John Jacob "Jakie" Astor VII was born 29 August 1918 at Cliveden, the family estate in Buckinghamshire. He was the youngest of the four sons of Waldorf Astor, 2nd Viscount Astor and Nancy Astor, Viscountess Astor (1878–1964). His mother was the first woman elected to Parliament to take her seat in Parliament. His siblings were Robert Gould Shaw III (1898–1970), his half-brother from his mother's first marriage, William Waldorf Astor II (1907–1966), Nancy Phyllis Louise Astor (1909–1975), Francis David Langhorne Astor (1912–2001), and Michael Langhorne Astor (1916–1980). He was named after his relative John Jacob Astor IV, who perished on the Titanic in 1912. Educated at Eton and New College, Oxford, Astor then served in the Special Air Service and the Life Guards during World War II.

== Career ==
In 1945, Astor contested the Plymouth Sutton seat in the British House of Commons that had been held by both his parents. Unsuccessful at first, he won the seat in 1951 as a member of the Conservative Party, losing it in 1959. From 1960 to 1974, he held the office of Justice of the Peace for Cambridgeshire. In 1967, he was appointed High Sheriff of Cambridgeshire and Isle of Ely, serving until 1968.

=== Later career ===
Astor was a Thoroughbred horse racing enthusiast who won a number of prestigious races including the St. Leger Stakes. He owned the West Ilsley Stables, where Dick Hern trained. In 1978 he was granted a knighthood for services to agriculture, due to his chairmanship of the Agricultural Research Council. and the success of his 1,900-acre farms at Hatley Park, his home in Cambridgeshire.

== Personal life ==
Astor was married three times. He married firstly on 23 October 1944 to Ana Inez "Chiquita" Carcano y Morra (1918–1992), daughter of Miguel Ángel Cárcano, Argentine ambassador to the United Kingdom (from 1942 to 1946) and a prominent Catholic laywoman, which hurt his relationship with his mother. His mother had become a Christian Scientist. Ana's sister, Stella Carcano y Morra, married William Ward, 4th Earl of Dudley in 1946. Before their divorce in 1972, Jakie and Ana had three children:

- Michael Ramon Langhorne Astor (b. 1946), who married Daphne Warburg (1949-2024), daughter of Mary and Edward M. M. Warburg, in 1979.
- Stella Inez Astor (b. 1949)
- John William Astor (1962–1963), who died as an infant.

In 1976, he married secondly Susan Eveleigh Sheppard, that marriage too ended in divorce in 1985. In 1988, he married thirdly Marcia de Savary, former wife of Peter de Savary, to whom he remained married until his death in 2000. There were no children from the second or third marriages.

== Honours and awards ==
- Knight Bachelor 3 June 1978
- Member of the Order of the British Empire 1 February 1945
- Emergency Reserve Decoration 30 May 1989
- Légion d'Honneur (France)
- Croix de Guerre (France)

Parliament of the United Kingdom
Preceded by Lucy Middleton	Member of Parliament for Plymouth Sutton; 1951–1959	Succeeded by Ian Fraser
Honorary titles
Preceded by John Beckett	High Sheriff of Cambridgeshire and Isle of Ely; 1967–1968	Succeeded by Alfred Gray
