= Rebecca Smith (politician) =

British Conservative Party politician

Rebecca Smith MP
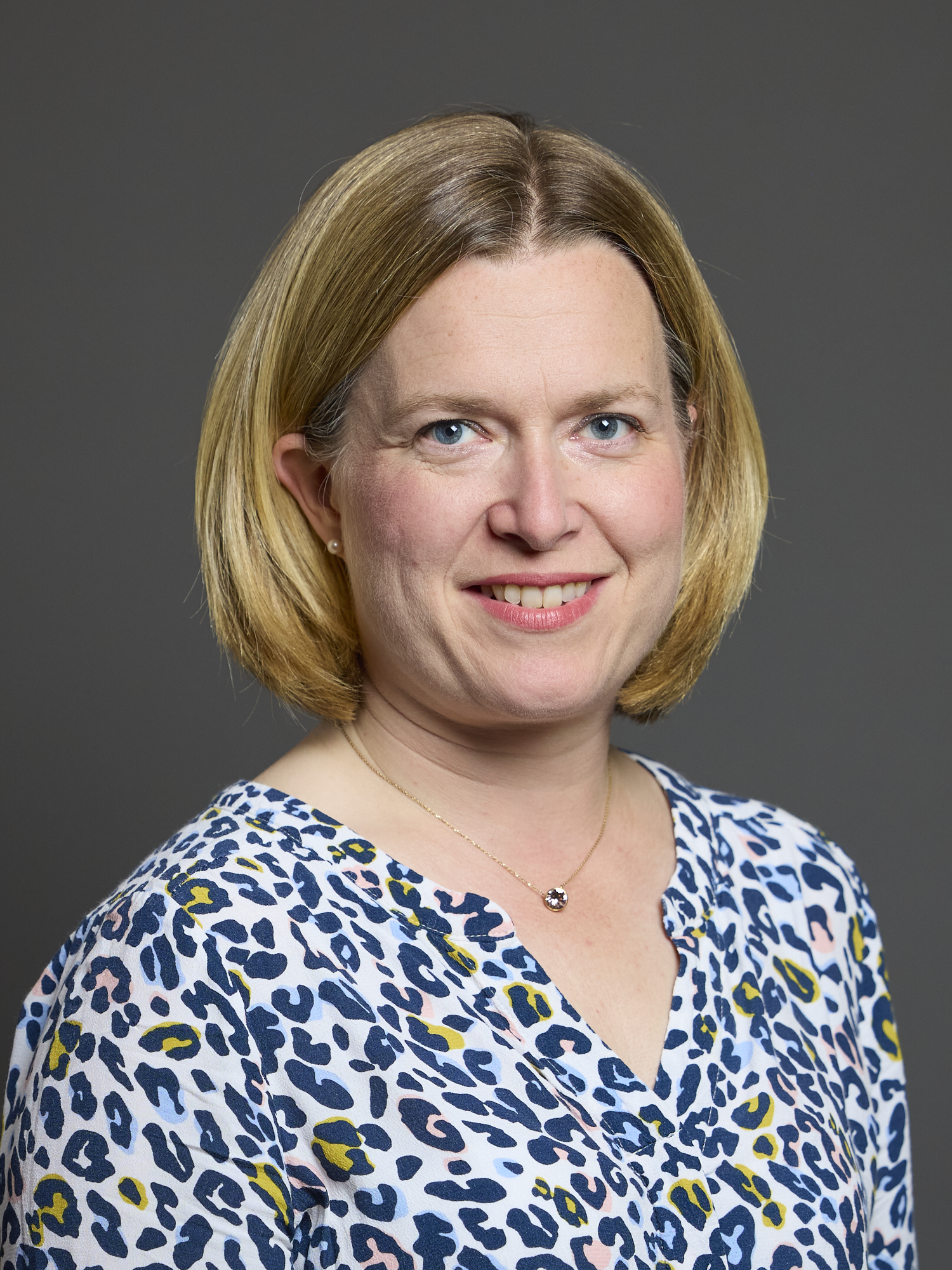
- Official portrait, 2024

Shadow Minister for Education
- Incumbent
- Assumed office 31 August 2026
- Leader: Kemi Badenoch

Senior Opposition Whip
- Incumbent
- Assumed office 31 August 2026

Member of Parliament for South West Devon
- Incumbent
- Assumed office 4 July 2024
- Preceded by: Gary Streeter
- Majority: 2,112 (4.0%)

Personal details
- Born: Rebecca Jane Smith; 1981 (age 44–45) Plymouth
- Party: Conservative
- Website: www.rebecca-smith.org.uk

Rebecca Jane Smith (Born 1980) is a British Conservative Party politician who has served as Member of Parliament for South West Devon since 2024. She previously served as a councillor on Plymouth City Council from 2018 until 2026, representing the Plymstock Radford ward. She currently sits as an Senior Opposition Whip and a Shadow Education Minister.

== Education and career ==
Smith attended Plymouth High School for Girls and then graduated from the University of Southampton in 2002. She worked for the Ulster Unionist MEP Jim Nicholson in Brussels before taking a role at Plymouth County Council's homeless and social housing unit. She also worked for a number of Conservative MPs including David Burrowes and Johnny Mercer.

== MP and Councillor ==
Rebecca was elected as a Plymouth City Council councillor in 2018, before standing down in 2026.

Smith was elected MP for South West Devon in the 2024 general election, succeeding retiring Conservative MP Sir Gary Streeter. She won with 17,916 votes and a majority of 2,112 over Labour's Sarah Allen.

Smith previously sat on the Renters' Rights Bill and Public Authorities (Fraud, Error and Recovery) Public Bill Committees. She has sat on the Transport Select Committee since October 2024, where she has raised concerns about rail services in her constituency, including pushing for CrossCountry trains to stop at Ivybridge. In parliamentary debates, Smith has spoken on local government reorganisation, highlighting fiscal risks for councils like South Hams and Plymouth.

Smith was appointed a Junior Opposition Whip in November 2024, before being promoted to a Senior Opposition Whip in August 2026 by leader Kemi Badenoch.

== Electoral history ==
General election 2024: South West Devon
Party	Candidate	Votes	%	±%
Conservative	Rebecca Smith	17,916	34.3	−28.3
Labour	Sarah Allen	15,804	30.3	+8.9
Reform	Stephen Horner	9,361	17.9	N/A
Liberal Democrats	Julian Brazil	5,551	10.6	−1.5
Green	Lauren McLay	2,925	5.6	+1.7
Independent	Alan Spencer	438	0.8	N/A
TUSC	Ben Davy	141	0.3	N/A
Heritage	Darryl Ingram	106	0.2	N/A
Majority		2,112	4.0	−36.2
Turnout		52,242	66.5	−7.9
Registered electors		77,600		
Conservative hold		Swing	−18.6	

General election 2019: Plymouth Sutton and Devonport
Party	Candidate	Votes	%	±%
Labour Co-op	Luke Pollard	25,461	47.9	–5.4
Conservative	Rebecca Smith	20,704	38.9	–1.1
Brexit Party	Ann Widdecombe	2,909	5.5	N/A
Liberal Democrats	Graham Reed	2,545	4.8	+2.4
Green	James Ellwood	1,557	2.9	+1.7
Majority		4,757	9.0	–4.3
Turnout		53,176	68.3	+1.3
Registered electors		77,852		
Labour Co-op hold		Swing	–2.2	

Plymouth City Council Election 2016: Southway
Party	Candidate	Votes	%	±%
Labour	Lorraine Parker*	1,223	36.1	▼15.2
Conservative	Rebecca Smith	1,135	33.5	+6.6
UKIP	Bill Wakeham	645	19.0	▼2.8
Plymouth Independents	Natasha Squires	224	6.6	N/A
Green	Daniel Sheaff	76	2.2	N/A
Liberal Democrats	Storm Norman	56	1.7	N/A
TUSC	Nik Brookson	30	0.8	N/A
Majority		88	2.6	▼21.8
Labour hold		Swing	▼10.9	

Plymouth City Council Election 2018: Plymstock Radford
Party	Candidate	Votes	%	±%
Conservative	Rebecca Smith	1,964	48.7	▲9.6
Labour Co-op	Vince Barry	842	20.9	▼0.1
Independent	John Wheeler	453	11.2	N/A
Independent	Gordon Miller	314	7.8	N/A
Liberal Democrats	Roy Plumley	247	6.1	N/A
Green	Matthew Faith	212	5.3	N/A
Majority		1,122	27.8	▲26.6
Turnout		4,032	37.5	▼3.0
Conservative hold		Swing	▲4.9	

Plymouth City Council Election 2022: Plymstock Radford
Party	Candidate	Votes	%	±%
Conservative	Rebecca Smith*	2,055	52.3	▲3.6
Labour	Jon Davies	1,022	26.0	▲5.1
Independent	Neal Stoneman	339	8.6	N/A
Green	Byran Driver	294	7.5	▲0.3
Liberal Democrats	Roy Plumley	219	5.6	▼0.5
Turnout		3,929	35.1	▼2.4
Conservative hold		Swing	▲1.5	

Parliament of the United Kingdom
Preceded by Gary Streeter	Member of Parliament for South West Devon; 2024–present	Incumbent
