= Sheriff of Cambridgeshire and Isle of Ely =

Ceremonial officer of Cambridgeshire and Ely, England

Below is a list of High Sheriffs of Cambridgeshire and Isle of Ely since the creation of that county in 1965 until its abolition in 1974:

- Before 1965 see Sheriff of Cambridgeshire and Huntingdonshire
- 1965–1966: Francis Wingate William Pemberton, of Trumpington Hall, Cambridge.
- 1966–1967: Colonel John Goodwyn Allden Beckett, of "Mallabar's", Brays Lane, Ely.
- 1967–1968: John Jacob Astor, of Hatley Park, Hatley St. George, Sandy, Bedfordshire.
- 1968–1969: Commander Alfred Francis Colenso Gray, of 54 Wimblington Road, March.
- 1969–1970: Arthur Gregory George Marshall, of Horseheath Lodge, Linton, Cambridge.
- 1970–1971: James Gee Pascoe Crowden, of Little Needham, 75 Harecroft Road, Wisbech.
- 1971–1972: Colonel Douglas Robert Beaumont Kaye, of Brinkley Hall, Newmarket
- 1972–1973: Edwin Harrison Morris, of Ancaster Farm, Stonea, near March.
- 1973–1974: Sir (Alfred) Stanley Fordham, of Melbourn Bury, near Royston, Herts.
- After 1974 see High Sheriff of Cambridgeshire
