= Lucy Middleton =

British politician (1894–1983)

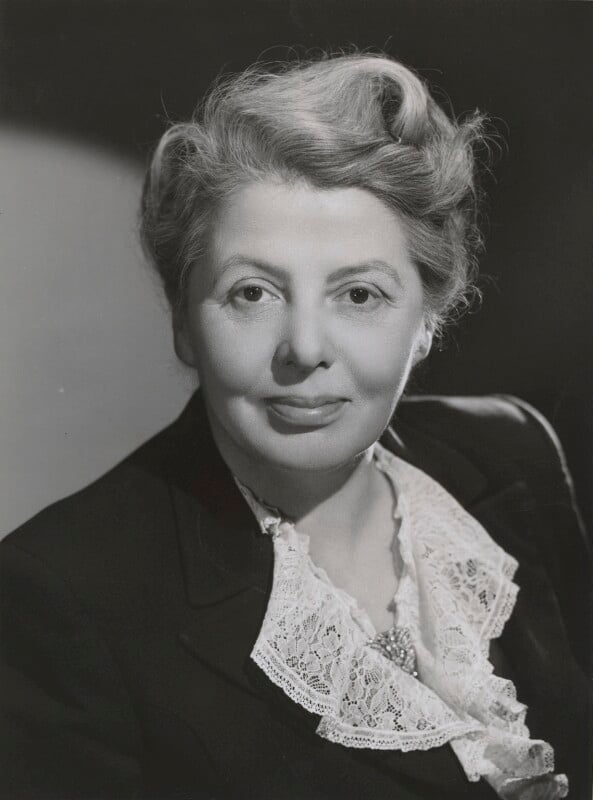
- Middleton, c. 1950

Member of Parliament for Plymouth Sutton
- In office 5 July 1945 – 4 October 1951
- Preceded by: The Viscountess Astor
- Succeeded by: Jakie Astor

Personal details
- Born: Lucy Annie Cox; 9 May 1894 Keynsham, Somerset, England
- Died: 20 November 1983 (aged 89) London, England
- Party: Labour
- Spouse: James Middleton (m. 1936; died 1962)
- Education: University of Bristol

Lucy Annie Middleton (née Cox; 9 May 1894 – 20 November 1983) was a Labour politician in the United Kingdom.

== Background ==
Lucy Annie Cox was born in Keynsham, Somerset, on 9 May 1894, to working-class parents Sidney and Ada (née Britton) Cox. She was educated at the University of Bristol and was a teacher. She joined the Independent Labour Party in 1919, and was involved with the socialist movement in Bristol. She was the Labour Party candidate for Paddington South in the 1931 election and for Pudsey and Otley in the 1935 election.

In 1936, she married James Middleton, General Secretary of the Labour Party.

== Member of Parliament ==
In the 1945 landslide general election, Middleton was elected Member of Parliament for Plymouth Sutton, gaining the seat from the Conservatives, after the retirement of her predecessor Nancy Astor, Viscountess Astor.

Middleton held Plymouth Sutton until 1951, when it was gained by another member of the Astor family, Jakie Astor.

== Later life ==
Middleton was a member of the Wimbledon Labour Party when the idea of publishing a book on the contribution of women to the labour movement was put forward as a way to celebrate International Women's Year. The Labour Party agreed to publish the book, and Middleton edited the essays of the nine younger women she had invited to contribute. When finished the Labour Party General Secretary decided there was no money to publish the book, Still, Croom Helm agreed to publish it as Women in the Labour Movement, the British experience in 1977.

Middleton died from complications of a stroke and Parkinson's disease at a hospital in Carshalton, London, on 20 November 1983.

Parliament of the United Kingdom
Preceded by The Viscountess Astor	Member of Parliament for Plymouth Sutton; 1945–1951	Succeeded by Jakie Astor
