= Hugh Martyn Williams =

British chartered accountant, author and politician

Hugh Martyn Williams, commonly known as Hugh Williams, (born 7 December 1946, died 23 October 2025) was a British chartered accountant, author and politician. He was the son of the former North Cornwall Conservative MP, Alfred Martyn Williams (1898–1986). He was a senior partner of HM Williams Chartered Accountants until 2014.

== Business life ==
Williams was educated at Eton College and qualified as a Chartered Accountant in 1970. He set up his own accountancy practice in 1973, first at a small farm on Dartmoor, moving to Plympton in 2001.

== Politics ==
A former Conservative supporter, in 2003, Williams became a member of UKIP. In 2004, he met Marta Andreasen and subsequently (through St. Edward's Press) published Brussels Laid Bare.

He stood as a UKIP candidate in the 2005 and 2010 general elections in the Devon South West constituency.

In 2010, he was elected to UKIP's National Executive Committee, where he was subsequently appointed as UKIP's Deputy National Treasurer. After the 2014 European elections he briefly succeeded as National Treasurer.

Williams was a former member of the Dartmoor National Park Authority.

== Personal life ==
Williams died on 23 October 2025. He is survived by his wife, five children and nine grandchildren. He was a lifelong supporter of Plymouth Argyle F.C.
