= Oliver Colvile =

British Conservative politician (1959–2025)

Member of Parliament for Plymouth Sutton and Devonport
- In office 6 May 2010 – 3 May 2017
- Preceded by: Linda Gilroy
- Succeeded by: Luke Pollard

Personal details
- Born: 26 August 1959
- Died: 20 October 2025 (aged 66)
- Party: Conservative
- Relations: Charles Colvile (brother)
- Profession: Politician

Oliver Newton Colvile (26 August 1959 – 20 October 2025) was a British politician. He was a Conservative Member of Parliament (MP) for Plymouth Sutton and Devonport.

== Background ==
Colvile was born on 26 August 1959. His father served as an officer in the Royal Navy for over 30 years, his grandfather was the First Lieutenant of Plymouth's Naval barracks, whilst his uncle was a Royal Marines officer who served at Stonehouse. Colvile said his interest in politics took hold whilst at Stowe School when he became fascinated by how an idea could become law or a policy to protect civil liberties, to enhance people's freedom and for the enjoyment of life. He joined the Conservative Party's staff at the age of 21, working for Ministers and backbench MPs. He later devised community campaigns which saw the Conservatives return to Parliament a number of its candidates in marginal seats. Colvile formerly lived at The Millfields (formerly the Royal Naval Hospital), Plymouth.

== Political career ==
Colvile unsuccessfully contested the Plymouth Sutton constituency in the 2001 and 2005 general elections, both times losing to the sitting Labour MP Linda Gilroy. Colvile won its successor seat, Plymouth Sutton and Devonport, at the 2010 general election with a majority of 1149 and 34.3% of the votes cast, ousting Gilroy with a swing of 6.9% calculated after allowing for significant boundary changes. He held the seat at the 2015 general election with a reduced majority of 523. Colvile was named by Conservative Home as one of a minority of loyal Conservative backbench MPs not to have voted against the government in any significant rebellions.

Colvile lost his seat at the 2017 general election to Luke Pollard of the Labour Party.

Parliamentary and government roles

- House of Commons Northern Ireland Affairs Select Committee. (26 July 2010 until July 2016)
- Public Bill Committee for the Defence Reform Act 2014.
- Parliamentary Private Secretary (PPS) to the ministers at the Ministry of Defence.
- PPS to the Secretary of State for Northern Ireland (July 2016 until June 2017).

== Electoral Commission and police investigation ==
In March 2017, the Electoral Commission fined the Conservative Party £70,000. During the 2015 general election coaches of activists were transported to marginal constituencies including Plymouth Sutton & Devonport to campaign alongside or in close proximity to local campaigners. The tour party stopped off at the Jury's Inn in Exeter Street, Plymouth, where it used 29 rooms. The inclusion in the Party national return of what in the commission's view should have been reported as candidate spending meant that there was a realistic prospect that this enabled its candidates to gain a financial advantage over opponents. Oliver Colvile was investigated by Devon and Cornwall Police over whether he breached election spending rules. Devon and Cornwall Police subsequently confirmed that a file has been passed to the Crown Prosecution Service for a decision on whether Mr Colvile should be prosecuted for electoral fraud in relation to the 2015 general election.

== Japan Tobacco ==
Colvile was criticised when it was revealed in October 2011 that he received hospitality equivalent to £694.80 from Japan Tobacco, owners of the Benson & Hedges and Silk Cut brands, paying for a visit to see Test match cricket at The Oval that summer, coming shortly after he voted in favour of relaxing the smoking ban. Colvile was again criticised in July 2013 when it was revealed he received two free tickets (worth £1,260) to the RHS Chelsea Flower Show, again from Japan Tobacco.

== European Union ==
Colvile was in favour of Britain remaining in the European Union during the 2016 referendum campaign.

== Overseas trip ==
In March 2013, Colvile, who was then vice-chair of the all-party parliamentary group on the Armed Forces made an all-expenses-paid trip to Saudi Arabia as a delegate of the UK Defence Forum that he received from the Saudi Arabian government.

== Other interests ==
Following a spell at an agency advising on business development, beginning in 1996 Oliver Colvile ran a communications business specialising in handling community consultation for major regeneration projects. He was a member of the Federation of Small Businesses and the Institute of Directors, and was also a former director of the Enterprise Forum. Colvile was a keen cricketer and a member of the Addis Army, which supports the England national side.

== Death ==
Colvile died on 20 October 2025, at the age of 66. His death was announced by Stuart Andrew in the House of Commons. Tributes were led by Speaker of the House of Commons Sir Lindsay Hoyle, Wes Streeting on behalf of the Government, and Conservative MP Graham Stuart.

Parliament of the United Kingdom
| Preceded by Linda Gilroy | Member of Parliament for Plymouth Sutton and Devonport; 2010–2017 | Succeeded by Luke Pollard |
