= Arthur Marshall (engineer) =

British aviation pioneer (1903–2007)

Sir Arthur Marshall
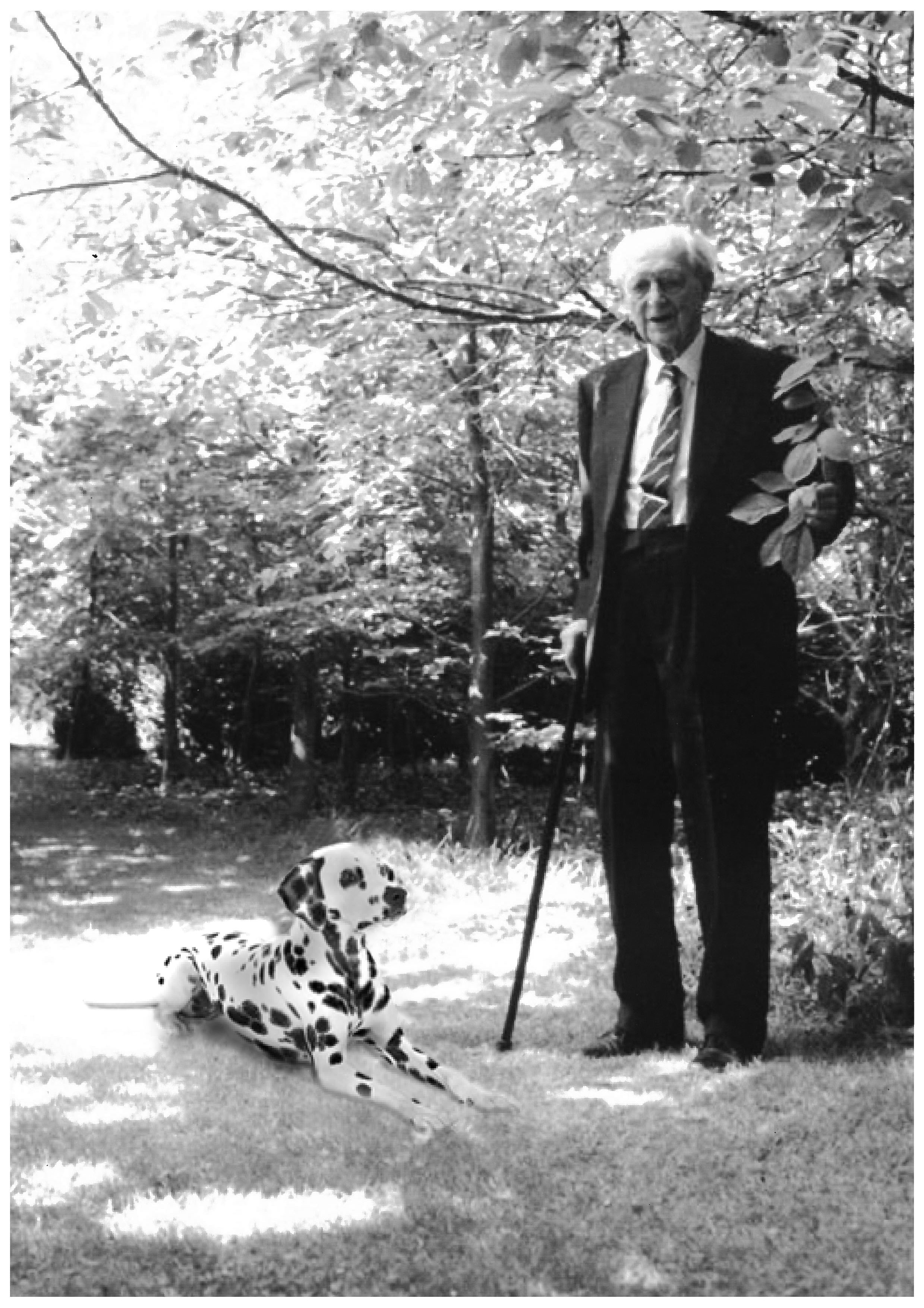
- Sir Arthur Marshall and dog in his back garden
- Born: 4 December 1903; Chesterton, Cambridge, England
- Died: 16 March 2007 (aged 103); Horseheath, Cambridgeshire, England
- Occupation(s): aviation pioneer and entrepreneur
- Children: Michael Marshall (1932–2019); David Marshall (born 1934)
- Parent(s): David Gregory Marshall (1873–1942); Maude Edmunds Wing (1879–1930)

Sir Arthur Gregory George Marshall, OBE, (4 December 1903 – 16 March 2007) was a British aviation pioneer and businessman, who served as the chairman of Marshall Aerospace between 1942 and 1989.

== Early life and education ==
Arthur Marshall was born in Cambridge, England and was educated at The Perse School in Cambridge and at Tonbridge School in Kent, completing his education at Jesus College, Cambridge, where he earned a first-class degree in engineering.

He learned to fly in 1928, and shortly thereafter created an airstrip near his family's Cambridge home, which by 1929 had turned into a full-fledged airfield. Six years later, Marshall and his father, David, bought the land where the present Cambridge Airport now stands and started Marshall Aerospace.

During World War II, Marshall's played a key role in training over 20,000 pilots and flying instructors.

Under Sir Arthur's guidance, the firm became the UK's largest aircraft repairer, fixing or converting 5,000 planes during the war. Over the years, such major airplane manufacturers as De Havilland, Bristol, Vickers and English Electric have entrusted Marshall's with the servicing of their aircraft.

Marshall's company built under subcontract the famous droop nose for Concorde.

== Sport ==
In addition to his interest in aeronautics, Marshall also became a gifted sportsman early in his life and tried out for a place on the British team at the 1924 Olympics in Paris, a team which was depicted in the 1981 Oscar-winning film Chariots of Fire. He helped to stage the "Chariots of Fire" charity run through Cambridge for a trophy named in his honour.

== Honours ==
Marshall was appointed an OBE in 1948, and was knighted in 1974. In 1931, he married Rosemary Dimsdale, the grand-daughter of the 6th Lord Dimsdale. The couple had three children, including Michael Marshall, who took over the running of the company upon Sir Arthur's retirement. Lady Marshall died on 24 June 1988.

On the death of James Stillman Rockefeller in August 2004 he became the oldest living Olympic athlete.

== Death and legacy ==
He died in the early hours of 16 March 2007 at his home, Horseheath Lodge, near Linton in Cambridgeshire, aged 103. He is buried in the cemetery at All Saints church Horseheath.

To commemorate Sir Arthur's lifelong interest in aviation, the Marshall family donated a trophy to the Air Training Corps to be presented to "The Most Improved Squadron in the ATC over a Protracted Period of Time".

The Sir Arthur Marshall Institute for Aeronautics was established in the Department of Engineering at the University of Cambridge in 2001. The Sir Arthur Marshall Visiting Professorship of Sustainable Urban Design was established in the Department of Architecture at the University of Cambridge in 2009.

Honorary titles
Preceded by Alfred Gray	High Sheriff of Cambridgeshire and Isle of Ely; 1969–1970	Succeeded by James Crowden
