= Plymouth Sutton and Devonport =

UK Parliament constituency (since 2010)

Coordinates: 50.37°N 4.141°W

- Borough constituency for the House of Commons
- Interactive map of boundaries since 2024
- Boundary of Plymouth Sutton and Devonport in South West England
- County: Devon
- Electorate: 73,495 (2023)
- Major settlements: Plymouth

Current constituency
- Created: 2010
- Member of Parliament: Luke Pollard (Labour Co-op)
- Seats: One
- Created from: Plymouth Devonport, Plymouth Sutton

Plymouth Sutton and Devonport (Plymouth, Sutton and Devonport until 2024) is a constituency created in 2010, and represented in the House of Commons of the UK Parliament since 2017 by Luke Pollard of the Labour and Co-operative Party. The seat is a borough constituency (for the purposes of type of returning officer and election expenses). As with all current constituencies it elects one Member of Parliament (MP) by the first past the post system.

Pollard's 2017 win was one of 30 net gains for the Labour Party. The seat was in 2010 and 2015 a very marginal win for Oliver Colvile of the Conservative Party, his greatest majority being 2.6%.

== Constituency profile ==
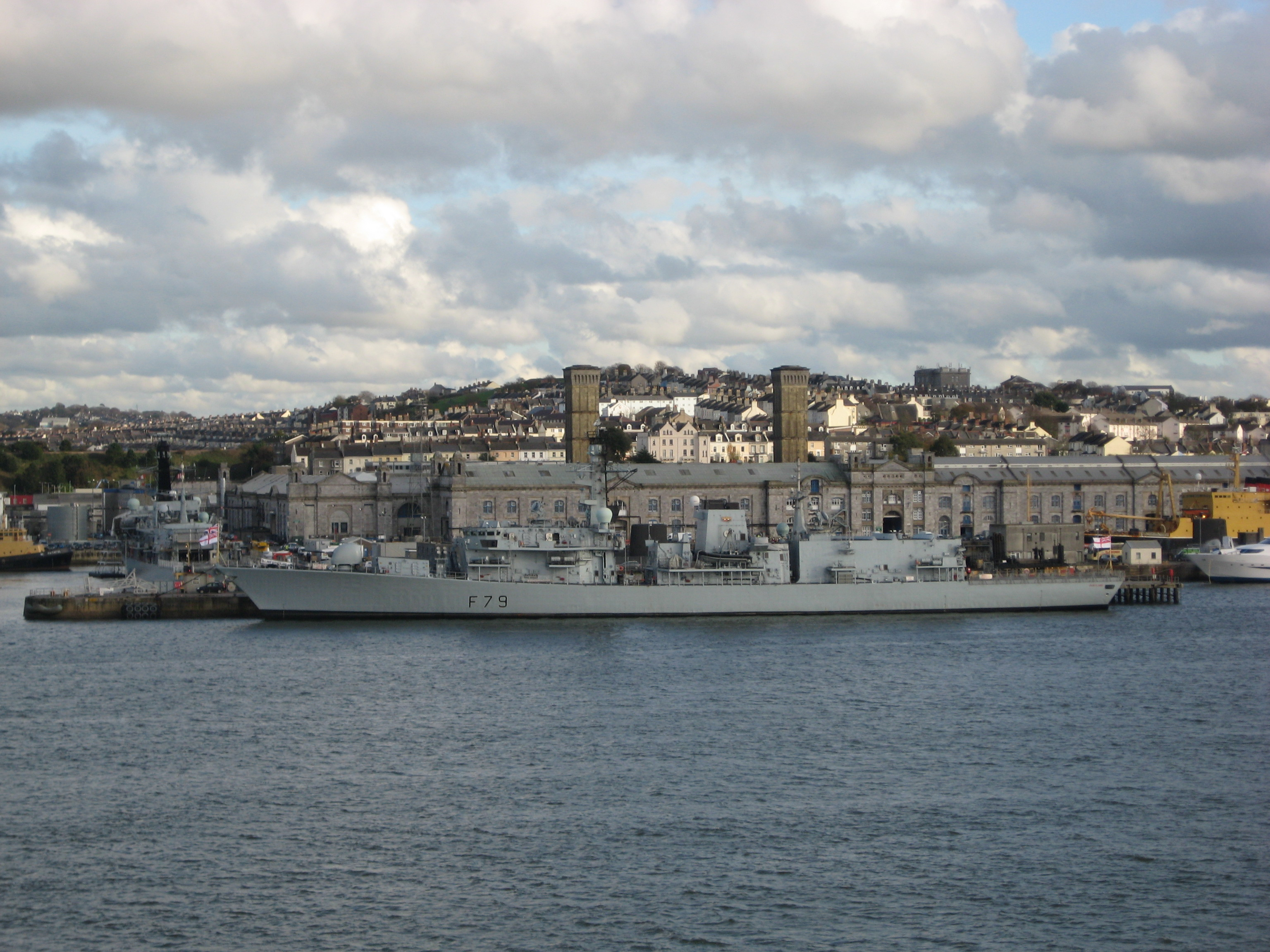
HMS Portland moored at HMNB Devonport

Plymouth Sutton and Devonport is a constituency in Devon in South West England. It covers the city centre of Plymouth and its surrounding neighbourhoods, including Devonport, Stonehouse, Lipson, Stoke, Keyham, Milehouse, Mannamead, Compton, Efford, Peverell and Hartley.

Plymouth is a port city with a maritime history. Its importance as a naval base and centre for shipbuilding made it a target for the Luftwaffe during World War II and much of the city was destroyed in the Plymouth Blitz. As a result, the city underwent significant redevelopment after the war. This constituency contains HMNB Devonport, the largest naval base in Western Europe. The University of Plymouth, located in the city centre, has around 18,000 students. Much of the constituency consists of dense terraced housing, largely built to accommodate civilian dockyard workers. Many areas are highly-deprived, particularly in the city centre, in Devonport and in Efford, a large, post-war council estate. The northern suburb of Hartley is mostly affluent. House prices across the constituency are considerably lower than the regional and UK averages.

Plymouth Sutton and Devonport has a large student population and a low proportion of retirees. Residents have low levels of income and homeownership and the child poverty rate is above-average. They are generally well-educated and a high proportion work in the manufacturing, tourism and defence sectors. The percentage of residents claiming unemployment benefits is above-average. White people made up 90% of the population at the 2021 census.

Most of this constituency is represented by the Labour Party at the local city council, although some Reform UK and Green Party representatives were elected at the most recent council election. An estimated 52% of voters in Plymouth Sutton and Devonport supported leaving the European Union in the 2016 referendum, identical to the UK-wide figure.

== Boundaries ==
Map of 2010 to 2024 boundaries

=== 2010–2024 ===
The City of Plymouth wards of:

- Compton, Devonport, Stonehouse, Drake (which includes the University and Mutley), Efford and Lipson, Peverell, St Peter and the Waterfront, Stoke, and Sutton and Mount Gould.

=== 2024–present ===
As above less polling districts KC and KD of Peverell ward.

Further to the 2023 periodic review of Westminster constituencies which came into effect for the 2024 general election, the composition of the constituency was reduced slightly in order to bring the electorate within the permitted range by transferring north-western parts of Peverell ward to Plymouth Moor View. The name of the constituency was changed to remove the comma.

== History ==
History of boundaries

The 2007 review by the Boundary Commission for England recommended the creation of this seat and Plymouth Moor View, which was duly approved by Parliament. It is largely based on the former Plymouth Sutton. To this is added smaller parts of the former Plymouth Devonport seat.

History of results

Results for the UK Commons seat named and for Plymouth Sutton and Devonport

This constituency was won on creation in 2010 by a Conservative, Oliver Colvile. In 2015, against opinion polls for losing, Colvile held it (but narrowly) over the Labour candidate Luke Pollard. The 2015 result gave the seat the 7th most marginal majority of the Conservative Party's 331 seats by percentage of majority.

In 2017, Pollard defeated Colvile to gain the seat with a majority of 6,807; originally, the majority was declared as 6,002, but a spreadsheet error meant the votes from the Efford and Lipson wards were not included in the declaration on the night of the count. Additionally about 35,000 postal voters received two polling cards, and some postal votes were not sent out.

== Members of Parliament ==
Election	Member	Party
2010	Oliver Colvile	Conservative
2017	Luke Pollard	Labour Co-op

== Elections ==
=== Elections in the 2020s ===
General election 2024: Plymouth Sutton and Devonport
Party	Candidate	Votes	%	±%
Labour Co-op	Luke Pollard	20,795	49.4	+1.0
Reform	Peter Gold	7,467	17.7	+12.0
Conservative	Gareth Streeter	6,873	16.3	–21.7
Green	Cam Hayward	3,186	7.6	+4.6
Liberal Democrats	Holly Greenberry-Pullen	2,441	5.8	+0.9
Independent	Chaz Singh	619	1.5	N/A
Workers Party	Guy Haywood	311	0.7	N/A
TUSC	Alex Moore	220	0.5	N/A
Socialist Labour	Robert Hawkins	183	0.4	N/A
Majority		13,328	31.7	+22.7
Turnout		42,095	55.9	–11.1
Registered electors		75,313		
Labour Co-op hold		Swing		

=== Elections in the 2010s ===
2019 notional result
Party	Vote	%
Labour	23,847	48.4
Conservative	18,725	38.0
Brexit Party	2,799	5.7
Liberal Democrats	2,416	4.9
Green	1,476	3.0
Turnout	49,263	67.0
Electorate	73,495	

General election 2019: Plymouth Sutton and Devonport
Party	Candidate	Votes	%	±%
Labour Co-op	Luke Pollard	25,461	47.9	–5.4
Conservative	Rebecca Smith	20,704	38.9	–1.1
Brexit Party	Ann Widdecombe	2,909	5.5	N/A
Liberal Democrats	Graham Reed	2,545	4.8	+2.4
Green	James Ellwood	1,557	2.9	+1.7
Majority		4,757	9.0	–4.3
Turnout		53,176	68.3	+1.3
Registered electors		77,852		
Labour Co-op hold		Swing	–2.2	

General election 2017: Plymouth Sutton and Devonport
Party	Candidate	Votes	%	±%
Labour Co-op	Luke Pollard	27,283	53.3	+16.6
Conservative	Oliver Colvile	20,476	40.0	+2.2
UKIP	Richard Ellison	1,364	2.7	–11.3
Liberal Democrats	Henrietta Bewley	1,244	2.4	–1.8
Green	Dan Sheaff	604	1.2	–5.9
Independent	Danny Bamping	237	0.5	N/A
Majority		6,807	13.3	N/A
Turnout		51,208	67.0	+1.5
Labour Co-op gain from Conservative		Swing	+7.2	

General election 2015: Plymouth Sutton and Devonport
Party	Candidate	Votes	%	±%
Conservative	Oliver Colvile	18,120	37.8	+3.5
Labour Co-op	Luke Pollard	17,597	36.7	+5.0
UKIP	Roy Kettle	6,731	14.0	+7.5
Green	Libby Brown	3,401	7.1	+5.0
Liberal Democrats	Graham Reed	2,008	4.2	–20.5
Communist	Laura-Jane Rossington	106	0.2	N/A
Majority		523	1.1	▼1.5
Turnout		47,963	65.5	▲3.7
Conservative hold		Swing	–0.8	

General election 2010: Plymouth Sutton and Devonport
Party	Candidate	Votes	%	±%
Conservative	Oliver Colvile	15,050	34.3	
Labour	Linda Gilroy	13,901	31.7	
Liberal Democrats	Judy Evans	10,829	24.7	
UKIP	Andrew Leigh	2,854	6.5	
Green	Tony Brown	904	2.1	
Independent	Brian Gerrish	223	0.5	
Socialist Labour	Robert Hawkins	123	0.3	
Majority		1,149	2.6	
Turnout		43,894	61.8	
Conservative win (new seat)				

== See also ==
- List of parliamentary constituencies in Devon

== Sources ==
- Plymouth Sutton and Devonport, UKPollingReport
