= Linda Gilroy =

British politician

Member of Parliament for Plymouth Sutton
- In office 1 May 1997 – 12 April 2010
- Preceded by: Gary Streeter
- Succeeded by: Oliver Colvile

Personal details
- Born: Linda Wade Jarvie; 19 July 1949 (age 77) Moffat, Scotland
- Party: Labour Co-operative
- Spouse: Bernard Gilroy
- Education: University of Edinburgh; University of Strathclyde

Linda Wade Gilroy (née Jarvie; born 19 July 1949) is a British Labour Co-operative politician who was the Member of Parliament (MP) for Plymouth Sutton from 1997 until her defeat at the 2010 general election by the Conservative Party candidate, Oliver Colvile.

== Early life ==
Born Linda Wade Jarvie and educated privately at the Maynard School in Exeter, Devon and then Stirling High School, before attending the University of Edinburgh where she was awarded a master's degree in history in 1971. She finished her education at the University of Strathclyde where she received a postgraduate diploma in secretarial studies in 1972.

She joined Age Concern Scotland (now Age UK), in 1972, leaving in 1979 as a deputy director to join the Gas Consumer Council as a regional manager for the South West of England, in which capacity she founded the Devon and Cornwall energy efficiency centre, before she left in 1996.

== Politics ==
She was elected as the secretary to the Plymouth Drake Constituency Labour Party in 1987–8, and was elected chairwoman of the Cornwall Labour Party for four years from 1990. She unsuccessfully contested Cornwall South East at the 1992 General Election where she finished in third place some 25,029 votes behind the sitting Conservative MP Robert Hicks. She also contested the European Parliament elections in 1994 when she was defeated at Devon and Plymouth.

Gilroy was selected to stand for Labour in the 1997 election through an all-women shortlist. She was elected to the House of Commons at the 1997 General Election for Plymouth Sutton with a majority of 9,440 and made her maiden speech on 27 October 1997. She was re-elected at the 2001 and the 2005 General Elections. Linda Gilroy contested the 2010 General Election in the newly created seat of Plymouth Sutton and Devonport, however she lost the seat to Oliver Colvile, who won the seat with a majority of just 1,149 votes.

In parliament she was a member of the European legislation select committee from 1997 until after the 2001 General Election when she was appointed as the Parliamentary Private Secretary to the Minister of State at the Office of the Deputy Prime Minister Nick Raynsford. She became a member of the defence select committee after the 2005 General Election, remaining a member until her defeat. As at August 2006 she had rebelled in just seven of 2,300 votes made. Her attendance record was 80%.

== Personal life ==
She lives in Plymouth beside Sutton Harbour and has been married to Bernard Gilroy since 1987.

Parliament of the United Kingdom
Preceded by Gary Streeter	Member of Parliament for Plymouth Sutton; 1997 – 2010	Succeeded by Oliver Colvile
