= Plymouth Sutton =

Former Parliamentary constituency in the United Kingdom, 1918-2010

Coordinates: 50.37°N 4.14°W

Plymouth, Sutton
- Former borough constituency for the House of Commons
- Boundary of Plymouth, Sutton in Devon for the 2005 general election

- Location of Devon within England
- County: Devon

1918–2010
- Seats: One
- Created from: Plymouth
- Replaced by: Plymouth Moor View, Plymouth Sutton and Devonport

Plymouth, Sutton was, from 1918 until 2010, a borough constituency represented in the House of Commons of the Parliament of the United Kingdom. It elected one Member of Parliament (MP) by the first past the post system of election.

== History ==
Plymouth Sutton covered parts of the city of Plymouth, in South West England, and was first contested at the 1918 general election. In a by-election in 1919, it became the second constituency in the UK (and the first in Great Britain) to elect a female MP: Nancy Astor became the first woman to take a seat in the House of Commons (the first female MP was the Sinn Féin member Constance Markievicz, who did not take her seat). Three of its MPs have been members of the Astor family. A more recent prominent MP was the flamboyant Conservative Alan Clark, who represented Plymouth Sutton from 1974 until 1992.

=== Abolition ===
Following the Fifth periodic review of Westminster constituencies by the Boundary Commission for England, constituencies in Plymouth were reorganised, with both Plymouth Sutton and Plymouth Devonport being replaced by new constituencies of Plymouth Sutton and Devonport and Plymouth Moor View from 2010. The vast majority of the Plymouth Sutton constituency became part of the new Plymouth Sutton and Devonport constituency.

== Boundaries ==
1918–1950: The County Borough of Plymouth wards of Charles, Compton, Friary, Laira, St Andrew, Sutton, and Vintry.

1950–1951: The County Borough of Plymouth wards of Charles, Compton, Crownhill, Drake, Friary, Laira, Mutley, St Andrew, Sutton, Valletort, and Vintry, and the parish of Bickleigh in the Rural District of Plympton St Mary.

1951–1955: The County Borough of Plymouth wards of Charles, Compton, Crownhill, Drake, Efford, Friary, Mount Gold, St Andrew and Sutton.

1955–1974: The County Borough of Plymouth wards of Charles, Compton, Crownhill, Efford, Friary, Mount Gould, Peverell, Sutton, Tamerton, and Trelawney.

1974–1983: The County Borough of Plymouth wards of Crownhill, Efford, Mount Gould, Plympton Erle, Plympton St Mary, Plymstock Dunstone, Plymstock Radford, and Sutton.

1983–1997: The City of Plymouth wards of Efford, Eggbuckland, Mount Gould, Plympton Erle, Plympton St Mary, Plymstock Dunstone, and Plymstock Radford.

1997–2010: The City of Plymouth wards of Compton, Drake, Efford, Mount Gould, St Peter, Stoke, Sutton, and Trelawny.

The 1997 boundary changes were highly favourable to Labour in this constituency: what had been a safe Conservative seat became a marginal seat. As such the seat from 1997 until 2010 was closer in its wards to the defunct marginal seat of Plymouth Drake.

== Members of Parliament ==
Election	Member	Party
1918	Waldorf Astor	Conservative
1919 by-election	Nancy Astor	Conservative
1945	Lucy Middleton	Labour
1951	Jakie Astor	Conservative
1959	Ian Fraser	Conservative
1966	David Owen	Labour
Feb 1974	Alan Clark	Conservative
1992	Gary Streeter	Conservative
1997	Linda Gilroy	Labour
2010	constituency abolished: see Plymouth Moor View & Plymouth Sutton and Devonport	

== Elections ==
=== Elections in the 1910s ===
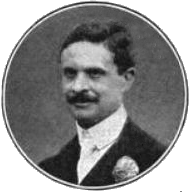
Waldorf Astor

General election 1918: Plymouth Sutton Electorate 43,444
Party		Candidate	Votes	%	±%
C	Unionist	Waldorf Astor	17,091	65.9	
	Labour	William Thomas Gay	5,334	20.6	
	Liberal	Sidney Ransom	3,488	13.5	
Majority			11,757	45.3	
Turnout			25,913	59.6	
	Unionist win (new seat)				
C indicates candidate endorsed by the coalition government.

1919 Plymouth Sutton by-election
Party		Candidate	Votes	%	±%
C	Unionist	Nancy Astor	14,495	51.9	−14.0
	Labour	William Thomas Gay	9,292	33.3	+12.7
	Liberal	Isaac Foot	4,139	14.8	+1.3
Majority			5,203	18.6	−26.7
Turnout			27,926		
	Unionist hold		Swing	-13.3	
C indicates candidate endorsed by the coalition government.

=== Elections in the 1920s ===
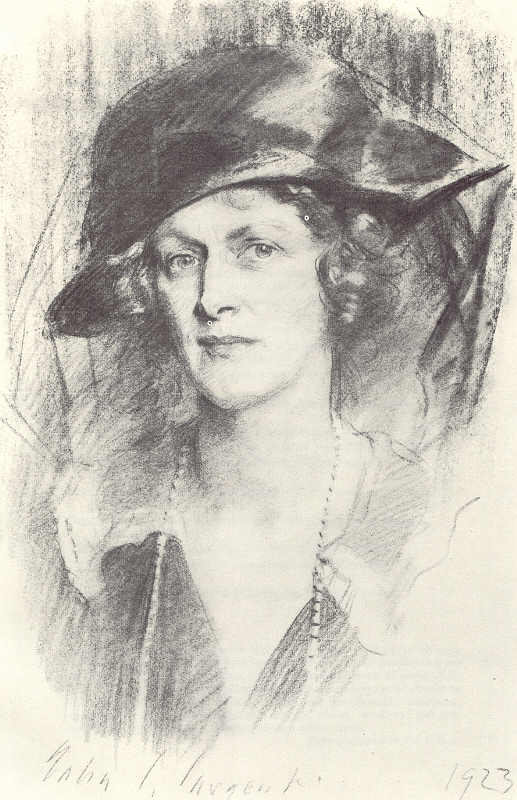
Nancy Astor

General election 1922: Plymouth Sutton
Party	Candidate	Votes	%	±%
Unionist	Nancy Astor	13,924	47.4	−18.5
Labour	Frederick George Woulfe-Brenan	10,831	36.8	+16.2
Ind. Unionist	Hugh Wansey Bayly	4,643	15.8	New
Majority		3,093	10.6	−34.7
Turnout		29,398	78.0	+18.4
Unionist hold		Swing		

General election 1923: Plymouth Sutton
Party	Candidate	Votes	%	±%
Unionist	Nancy Astor	16,114	54.5	+7.1
Labour	Frederick George Woulfe-Brenan	13,438	45.5	+8.7
Majority		2,676	9.0	−1.6
Turnout		29,552	77.9	−0.1
Unionist hold		Swing	-0.8	

General election 1924: Plymouth Sutton
Party	Candidate	Votes	%	±%
Unionist	Nancy Astor	18,174	58.1	+3.6
Labour	Frederick George Woulfe-Brenan	13,095	41.9	−3.6
Majority		5,079	16.2	+7.2
Turnout		31,269	81.6	+3.7
Unionist hold		Swing		

General election 1929: Plymouth Sutton
Party	Candidate	Votes	%	±%
Unionist	Nancy Astor	16,625	43.2	−15.9
Labour	William Westwood	16,414	42.7	+0.8
Liberal	Thomas Henry Aggett	5,430	14.1	New
Majority		211	0.5	−15.7
Turnout		38,469	81.1	−0.5
Unionist hold		Swing	-7.8	

=== Elections in the 1930s ===
General election 1931: Plymouth Sutton Electorate 47,862
Party	Candidate	Votes	%	±%
Conservative	Nancy Astor	24,277	63.3	+20.1
Labour	George Ward	14,073	36.7	−6.0
Majority		10,204	26.6	+26.1
Turnout		38,350	80.1	−1.0
Conservative hold		Swing		

General election 1935: Plymouth Sutton Electorate 47,540
Party	Candidate	Votes	%	±%
Conservative	Nancy Astor	21,491	58.3	−5.0
Labour	George Ward	15,394	41.7	+5.0
Majority		6,097	16.6	−10.0
Turnout		37,425	77.6	−3.5
Conservative hold		Swing		

General Election 1939–40: Another General Election was required to take place before the end of 1940. The political parties had been making preparations for an election to take place and by the Autumn of 1939, the following candidates had been selected;

- Conservative: Nancy Astor
- Labour: Lucy Middleton

=== Elections in the 1940s ===
General election 1945: Plymouth Sutton Electorate 41,493
Party	Candidate	Votes	%	±%
Labour	Lucy Middleton	15,417	51.6	+9.9
Conservative	Laurence Douglas Grand	10,738	36.0	−22.3
Liberal	Joan Arundell Gaved	3,695	12.4	New
Majority		4,679	15.6	N/A
Turnout		29,850	71.9	−5.7
Labour gain from Conservative		Swing		

=== Elections in the 1950s ===
General election 1950: Plymouth Sutton
Party	Candidate	Votes	%	±%
Labour	Lucy Middleton	27,512	47.73	
Conservative	Jakie Astor	26,588	46.13	
Liberal	Kenneth Henry B Major	3,541	6.14	
Majority		924	1.60	
Turnout		57,641	86.40	
Labour hold		Swing		

General election 1951: Plymouth Sutton
Party	Candidate	Votes	%	±%
Conservative	Jakie Astor	28,908	50.62	
Labour	Lucy Middleton	28,198	49.38	
Majority		710	1.24	N/A
Turnout		57,106	85.37	
Conservative gain from Labour		Swing		

General election 1955: Plymouth Sutton
Party	Candidate	Votes	%	±%
Conservative	Jakie Astor	30,051	53.38	
Labour	Lucy Middleton	26,241	46.62	
Majority		3,810	6.76	
Turnout		56,292	78.88	
Conservative hold		Swing		

General election 1959: Plymouth Sutton
Party	Candidate	Votes	%	±%
Conservative	Ian Fraser	32,752	55.75	
Labour	Julian D. Richards	25,991	44.52	
Majority		6,761	11.23	
Turnout		58,743	79.30	
Conservative hold		Swing		

=== Elections in the 1960s ===
General election 1964: Plymouth Sutton
Party	Candidate	Votes	%	±%
Conservative	Ian Fraser	24,722	43.82	
Labour	John Dunwoody	24,312	43.09	
Liberal	Graham Cocks	7,383	13.09	New
Majority		410	0.73	
Turnout		56,417	76.66	
Conservative hold		Swing		

General election 1966: Plymouth Sutton
Party	Candidate	Votes	%	±%
Labour	David Owen	31,567	54.51	
Conservative	Ian Fraser	26,345	45.49	
Majority		5,222	9.02	N/A
Turnout		57,912	78.90	
Labour gain from Conservative		Swing		

=== Elections in the 1970s ===
General election 1970: Plymouth Sutton
Party	Candidate	Votes	%	±%
Labour	David Owen	29,383	50.64	
Conservative	John M. Goss	28,636	49.36	
Majority		747	1.28	
Turnout		58,019	72.27	
Labour hold		Swing		

New constituency boundaries came into effect in time for the following election in February 1974.

General election February 1974: Plymouth Sutton
Party	Candidate	Votes	%	±%
Conservative	Alan Clark	21,649	45.22	
Labour	BW Fletcher	13,545	28.29	
Liberal	Simon Godfrey Banks	12,683	26.49	New
Majority		8,104	16.93	N/A
Turnout		47,876	79.07	
Conservative gain from Labour		Swing		

General election October 1974: Plymouth Sutton
Party	Candidate	Votes	%	±%
Conservative	Alan Clark	20,457	44.61	
Labour	Julian Priestley	15,269	33.30	
Liberal	Simon Godfrey Banks	10,131	22.09	
Majority		5,188	11.31	
Turnout		45,858	75.17	
Conservative hold		Swing	-2.8	

General election 1979: Plymouth Sutton
Party	Candidate	Votes	%	±%
Conservative	Alan Clark	28,892	54.80	
Labour	Julian Priestley	17,605	33.39	
Liberal	J Scannell	6,226	11.81	
Majority		11,287	21.41	
Turnout		52,723	76.95	
Conservative hold		Swing		

=== Elections in the 1980s ===
General election 1983: Plymouth Sutton
Party	Candidate	Votes	%	±%
Conservative	Alan Clark	25,203	55.12	
Liberal	Anthony Puttick	13,516	29.56	
Labour	Frances Holland	6,358	14.30	
Ecology	Stephen Shaw	470	1.03	New
Majority		11,687	25.56	
Turnout		45,726	76.35	
Conservative hold		Swing		

General election 1987: Plymouth Sutton
Party	Candidate	Votes	%	±%
Conservative	Alan Clark	23,187	45.76	
Liberal	Bruce Tidy	19,174	37.84	
Labour	Ralph Maddern	8,310	16.40	
Majority		4,013	7.92	
Turnout		50,674	79.03	
Conservative hold		Swing	−3.8	

=== Elections in the 1990s ===
General election 1992: Plymouth Sutton
Party	Candidate	Votes	%	±%
Conservative	Gary Streeter	27,070	49.5	+3.7
Labour	Andrew Pawley	15,120	27.6	+11.2
Liberal Democrats	Julian P. Brett-Freeman	12,291	22.5	−15.3
Natural Law	Jeremy J. Bowler	256	0.5	New
Majority		11,950	21.9	+14.0
Turnout		54,737	81.2	+2.2
Conservative hold		Swing	−3.8	

General election 1997: Plymouth Sutton
Party	Candidate	Votes	%	±%
Labour Co-op	Linda Gilroy	23,881	50.1	+11.3
Conservative	Andrew Crisp	14,441	30.3	−11.5
Liberal Democrats	Steve Melia	6,613	13.9	+0.7
Referendum	Tim Hanbury	1,654	3.5	New
UKIP	Roger Bullock	499	1.1	New
Plymouth First Group	Kevin Kelway	396	0.8	New
Natural Law	Frank Lyons	168	0.4	−0.1
Majority		9,440	19.8	N/A
Turnout		47,652	67.4	−13.8
Labour gain from Conservative		Swing	+11.4	

=== Elections in the 2000s ===
General election 2001: Plymouth, Sutton
Party	Candidate	Votes	%	±%
Labour Co-op	Linda Gilroy	19,827	50.7	+0.6
Conservative	Oliver Colvile	12,310	31.5	+1.2
Liberal Democrats	Alan Connett	5,605	14.3	+0.4
UKIP	Alan Whitton	970	2.5	+1.4
Socialist Labour	Henry Leary	361	0.9	New
Majority		7,517	19.2	−0.6
Turnout		39,073	57.1	−10.3
Labour Co-op hold		Swing	−0.3	

General election 2005: Plymouth, Sutton
Party	Candidate	Votes	%	±%
Labour Co-op	Linda Gilroy	15,497	40.6	−10.1
Conservative	Oliver Colvile	11,388	29.8	−1.7
Liberal Democrats	Karen Gillard	8,685	22.7	+8.4
UKIP	Robert Cumming	2,392	6.3	+3.8
Socialist Labour	Rob Hawkins	230	0.6	−0.3
Majority		4,109	10.8	−8.4
Turnout		38,192	56.8	−0.3
Labour Co-op hold		Swing	−4.2	

== See also ==
- List of parliamentary constituencies in Devon

== Sources ==
- Craig, F. W. S. (1983) [1969]. British parliamentary election results 1918–1949 (3rd ed.). Chichester: Parliamentary Research Services. ISBN 0-900178-06-X.
