= Charles Colvile (commentator) =

English cricket commentator and journalist

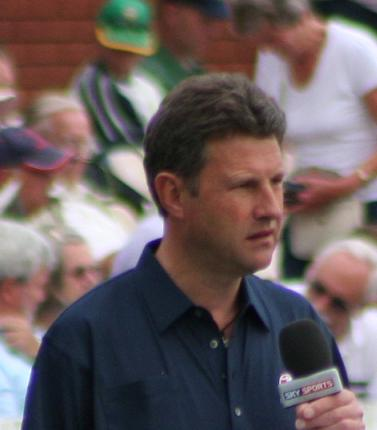
Colvile at the Taunton Cricket Ground working for Sky Sports

Charles Edward Neate Colvile (born 29 March 1955, in Westfield, Woking, Surrey) is a cricket commentator, interviewer, and journalist for Sky Sports, especially for UK-based domestic matches.

== Early life ==
Colvile was educated at Westminster School, an independent school in London.

== Life and career ==
Colvile is a cricket commentator, interviewer, and journalist for Sky Sports, primarily for English domestic matches. He has worked for Sky since 1990 and has presented some major series for them from various grounds, such as the 1990/91 Ashes series in Australia, the 1994 England tour to the West Indies and the 1995/6 England tour to South Africa. Before Mark Nicholas signed up as anchorman for Sky Sports in 1996 Colvile was the senior cricket presenter. The majority of his work now is presenting live internationals not involving England, presenting England highlights and heading up Sky's domestic cricket coverage. Unlike the majority of cricket commentators, Colvile never played cricket professionally (sometimes a source of amusement for some of his fellow TV pundits), but is instead a respected professional sports commentator. He has however always been an enthusiastic club cricketer, playing in the Surrey Championship for Pyrford Cricket Club since the 1970s.

Colvile's catchphrase is "Got him" when a bowler takes a wicket – this became folklore when Angus Fraser ripped through the West Indies in the 1994 Barbados Test match live on Sky TV. He even has his own Facebook group dedicated to him by fans. Before joining Sky, Colvile was one of several sports journalists who covered the sports slots just before the half-hours in BBC Radio 4's Today programme. In 2005, Cricinfo released copies of a question and answer article by The Wisden Cricketer on cricket commentators that contained both positive and negative views on Colvile's commentating.

Colvile is a member of Marylebone Cricket Club, as was his brother, former MP Oliver Colvile.

Before becoming a sports presenter, Charles Colvile was a newsreader and continuity announcer for BBC Radio 4.
