= Michael Foot memorial =

Coordinates: 50.3781°N 4.1281°W

A memorial to Michael Foot is situated in Freedom Fields Park in Plymouth, Devon. Foot was born in Plymouth, and served as Member of Parliament for Plymouth Devonport between 1945 and 1955. The memorial stands opposite the house where Foot was born.

The memorial consists of three granite blocks, a central tall block is marked with "Michael Mackintosh Foot 1913–2010", with two smaller blocks that can be used as seats. The three blocks are carved with the words "orator", "democratic socialist" and "journalist". The memorial cost £50,000 to erect and was paid for with fundraising from public donations.

The memorial was vandalised with Nazi iconography in the wake of the 2016 United Kingdom European Union membership referendum in July 2016 - Foot had been one of the leaders of the campaign to leave the Union in the referendum held in 1975.
