= Greenwich (London County Council constituency) =

London County Council constituency

- Former constituency for the London County Council

Former constituency
- Created: 1889
- Abolished: 1965
- Member(s): 2 (to 1949); 3 (from 1949)

Greenwich was a constituency used for elections to the London County Council between 1889 and the council's abolition, in 1965. The seat shared boundaries with the UK Parliament constituency of the same name.

== Councillors ==
Year	Name	Party	Name	Party	Name	Party
1889	Richard Jackson	Progressive	George Lidgett	Progressive	Two seats until 1949	
1895	Henry Thomas Banning	Moderate	Ralph Gooding	Moderate	Two seats until 1949	
1898	Richard Jackson	Progressive	John Peppercorn	Progressive	Two seats until 1949	
1901	Richard Jackson	Progressive	Frederick William Warmington	Progressive	Two seats until 1949	
1907	Ion Hamilton Benn	Municipal Reform	Alexander Thynne	Municipal Reform	Two seats until 1949	
1910	Rowland Clegg-Hill	Municipal Reform	George Hume	Municipal Reform	Two seats until 1949	
1919	Ernest Dence	Municipal Reform	George Hume	Municipal Reform	Two seats until 1949	
1922	Ernest Dence	Municipal Reform	George Rowland Hill	Municipal Reform	Two seats until 1949	
1922	Ernest Dence	Municipal Reform	Madeline Hill	Municipal Reform	Two seats until 1949	
1928	Ernest Dence	Municipal Reform	Cuthbert Edward Hunter	Municipal Reform	Two seats until 1949	
1934	Esther Rickards	Labour	Walter Windsor	Labour	Two seats until 1949	
1937	Esther Rickards	Labour	Bernard Sullivan	Labour	Two seats until 1949	
1946	Harold Gibbons	Labour	Bernard Sullivan	Labour	Two seats until 1949	
1948	Johanna Gollogly	Labour	Bernard Sullivan	Labour	Two seats until 1949	
1949	Johanna Gollogly	Labour	Bernard Sullivan	Labour	Arthur Chrisp	Labour
1955	Thomas Beacham	Labour	Peggy Middleton	Labour	Arthur Chrisp	Labour
1958	Julia Johnson	Labour	Peggy Middleton	Labour	Arthur Chrisp	Labour

== Election results ==
1889 London County Council election: Greenwich
Party	Candidate	Votes	%	±%
Progressive	George Lidgett	3,102		
Progressive	Richard Jackson	3,025		
Moderate	Thomas Boord	2,440		
Moderate	Stuart Knill	2,390		
Progressive win (new seat)				
Progressive win (new seat)				

1892 London County Council election: Greenwich
Party	Candidate	Votes	%	±%
Progressive	Richard Jackson	3,667		
Progressive	George Lidgett	3,628		
Moderate	William Fox Batley	3,168		
Moderate	George Maryon-Wilson	3,080		
Progressive hold		Swing		
Progressive hold		Swing		

1895 London County Council election: Greenwich
Party	Candidate	Votes	%	±%
Moderate	Henry Thomas Banning	3,284		
Moderate	Ralph Gooding	3,258		
Progressive	Richard Jackson	3,131		
Progressive	George Lidgett	2,983		
Ind. Labour Party	Pete Curran	391		
Moderate gain from Progressive		Swing		
Moderate gain from Progressive		Swing		

1898 London County Council election: Greenwich
Party	Candidate	Votes	%	±%
Progressive	Richard Jackson	3,898		
Progressive	John Peppercorn	3,249		
Moderate	Edward George Bootle-Wilbraham	3,194		
Moderate	W. E. Ball	3,190		
Ind. Labour Party	J. M. McCarthy	689		
Progressive gain from Moderate		Swing		
Progressive gain from Moderate		Swing		

1901 London County Council election: Greenwich
Party	Candidate	Votes	%	±%
Progressive	Richard Jackson	4,242	28.5	+1.1
Progressive	Frederick William Warmington	3,937	26.5	+3.7
Conservative	John Edward Shaw	3,209	21.6	−0.9
Conservative	William Kent Lemon	3,178	21.4	−1.0
Independent	James Ellis	315	2.1	n/a
Progressive hold		Swing		
Progressive hold		Swing	+1.7	

1904 London County Council election: Greenwich
Party	Candidate	Votes	%	±%
Progressive	Richard Jackson	Unopposed	N/A	
Progressive	Frederick William Warmington	Unopposed	N/A	
Progressive hold		Swing		
Progressive hold		Swing		

1907 London County Council election: Greenwich
Party	Candidate	Votes	%	±%
Municipal Reform	Ion Hamilton Benn	6,217		
Municipal Reform	Alexander Thynne	5,991		
Progressive	D. McCall	3,727		
Progressive	J. Wilson	3,545		
Majority				
Municipal Reform gain from Progressive		Swing		
Municipal Reform gain from Progressive		Swing		

1910 London County Council election: Greenwich
Party	Candidate	Votes	%	±%
Municipal Reform	Rowland Clegg-Hill	4,574	28.6	
Municipal Reform	George Hume	4,569	28.6	
Progressive	Thomas Ford	2,919	17.3	
Progressive	John Belcher Allpass	2,768	17.3	
Labour	Ernest Gilbert	1,161	7.3	
Majority				
Municipal Reform hold		Swing		
Municipal Reform hold		Swing		

1913 London County Council election: Greenwich
Party	Candidate	Votes	%	±%
Municipal Reform	George Hume	4,815	26.0	−2.6
Municipal Reform	Rowland Clegg-Hill	4,787	25.8	−2.8
Progressive	Alfred Henry Scott	4,486	24.2	+6.9
Progressive	Hugh Moulton	4,463	24.1	+6.8
Majority		301	1.6	
Municipal Reform hold		Swing	-4.8	
Municipal Reform hold		Swing		

1919 London County Council election: Greenwich
Party	Candidate	Votes	%	±%
Municipal Reform	Ernest Dence	Unopposed	n/a	n/a
Municipal Reform	George Hume	Unopposed	n/a	n/a
Municipal Reform hold		Swing	n/a	
Municipal Reform hold		Swing	n/a	

1922 London County Council election: Greenwich
Party	Candidate	Votes	%	±%
Municipal Reform	Ernest Dence	9,412	28.3	n/a
Municipal Reform	George Rowland Hill	9,367	28.2	n/a
Labour	Hyacinth Morgan	7,332	22.0	n/a
Labour	J. G. Davenport	7,145	21.4	n/a
Majority				n/a
Municipal Reform hold		Swing	n/a	
Municipal Reform hold		Swing	n/a	

1925 London County Council election: Greenwich
Party	Candidate	Votes	%	±%
Municipal Reform	Ernest Dence	8,573		
Municipal Reform	Madeline Hill	8,351		
Labour	Hyacinth Morgan	8,032		
Labour	J. Round	7,758		
Majority				
Municipal Reform hold		Swing		
Municipal Reform hold		Swing		

1928 London County Council election: Greenwich
Party	Candidate	Votes	%	±%
Municipal Reform	Ernest Dence	9,807		
Municipal Reform	Cuthbert Edward Hunter	9,684		
Labour	Thomas Henry Philip Beacham	8,443		
Labour	Harold Henry Gibbons	8,280		
Majority				
Municipal Reform hold		Swing		
Municipal Reform hold		Swing		

1931 London County Council election: Greenwich
Party	Candidate	Votes	%	±%
Municipal Reform	Ernest Dence	9,463		
Municipal Reform	Cuthbert Edward Hunter	9,387		
Labour	Thomas Beacham	7,003		
Labour	Harold Gibbons	6,736		
Communist	J. T. Bellamy	569		n/a
Communist	J. Cronin	243		n/a
Majority				
Municipal Reform hold		Swing		
Municipal Reform hold		Swing		

1934 London County Council election: Greenwich
Party	Candidate	Votes	%	±%
Labour	Esther Rickards	10,754		
Labour	Walter Windsor	10,616		
Municipal Reform	Ernest Dence	9,253		
Municipal Reform	C. Drage	9,086		
Majority				
Labour gain from Municipal Reform		Swing		
Labour gain from Municipal Reform		Swing		

1937 London County Council election: Greenwich
Party	Candidate	Votes	%	±%
Labour	Esther Rickards	11,682		
Labour	Bernard Sullivan	11,457		
Municipal Reform	J. H. Barrington	10,793		
Municipal Reform	E. R. Mayer	10,674		
Majority				
Labour hold		Swing		
Labour hold		Swing		

1946 London County Council election: Greenwich
Party	Candidate	Votes	%	±%
Labour	Harold Gibbons	7,733		
Labour	Bernard Sullivan	7,500		
Conservative	W. F. Mills	5,415		
Conservative	S. M. Roberts	5,245		
Majority				
Labour hold		Swing		
Labour hold		Swing		

1949 London County Council election: Greenwich
Party	Candidate	Votes	%	±%
Labour	Johanna Gollogly	15,137		
Labour	Arthur Chrisp	14,447		
Labour	Bernard Sullivan	14,237		
Conservative	W. F. Mills	13,527		
Conservative	W. Smith	12,840		
Conservative	R. E. A. Purkiss	12,731		
Labour hold		Swing		
Labour hold		Swing		
Labour win (new seat)				

1952 London County Council election: Greenwich
Party	Candidate	Votes	%	±%
Labour	Johanna Gollogly	17,835		
Labour	Arthur Chrisp	17,602		
Labour	Bernard Sullivan	17,437		
Conservative	William H. Bishop	11,227		
Conservative	H. P. Brooks	10,893		
Conservative	Humphry Berkeley	10,783		
Labour hold		Swing		
Labour hold		Swing		
Labour hold		Swing		

1955 London County Council election: Greenwich
Party	Candidate	Votes	%	±%
Labour	Arthur Chrisp	11,814		
Labour	Thomas Beacham	11,590		
Labour	Peggy Middleton	11,469		
Conservative	Dorothy Home	9,639		
Conservative	W. Smith	9,201		
Conservative	W. F. Mills	9,197		
Labour hold		Swing		
Labour hold		Swing		
Labour hold		Swing		

1958 London County Council election: Greenwich
Party	Candidate	Votes	%	±%
Labour	Arthur Chrisp	13,258		
Labour	Julia Johnson	12,816		
Labour	Peggy Middleton	12,606		
Conservative	Dorothy Home	7,040		
Conservative	A. C. Prothero	6,637		
Conservative	C. Shaw	6,518		
Labour hold		Swing		
Labour hold		Swing		
Labour hold		Swing		

1961 London County Council election: Greenwich
Party	Candidate	Votes	%	±%
Labour	Arthur Chrisp	14,280		
Labour	Peggy Middleton	13,990		
Labour	Julia Johnson	13,467		
Conservative	Rodney Holmes	9,515		
Conservative	C. Shipton	9,192		
Conservative	J. W. Tennant	8,961		
Liberal	G. Findlow	1,981		
Liberal	C. Lindsay	1,830		
Liberal	R. Hart	1,785		
Labour hold		Swing		
Labour hold		Swing		
Labour hold		Swing		
