= Boord =

Boord is a surname. Notable people with the surname include:

- Ray Boord (1908–1982), New Zealand politician
- Thomas Boord (1838–1912), British politician
  - Boord baronets, a title in the Baronetage of the United Kingdom created in 1896 for Thomas Boord
