= Mayor of Greenwich =

The mayor of Greenwich leads Greenwich Council.

The following were mayors of Greenwich, Greater London:

- Charles Stone, 1903–1904, 1906–1907, 1911–1912, and 1915–1920
- Ernest Dence, 1922-23
- Peggy Middleton, 1961–62
- John Austin, 1987-89
- Leo Fletcher, 2022–23
- Dominic Mbang, 2023–24
