= Joseph Reeves =

British politician

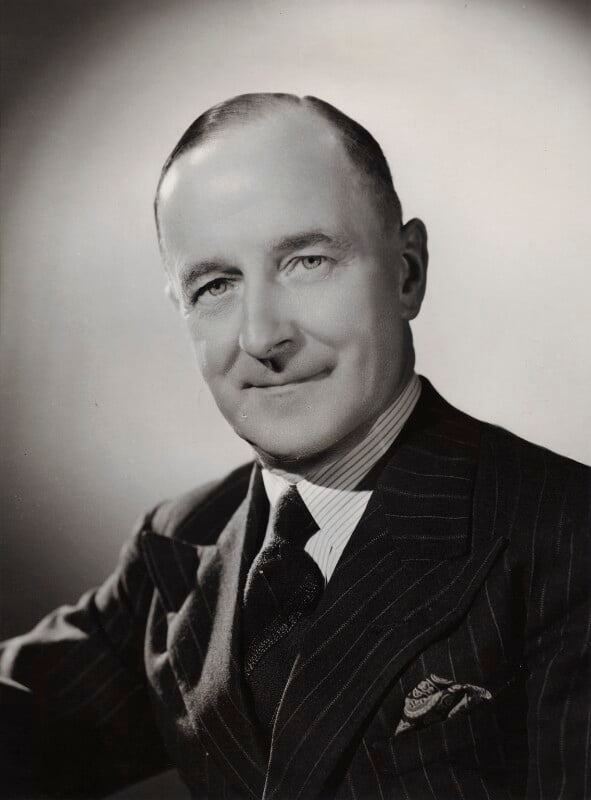
Reeves in 1947

Joseph Reeves (28 January 1888 – 8 March 1969) was a British Labour Party politician. He served as Member of Parliament for Greenwich between 1945 and 1959.

Early life

Reeves was born in Camberwell, London in 1888 to Walter Cookson and Ruth Reeves. His birth name was Joseph Cookson; it is unclear why or when he started using his mother's surname Reeves. His family were impoverished and Reeves left school aged 13. Reeves later credited this early awareness of the chasm between the lives of the poor and the lives of wealthy Edwardians with inspiring his interest in the Socialist Movement.

Having left school with a Labour Certificate, Reeves worked as an apprentice ticket, glass and sign writer for 5 years before starting his own sign writing business in his early twenties.

At the beginning of the First World War, Reeves was painting signage for Sainsbury's. He registered as a conscientious objector, successfully convincing a panel that military service went against his principles.

Politics

Reeves served as a Labour councillor on Deptford Borough Council between 1920 and 1949.

Reeves was founder and chairman of Camberwell Labour Party and vice-chairman of the Society for Improving Relations between Great Britain and the USSR. He served as secretary of the Royal Arsenal Co-operative Society's education committee. He was an Alderman of the Metropolitan Borough of Deptford. He fought Woolwich West in 1931 and Greenwich in 1935 without success before winning the Greenwich seat in the 1945 general election.

Whilst in Parliament, Reeves was a member of the Party's National Executive Committee 1946-53 and of the committee of inquiry into the BBC.

Reeves campaigned on a broad range of interests. His unsuccessful 1952 Private Members' bill on decriminalising abortion in the UK was the first serious attempt to enable British women to access safe and legal abortions. The "draft bill he crafted was a cautious document seeking only to reassure doctors they were legally permitted to perform abortions to save a woman’s life and her mental and physical health. It was quickly defeated in Parliament."

He retired as MP in 1959.

Personal life

Reeves' first wife, Lily, suffered from poor mental health and their marriage was unhappy, though they had two daughters, Iris and Josephine. Their marriage ended in divorce on the grounds of Lily's mental health.

Reeves married Gladys Holdup in 1940. Their daughter Rosemary was born in 1945.

Parliament of the United Kingdom
Preceded by George Hopwood Hume	Member of Parliament for Greenwich; 1945 – 1959	Succeeded by Richard Marsh
Party political offices
Preceded by Walter Green	Socialist societies representative of the Labour Party National Executive Committee; 1946–1953	Succeeded by Arthur Skeffington
