= William Angerstein =

British politician

- Lithograph of Angerstein in the late 19th century.

Member of Parliament for Greenwich
- In office 1859–1865

Personal details
- Born: 1811
- Died: 31 May 1897 (aged 85–86)
- Party: Liberal
- Spouse: Mary Ann Nettleship
- Parent(s): John Angerstein; Amelia Locke

William Angerstein (1811 – 31 May 1897) was a British Liberal MP.

At the 1859 general election, he was elected as Member of Parliament for Greenwich, and held his seat in the House of Commons until 1865. He was chosen High Sheriff of Norfolk in 1872.

He was the son of John Angerstein (1774 – 1858), MP for Camelford, 1796, and Greenwich, 1835. He was also the grandson of John Julius Angerstein.

Parliament of the United Kingdom
Preceded by Sir William Codrington; David Salomons	Member of Parliament for Greenwich; 1859–1865; With: David Salomons	Succeeded by David Salomons; Sir Charles Tilston Bright
