= Charles Stone (mayor) =

English solicitor who served as Mayor of Greenwich

Sir Charles Stone (20 August 1850 – 9 January 1931) was an English solicitor who served as Mayor of Greenwich through most of the First World War.

Stone was educated at the City of London School and was admitted a solicitor in 1872. He was elected an alderman of Greenwich in 1900 and served as Mayor of Greenwich in 1903–1904, 1906–1907, 1911–1912, and 1915–1920. For these services he was knighted in the 1920 New Year Honours.

In 1882, he married Alice Elizabeth Hart, daughter of Edward Hart. He died at his home in Blackheath.
