= Esther Rickards =

British surgeon and socialist activist (1893–1977)

Esther Rickards (13 July 1893 – 9 February 1977) was a British surgeon and politician.

Born in the Paddington area of London, Rickards' family were Jewish. In 1913, she, her sister and her cousin protested at the New West End Synagogue in support of women's suffrage.

Rickards' father was a veterinary surgeon, and she hoped to follow him into the profession. However, at the time, women were not permitted to train as vets, so she instead trained in medicine at the Regent Street Polytechnic, Birkbeck College, London School of Medicine and St Mary's Hospital, London. In 1923, she obtained her Master of Surgery qualification, an unusual achievement for a woman at the time, and in 1924 she was one of the first women accepted as a Fellow of the Royal College of Surgeons.

Early in her career, Rickards was a resident at St Mary's Hospital, where she developed a specialism in gynaecology. In 1926, Rickards was appointed as Woman Honorary Surgeon to Outpatients at the London Lock Hospital. During this period, she was influenced by Clayton Greene, Zachary Cope and C. A. Pannett. She next became an assistant medical officer for London County Council, covering Paddington.

Rickards was a socialist, and in 1930, she chaired the founding meeting of the Socialist Medical Association. The following year, the organisation affiliated to the Labour Party, and played a key role in establishing the party's policy of creating the National Health Service (NHS). Rickards personally focused on policy relating to maternity, in particular hoping to reduce the rates of mortality around childbirth, and sat on the party's Public Health Advisory Committee.

Rickards was elected to the London County Council in 1928, representing Greenwich for Labour. When the party won control of the council in 1934, she was involved in developing its health policy. She stood unsuccessfully for the party in Paddington North at the 1931 general election.

From 1947 until her retirement in 1971, Rickards served on the North West Metropolitan Regional Hospital Board and St Mary's Hospital Board of Governors. In 1966, she was made an Officer of the Order of the British Empire. After retirement, she was an honorary consulting surgeon at St Mary's.

When Rickards retired, she moved to Windsor, where she spent much of her time breeding Cocker Spaniels. She chaired the London Cocker Spaniel Society, revived the Windsor Dog Show, judged dog shows on an international basis, and was the first president of the European Spaniel Congress. She rescued the breed of Irish Water Spaniel from near extinction. She also worked on embroidery, making a presidential gown for the Royal College of Surgeons, and together with her sister Phoebe, amassed a large collection of recordings of Mozart and Haydn.

== Further Information ==
An interview with Rickards appeared in the Aberdeen Evening Express in 1973, in which she recounted her life, including her suffragette experiences. She stated that she was 'one of the violent suffragettes'
