= Peggy Middleton =

British politician

Peggy Arline Middleton (3 January 1916 – 26 August 1974) was a British politician who served on the Greater London Council (GLC).

Born in Bristol as Peggy Loughman, she was educated at Kingswood Grammar School. She worked for the British Broadcasting Corporation in its features department until 1940, then at Preston Record Office. After having children, she worked at Family Planning until 1950. She then qualified as a teacher at Borthwick College. She taught in Greenwich, where she led a campaign against comics, having found 11-year-olds in her class reading material she considered unsuitable. During this period, she also wrote for the New York-based National Guardian.

In 1952, Middleton was elected as a Labour Party member of Greenwich Metropolitan Borough Council. At the 1955 London County Council election, she was additionally elected as a councillor for Greenwich. In 1961/62, she served as Mayor of Greenwich, the youngest person at that time to have held the office. During that year, she was fined £1 for attending a Campaign for Nuclear Disarmament demonstration and refusing to move when asked by police, at which she claimed to have had her arm seized and twisted by the officers.

At the 1966 UK general election, Middleton stood in Tavistock, taking third place, with 20.2% of the vote.

In 1965, the London County Council was replaced by the GLC. Middleton remained a councillor for Greenwich, and in 1973 she was appointed as chair of the council's finance board. She died the following year, while still in office. In 1977, Peggy Middleton House was completed, providing office space for staff at the Royal Borough of Greenwich.

Civic offices
Preceded by Harry Tatman	Mayor of Greenwich; 1961–1962	Succeeded by Thomas E. Smith
