= 1873 Greenwich by-election =

UK Parliamentary by-election

The 1873 Greenwich by-election was fought on 2 August 1873. The by-election was fought due to the death of the incumbent MP of the Liberal Party, David Salomons. It was won by the Conservative candidate Thomas Boord.
