= Peter Rolt =

British businessman and politician

Peter Rolt (1798 – 3 September 1882) was a British businessman and Conservative Party politician.

The son of John David Rolt of and his wife Sophia née Butt, he was born in Deptford. Both of his grandfathers held senior positions in the town's Royal Dockyard. He entered business as a timber merchant and contractor. In 1820 he married Mary Brockelbank, daughter of Thomas Brockelbank, the managing director of the General Steam Navigation Company, and formed a shipping company, Brockelbank & Rolt, in partnership with his father in law.

In 1852 Rolt was chosen by the Conservative Party to contest the parliamentary constituency of Greenwich. The two-seat constituency, which included Rolt's home town of Deptford was held by two Liberal Party members of parliament. Rolt topped the poll and was elected to the Commons along with Montague Chambers of the Liberals.

In 1857 Rolt took over C.J. Mare and Company, an engineering and shipbuilding company owned by his son in law, Charles John Mare, who had become insolvent. He formed the Thames Ironworks and Shipbuilding and Engineering Company Ltd of which he became chairman. He resigned from parliament by accepting the office of Steward of the Manor of Hempholme.

Rolt devoted himself to his shipping and shipbuilding interests. He was an associate of fellow director, Lord Alan Spencer-Churchill in a number of ventures. He was Master of the Worshipful Company of Drapers and was created a count in the Nobility of Italy in 1871. He died at his home Trafalgar House in London's Regent's Park in 1882 aged 83.

Parliament of the United Kingdom
Preceded by David Salomons; Houston Stewart	Member of Parliament for Greenwich; 1852–1857; With: Montague Chambers	Succeeded by Montague Chambers; Sir William Codrington
