= David Salomons =

British politician (1797–1873)

Sir David Salomons Bt
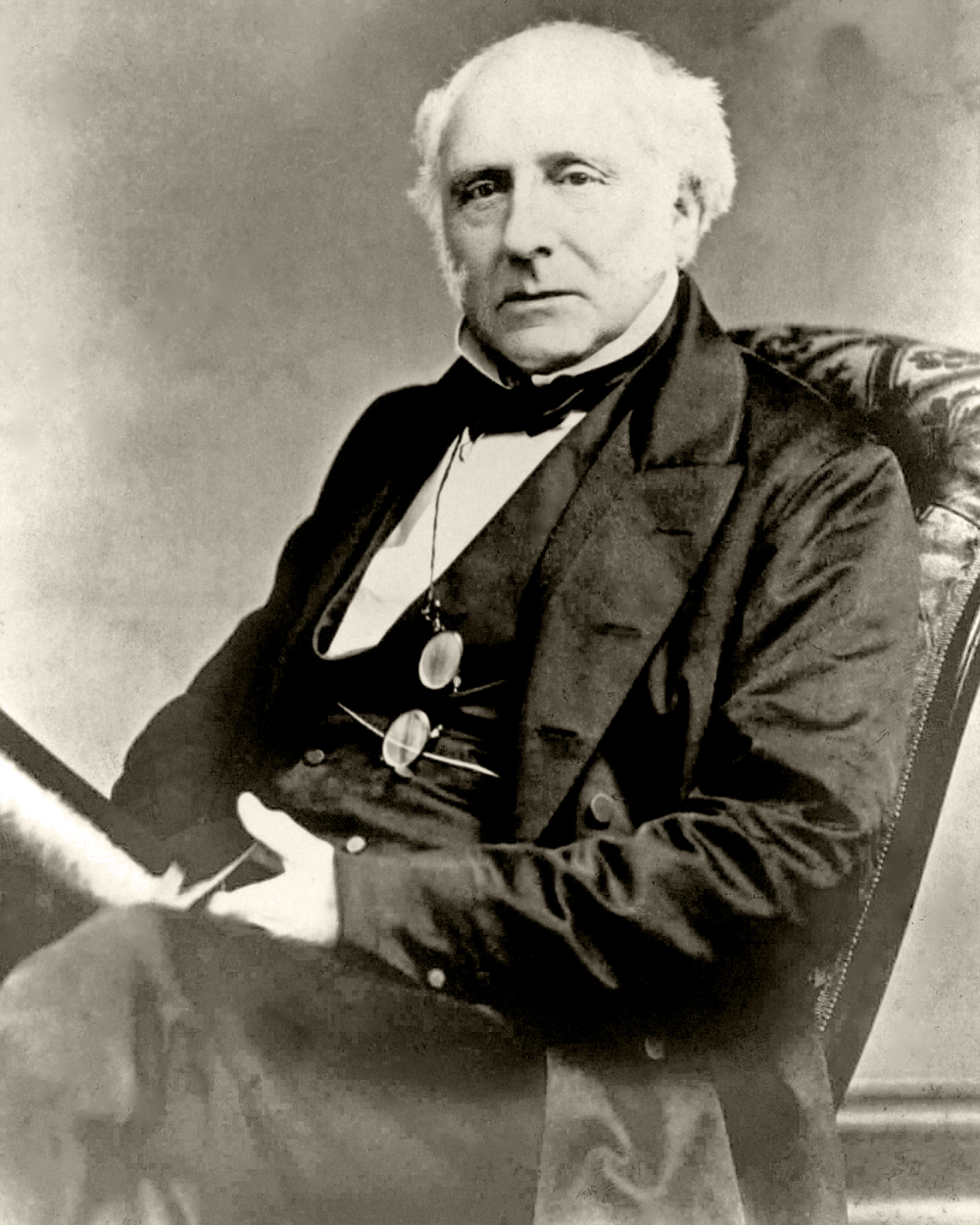

Member of Parliament for Greenwich
- In office 1851–1852 Serving with J. W. Deans Dundas and H. Stewart
- Preceded by: Edward George Barnard; James Whitley Deans Dundas
- Succeeded by: Peter Rolt; Montague Chambers
- Constituency: Greenwich

Lord Mayor of the City of London
- In office November 10, 1855 – November 8, 1856
- Preceded by: Francis Moon
- Succeeded by: Thomas Finnis

Member of Parliament for Greenwich
- In office 1859–1873 Serving with W. Codrington, W. Angerstein, C. T. Bright, and W. E. Gladstone
- Preceded by: Sir William Codrington; John Townsend
- Succeeded by: William Ewart Gladstone; Thomas Boord

Personal details
- Born: 22 November 1797 London, Great Britain
- Died: 18 July 1873 (aged 75)
- Resting place: West Ham Jewish Cemetery
- Party: Radicals (1851–1859); Liberal (1859–1873)

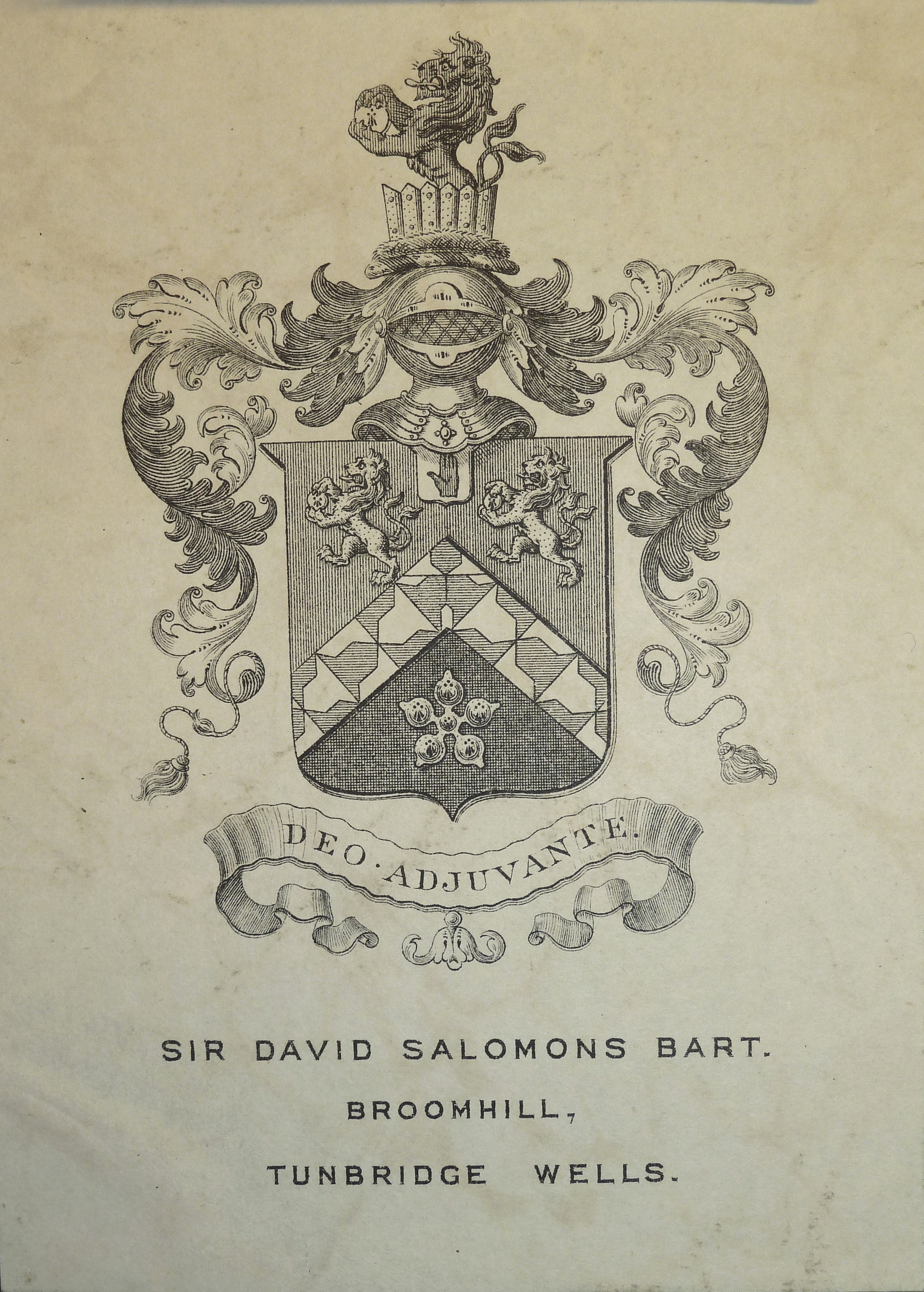
His bookplate

Sir David Salomons, 1st Baronet (22 November 1797 – 18 July 1873), was a leading figure in the 19th century struggle for Jewish emancipation in the United Kingdom. He was the first Jewish Sheriff of the City of London and Lord Mayor of London.

== Early life ==
Born in London, the son of Levy Salomons of St Mary Axe and Frant, Sussex, and Matilda de Metz of Leyden (married in 1795), he followed his father into business in the City of London, where he was a successful banker. Salomons was one of the founders of the London and Westminster Bank (now the NatWest), and a member of the London Stock Exchange.

In 1835 he was elected as sheriff of the City of London. However, he was unable to take up the post, because the mandatory oath of office included Christian statements of faith. The Sheriffs' Declaration Act was passed later that year, and Salomons was able to take up the post. In 1839, he was High Sheriff of Kent, where his Broomhill estate, now the Salomons Museum, was located near Tunbridge Wells.

In December 1835, Salomons was elected as an Alderman of the City of London, but again faced an unacceptable oath, and on this occasion the law was not changed. Salomons was disqualified, but was re-elected in 1847, after the Religious Opinions Relief Act had amended the oath. In 1855, the Aldermen elected him as Lord Mayor of London.

In the meantime, he trained as a lawyer and was called to the bar in 1849, though he did not practise as a barrister. However, he was the first Jewish magistrate in England. In 1847 he served on the committee of the British Relief Association.

== Parliament ==
In 1851, he stood as a Liberal candidate at a by-election in the Greenwich constituency, and on 28 June he was elected as one of the constituency's two Members of Parliament (MPs). He had previously been defeated in the 1847 general election.

He was not permitted to serve in the House of Commons, because he had not taken the oath of abjuration in the form established by Parliament. However, he did not withdraw quietly: instead he took the oath, but omitted the Christian phrases, and took his seat on the government benches.

He was asked to withdraw, and did so on the second request, but he returned three days later, on 21 July 1851. In the debate that followed, Salomons defended his presence on grounds of having been elected by a large majority, but was eventually removed by the Sergeant-at-Arms, and fined £500 for having voted illegally in three divisions of the House. He failed to win re-election in the 1852 general election.

When the law was eventually changed in 1858, Lionel de Rothschild became the first Jewish MP to legally take his seat, having been elected in 1857. In the 1859 general election, David Salomons was re-elected for Greenwich and served as the constituency's MP until his death in 1873.

His country house Broomhill north of Tunbridge Wells is now preserved as the Salomons Museum.

== Family ==
Salomons married in 1825 Jeanette, daughter of Solomon Cohen of Canonbury House and Hannah Samuel. Her aunts Judith and Henriette were the wives of Sir Moses Montefiore and Nathan Mayer Rothschild respectively. After her death in 1867 Salomons married Cecilia, the daughter of Samuel Moses Samuel in 1872. He was made a baronet of Broom Hill in the parish of Tonbridge in the County of Kent and of Great Cumberland Place in the County of Middlesex on 26 October 1869.

He died on 18 July 1873, and is buried in the Jewish Cemetery at West Ham. He had no children by either of his marriages, so his estate and titles passed to his nephew David Lionel Salomons, whom he had brought up after the death of Sir David's brother Philip Salomons.

== See also ==
- Emancipation of the Jews in England
- Lionel de Rothschild

Parliament of the United Kingdom
Preceded by Edward George Barnard; James Whitley Deans Dundas	Member of Parliament for Greenwich; 1851–1852; With: James Whitley Deans Dundas to Jan 1852; Houston Stewart from Feb 1852	Succeeded by Peter Rolt; Montague Chambers
Preceded by Sir William Codrington; John Townsend	Member of Parliament for Greenwich; 1859–1873; With: Sir William Codrington, to May 1859; William Angerstein, May 1859–1865; Sir Charles Tilston Bright, 1865–1868; William Ewart Gladstone, 1865–1873	Succeeded by William Ewart Gladstone; Thomas Boord
Civic offices
Preceded by Francis Moon	Lord Mayor of the City of London; 1855	Succeeded by Thomas Finnis
Baronetage of the United Kingdom
New creation	Baronet (of Broom Hill); 1869–1873	Succeeded by David Lionel Goldsmid-Stern-Salomons
