= George Rowland Hill =

English football official (1855-1928)

Sir George Rowland Hill
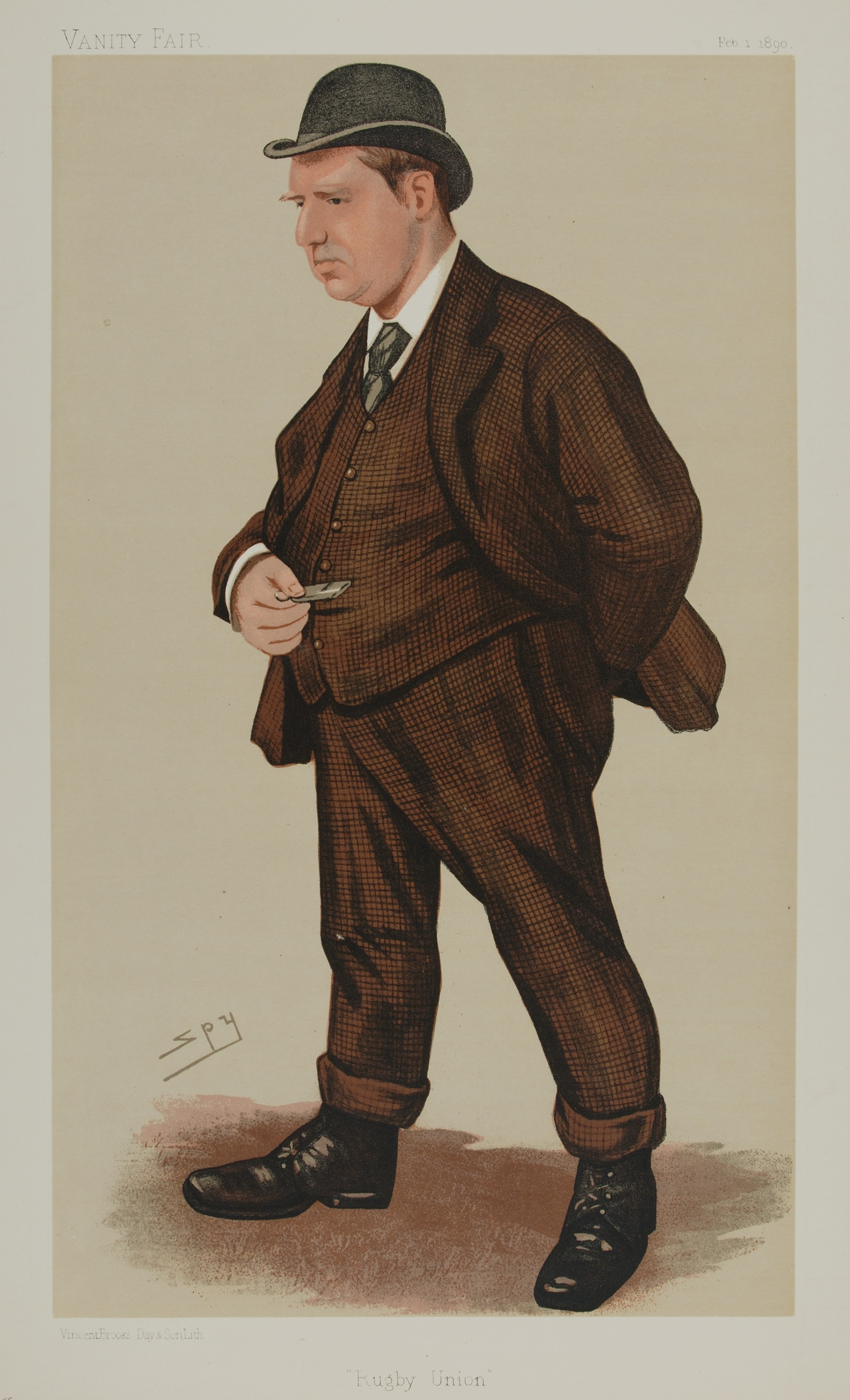
- Caricature of George Rowland Hill, Vanity Fair (1890)
- Born: 21 January 1855; Greenwich, England
- Died: 25 April 1928 (aged 73)

Sir George Rowland Hill (21 January 1855 – 25 April 1928) was an English sporting administrator, official and referee, who is most notable for his role as the Secretary and later President of the Rugby Football Union (RFU). Hill gave 49 years service to the RFU, and in 1927 became the first person to be knighted for services to the sport of rugby union.

== Sporting career ==
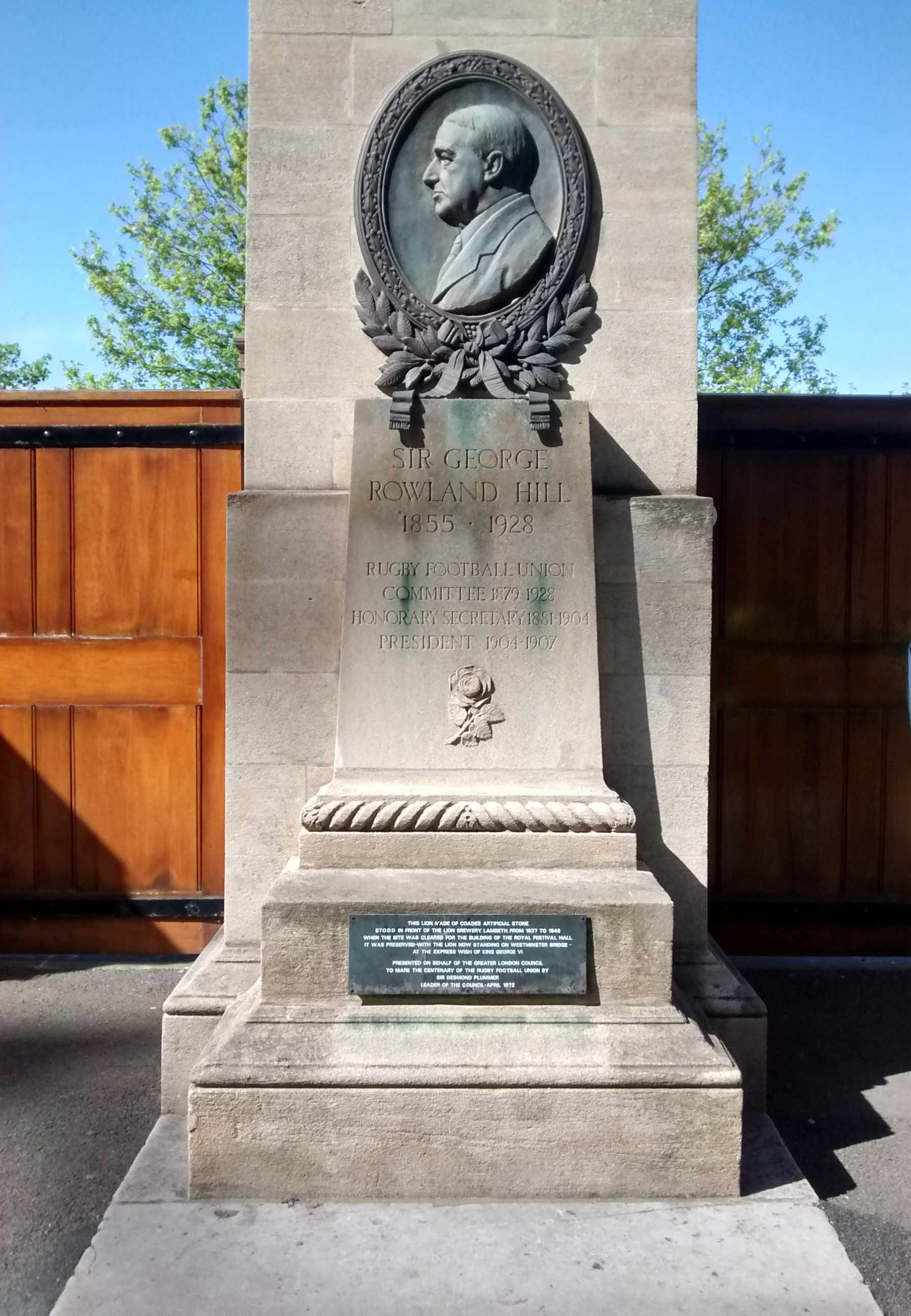
Memorial to Sir George Rowland Hill inside Twickenham Stadium

Hill first came to prominence when in 1881 he became one of the first secretaries of the Rugby Football Union, the official union to the game of rugby football in England. He held this post until 1904, a period which saw two of the most important events in the sport of rugby, and Hill was at the centre of both. The first of these events was the attempt by the Irish, Scottish and Welsh Rugby Unions in the 1880s to form an international union. The cause was a simple scoring dispute between England and Scotland during an international match. The Rugby Football Union, believing itself to be the voice of the game, refused to enter negotiations, and found itself frozen out of the international game when the other three unions formed the International Rugby Football Board.

The second event saw the greatest and most damaging change to the sport. Prior to 1893, rugby football was strictly amateur, and Hill was a strict advocate of the sport staying so at all costs. The RFU refused to allow the working men of the North of England to accept 'broken time' payments, roughly six shillings a week to cover a player's lost earnings for playing rugby. Even when the Northern clubs threatened to break away from the RFU, Hill and his union refused to capitulate, resulting in what is now known as the 'Great Schism' which resulted in the formation of rugby league, the professional form of rugby.

In 1898, Hill, along with RFU President Roger Walker and Cambridge Blue G R Joyce formed 'Berkshire Wanderers', the team that would become Reading RFC. In 1889 Hill officiated over an international rugby game between England and the New Zealand Natives.

== Personal life ==
Hill was educated at Christ's Hospital School between 1865 and 1870, becoming the school's rugby club president in 1919.

Outside sport, Hill was a keen public servant. For 37 years he held the post as the chairman of the Greenwich Conservative Association and from 1922 to 1925 he served on the London County Council as a representative of Greenwich.

Hill was knighted in the 1926 Birthday Honours.

Hill died on 25 April 1928. His funeral service was held at Greenwich Parish Church, and was attended by over 500 people.
