= John Townsend (MP for Greenwich) =

British actor and Liberal Party politician

John Townsend (2 April 1819 – 22 December 1892) was a British actor and Liberal Party politician.

Born in Deptford, in the south eastern suburbs of London, Townsend was the son of an auctioneer and estate agent in the neighbouring town of Greenwich. He began acting at the age of 12. In 1841 he married Sarah Mitchell, also an actor, and they had at least seven children all of whom were trained for the stage. In 1842 he took out a lease on the Theatre Royal in Richmond, specialising in Shakespearian productions.

In 1852 his father died, and Townsend gave up acting to take over the family business. In 1857 he was approached by the Liberals to run in the general election of that year in opposition to one of the sitting members of parliament for Greenwich, Montague Chambers. Chambers had been elected as a Liberal in 1852, but had since left the party to run as an independent. Townsend was only approached two days before nominations for the election were made, but was very well known in the area, and easily defeated Chambers. Soon after the election it was alleged that Townsend was ineligible for election as he did not have an annual income of £300. In March 1858 he was adjudged bankrupt. He was suspended from the House of Commons, and came to an arrangement to pay off his debts within 12 months.

He returned to the stage in an attempt to pay off his creditors, playing leading roles in a number of London theatres where was billed as "John Townsend, MP". After a prolonged attempt to retain his seat, he resigned by becoming Steward of the Manor of Northstead in February 1859.

Townsend became the manager of the Theatre Royal, Leicester, and by 1862 had discharged his debts. He emigrated to Canada in May 1862, purchasing a farm outside Kingston, Ontario. He returned to acting in 1864, and in 1868 the family moved to Hamilton. They formed the "Townsend Family Star Dramatic Troupe" and toured Canada and the United States.

In 1877 Townsend became seriously ill in Indiana and had to leave the travelling company. He became a teacher of acting and elocution in Hamilton, where Julia Arthur was his most famous student. Townsend died in 1892 of liver cancer.

Parliament of the United Kingdom
Preceded by Montague Chambers; Sir William Codrington	Member of Parliament for Greenwich; 1857–1859; With: Sir William Codrington	Succeeded by David Salomons; Sir William Codrington
