= William Codrington (British Army officer) =

British Army officer and politician (1804–1884)

General Sir William Codrington GCB
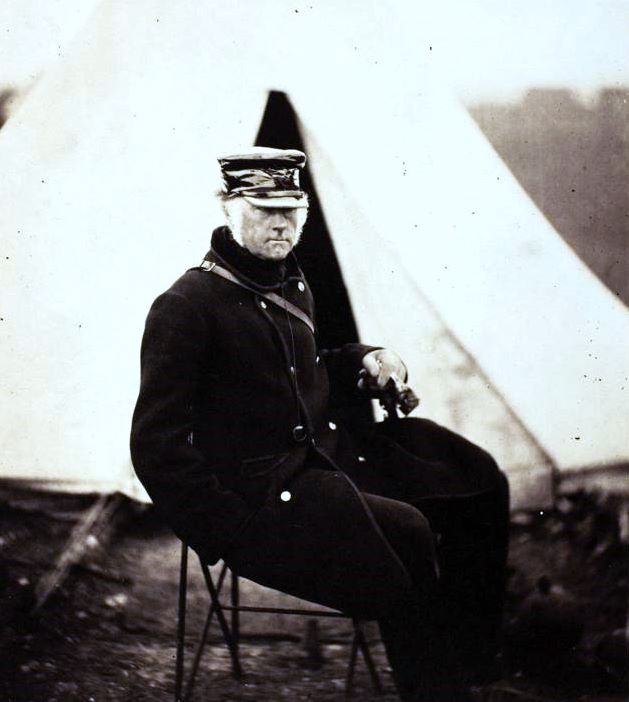
- Codrington in 1855
- Born: 26 November 1804
- Died: 6 August 1884 (aged 79); Heckfield, Hampshire
- Burial place: Woking, Surrey
- Relatives: Admiral Sir Edward Codrington (father); Lieutenant General Sir Alfred Codrington (son)
- Military career
- Allegiance: United Kingdom/British Empire
- Branch: British Army
- Service years: 1821–1855
- Rank: General
- Conflicts: Crimean War; Battle of the Alma; Battle of Inkerman; Siege of Sebastopol
- Awards: Knight Grand Cross of the Order of the Bath; Commander of the Legion of Honour (France); Knight Grand Cross of the Military Order of Savoy (Sardinia); Order of the Medjidie, 1st Class (Ottoman Empire)

General Sir William John Codrington, GCB (26 November 1804 – 6 August 1884) was a British Army officer and politician who served in the Crimean War.

== Military career ==
He was the second son of Admiral Sir Edward Codrington, the victor of the Battle of Navarino. He was born on 26 November 1804. He entered the army as an ensign in the Coldstream Guards in 1821, and was promoted lieutenant in 1823, lieutenant and captain in 1826, major and lieutenant colonel in 1836, and colonel in 1846, and throughout that period had never been on active service.

He found himself at Varna in the summer of 1854, when the English and French armies were encamped there, either as a mere visitor and colonel unattached, as Kinglake says, or in command of the battalion of Coldstream guards, when his promotion to the rank of major general was gazetted on 20 June 1854. As a general officer on the spot, he was requested by Lord Raglan to take command of the 1st Brigade of the Light Division, consisting of the 7th, 23rd, and 33rd regiments, which had become vacant owing to the promotion of Brigadier General Richard Airey to be quartermaster-general in the place of Lord de Ros.

As a general commanding a brigade and absolutely without experience of war, Codrington went into action in his first battle, the Battle of Alma. The light division got too far ahead and fell into confusion in crossing the Alma, and Codrington, seeing that his men could not lie still and be slaughtered by the Russian guns, boldly charged the great redoubt and carried it. But he had soon to fall back before the weight of the Russian column, and ran a risk of being utterly crushed, until the Russian column was broken by the charge of the highland brigade under Sir Colin Campbell. His bravery in this battle showed that Codrington deserved his command, and he again proved his courage at the battle of Inkerman, where he occupied the Victoria Ridge throughout the day, and perpetually sent off all the troops who came up to his help to assist in the real battle on the Inkerman tusk. Sir George Brown, who commanded the light division, was severely wounded in this battle, and after it Codrington assumed the command of the whole division as senior brigadier.

Throughout the winter of 1854–55 he remained in command of the division, and on 5 July 1855 he received the reward of his constancy by being made a Knight Commander of the Order of the Bath. Codrington arranged with General Edwin Markham, commanding the 2nd Division, the attack on the Redan of 8 September, but blame seems to have been showered more freely on Sir James Simpson, who commanded in chief since Lord Raglan's death, than on the actual contrivers of that fatal attack. On 11 November 1855, for some reason that has never been properly explained, Codrington succeeded Sir James Simpson as Commander-in-Chief instead of Sir Colin Campbell, who had much better claims to the succession, and he commanded the force occupying Sebastopol, for there was no more fighting, until the final evacuation of the Crimea on 12 July 1856.

On his return to England, Codrington was promoted lieutenant general, appointed colonel of the 54th Foot, and in 1857 was elected MP for Greenwich, in the liberal interest. From 1859 to 1865, he was Governor of Gibraltar. He was made a Knight Grand Cross of the Order of the Bath in the latter year, and was promoted general in 1863. In 1860, he was transferred to the colonelcy of the 23rd Foot, and in 1875 to that of the Coldstream guards, the regiment in which he had risen.

He remained an active politician to the end of his life, and contested Westminster in 1874, and Lewes in 1880, in the liberal interest. He saw no active service except in 1854 and 1855. He wore a medal and four clasps for the Crimea, and was a Commander of the Legion of Honour, a Knight Grand Cross of the Military Order of Savoy, and a member of the first class of Order of the Medjidie.

Codrington died on 6 August 1884, in his eightieth year, at Danmore Cottage, Heckfield, Winchfield in Hampshire.

== Political career ==
In politics, Codrington was a Liberal supporter of Viscount Palmerston. He particularly liked his leader's foreign policy. He was in favour of "progressive reform" and "civil and religious liberty", but did not support the secret ballot.

He was Member of Parliament for Greenwich between a by-election in February 1857 and 1859. He contested Westminster in 1874 and Lewes in 1880.

In 1868 he stood for the seat of Greenwich, replacing fellow Liberal Sir William Bright who had declined to stand. When William Gladstone failed to take the seat of Lancashire, Codrington himself stood aside to allow him to represent Greenwich.

== Family ==
In 1836 he married Mary Ames and together they went on to have two sons and two daughters. His son, Alfred, also joined the Army, commanding a Home Service army during the First World War; his elder daughter Jane Emily married Robert, later Sir Robert Uniacke-Penrose-Fitzgerald; his younger daughter Mary married William Earle, an Army officer killed commanding the British forces at the Battle of Kirbekan. The other son died young.

== Sources ==
- Who's Who of British members of parliament: Volume I 1832–1885, edited by M. Stenton (The Harvester Press 1976)
- Sweetman, John (January 2011) [2004]. "Codrington, Sir William John (1804–1884)". Oxford Dictionary of National Biography. Oxford Dictionary of National Biography (online ed.). Oxford University Press. doi:10.1093/ref:odnb/5800. (Subscription, Wikipedia Library access or UK public library membership required.)

Parliament of the United Kingdom
Preceded by Peter Rolt; Montague Chambers	Member of Parliament for Greenwich; Feb. 1857 – May 1859; With: Montague Chambers, to Mar 1857; John Townsend, Mar 1857 – Feb 1859; David Salomons, Feb–May 1859	Succeeded by David Salomons; William Angerstein
Government offices
Preceded by James Fergusson	Governor of Gibraltar; 1859–1865	Succeeded by The Lord Airey
Military offices
Preceded by Sir William Gomm	Colonel of the Coldstream Guards; 1875–1884	Succeeded by Sir Thomas Steele
