= Arthur Fanshawe =

Royal Navy Admiral (1794–1864)

Admiral Sir Arthur Fanshawe KCB
- Born: 5 February 1794; Regent's Park, London, England
- Died: 14 June 1864 (aged 70); Regent's Park, London, England
- Military career
- Allegiance: United Kingdom
- Branch: Royal Navy
- Rank: Admiral
- Commands: HMS Donegal; HMS Princess Charlotte; West Africa Squadron; North American Station; Mediterranean Station; Plymouth Command
- Conflicts: Oriental Crisis
- Awards: Knight Grand Cross of the Order of the Bath

Admiral Sir Arthur Fanshawe KCB (5 February 1794 – 14 June 1864) was a Royal Navy officer who went on to be Commander-in-Chief, Plymouth.

== Naval career ==
Born the son of Robert Fanshawe, Fanshawe joined the Royal Navy in 1804. Promoted to captain in 1816, he commanded HMS Donegal from 1832 and then HMS Princess Charlotte during the Oriental Crisis in 1840.

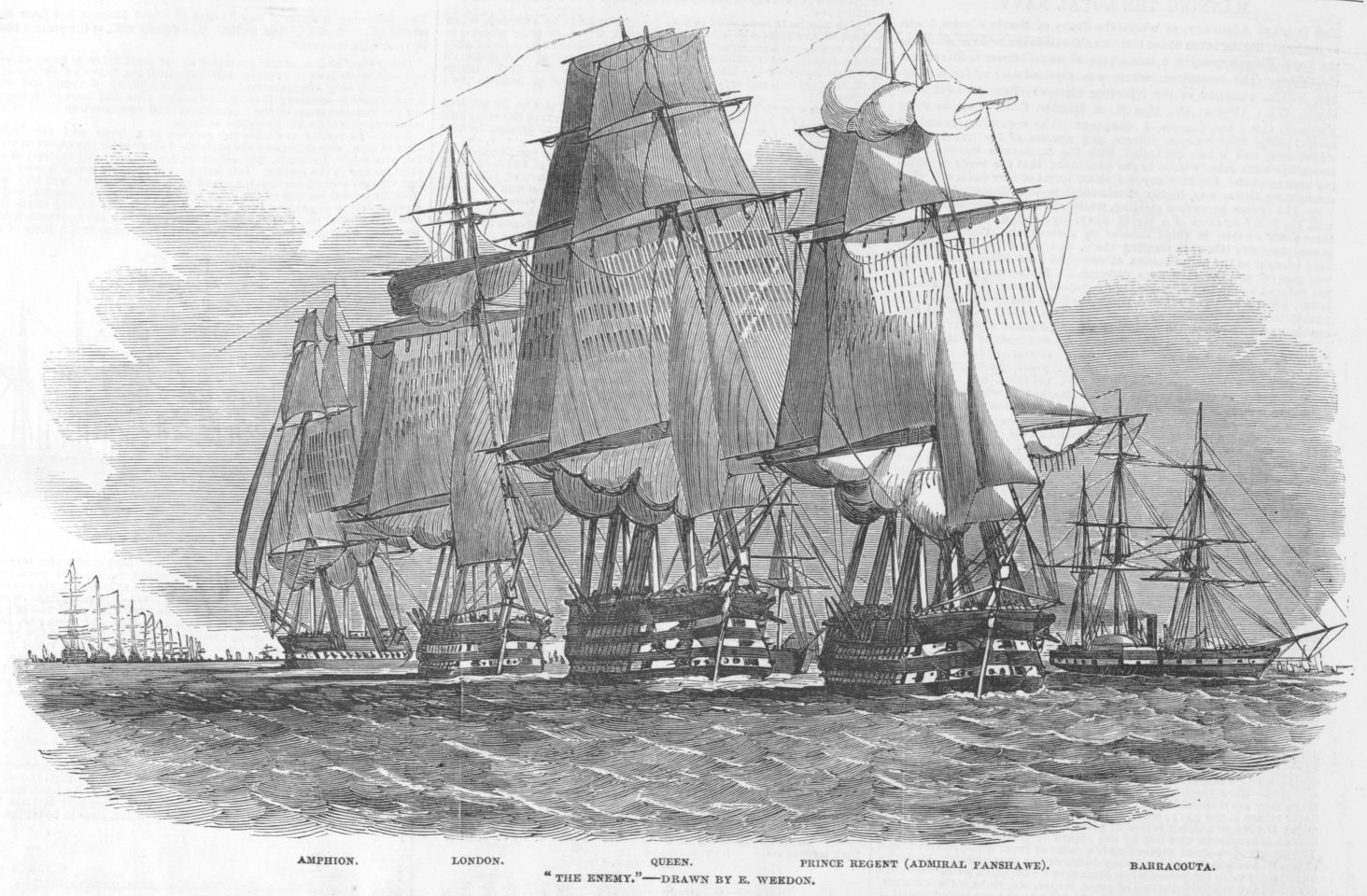
The Naval Review of 1853, HMS Prince Regent (Admiral Fanshawe) in the lead, Illustrated London News

Fanshawe was appointed Commodore, West Coast of Africa in 1849, Commander-in-chief, North America and West Indies in 1853 and Commander-in-Chief, Mediterranean Fleet in 1858. His last appointment was as Commander-in-Chief, Plymouth from June 1860.

Fanshawe died at Regent's Park in London and left his estates in Hampshire to his nephew, Admiral Sir Edward Fanshawe.

== See also ==
- O'Byrne, William Richard (1849). "Fanshawe, Arthur" . A Naval Biographical Dictionary . John Murray – via Wikisource.

Military offices
Preceded by Sir George Seymour	Commander-in-Chief, North America and West Indies Station; 1853–1856	Succeeded by Sir Houston Stewart
Preceded by Sir Edmund Lyons	Commander-in-Chief, Mediterranean Fleet; 1858–1860	Succeeded by Sir William Martin
Preceded by Sir Barrington Reynolds	Commander-in-Chief, Plymouth; June 1860–October 1860	Succeeded by Sir Houston Stewart
