= Montague Chambers =

British politician (1799–1885)

Montague Chambers QC

Member of Parliament for Greenwich
- In office 1852–1857

Member of Parliament for Devonport
- In office 1866–1874

Personal details
- Born: November 1799
- Died: 18 September 1885 (aged 85) Fulham, London
- Party: Liberal
- Education: Royal Military College, Sandhurst
- Profession: Barrister

Military service
- Allegiance: United Kingdom
- Branch/service: British Army
- Unit: Grenadier Guards

Montague Chambers QC (November 1799 – 18 September 1885) was an English lawyer and Liberal Party politician who sat House of Commons in two periods between 1852 and 1874.

Chambers was the son of George Chambers, son of the architect Sir William Chambers and his wife Jane Rodney, daughter of Admiral the 1st Baron Rodney. He was educated at the Royal Military College, Sandhurst, and served in the Grenadier Guards.

In February 1828, he was called to the bar at Lincoln's Inn. He became editor of "The Law Journal" in 1835. He went on the Home circuit and in 1845 was appointed a Queen's Counsel. He was a bencher of his inn and a member of the Royal Institution.

Chambers stood unsuccessfully for parliament at Greenwich at a by-election in February 1852, but was elected as a member of parliament (MP) for Greenwich at the general election in July 1852. He was defeated at the 1857 general election. In 1865 he stood unsuccessfully for parliament at Bedford. He was elected an MP for Devonport at a by-election on 22 May 1866, and held the seat until he stood down from the Commons at the 1874 general election.

Chambers died in the Fulham district at the age of 85.

Parliament of the United Kingdom
Preceded by David Salomons; Houston Stewart	Member of Parliament for Greenwich; 1852–1857; With: Peter Rolt until February 1857; Sir William Codrington from February 1857	Succeeded by John Townsend; Sir William Codrington
Preceded by William Ferrand; John Fleming	Member of Parliament for Devonport; 1866–1874; With: Lord Eliot 1866–1868; John Delaware Lewis 1868–1874	Succeeded by John Henry Puleston; George Edward Price
