= Edward Timothy Palmer =

British Labour Party politician

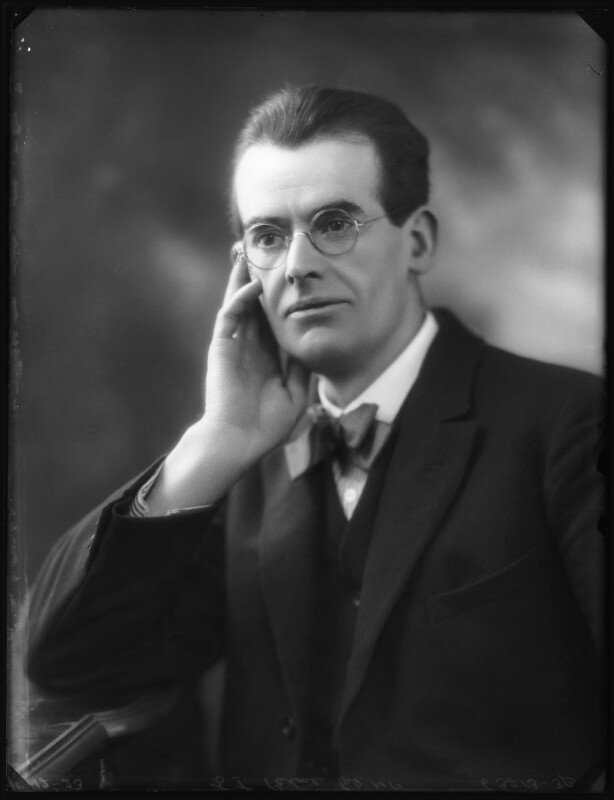
Palmer in 1923

Edward Timothy Palmer (1878 –22 April 1947) was a British Labour Party politician.

== Life ==
Born in Croydon, Palmer worked in the insurance industry, and became a leading trade unionist in that sector. He held the office of president of the National Federation of Insurance Workers and general secretary of the Prudential Staff Union. He first contested a parliamentary seat at the 1918 general election, standing without success at Canterbury.

At the next general election in 1922 Palmer stood as Labour candidate at Greenwich. He failed to be elected, with his only opponent, George Hopwood Hume, holding the seat for the Conservative Party by a majority of more than 6,000 votes. A year later another general election was called. Palmer stood against Hume at Greenwich once more. However, on this occasion, it was a three-cornered contest, with the Liberal Party also having a candidate. The Liberals, although in third place, took nearly 6,000 votes from the Conservatives and Palmer was elected with a majority of 1,586 votes.

The Labour Party had made a large number of gains, leading to the formation of the First Labour Government. This minority administration lasted only ten months, however. Following the loss of a vote of confidence in the House of Commons, a general election was held in October 1924. In spite of an increase in his vote, Palmer was unseated in a straight fight with the former member, George Hopwood Hume, regaining the seat for the Conservatives by a little over a thousand votes. Greenwich was one of forty seats lost by Labour, which became the main opposition party in the new parliament.

The 1924 parliament ran a five-year term, with the next general election held in May 1929. The Labour Party saw a modest increase in its vote and gained a large number of seats, and the Liberal Party also took votes and seats from the Conservatives. In Greenwich Palmer regained the seat from Hume in a three-cornered contest with a majority of 3,618 votes. Labour again formed a minority government. In August 1931 the formation of a National Government led to a split in the Labour Party. When an election was called in October 1931 the supporters of the National Government won a huge majority, with Labour losing most of its seats. Hume regained the seat for the Conservatives by a large majority of more than 15,000 votes. Palmer's vote was also affected by the presence of a Communist candidate who secured over 2,000 votes.

Palmer did not contest another parliamentary election, and retired from his union activities in 1934. In 1946 he was living at South Benfleet, Essex, and was elected to Essex County Council.

Parliament of the United Kingdom
Preceded by George Hopwood Hume	Member of Parliament for Greenwich; 1923 – 1924	Succeeded by George Hopwood Hume
Preceded by Sir George Hopwood Hume	Member of Parliament for Greenwich; 1929 – 1931	Succeeded by Sir George Hopwood Hume
Trade union offices
Preceded by H. Birnage	General Secretary of the Prudential Staff Union; 1914–1929	Succeeded by William Thomas Brown
