= George Hume (politician) =

British Conservative politician

Sir George Hopwood Hume

Member of Parliament for Greenwich
- In office 27 October 1931 – 15 June 1945
- Preceded by: Edward Timothy Palmer
- Succeeded by: Joseph Reeves
- In office 29 October 1924 – 10 May 1929
- Preceded by: Edward Timothy Palmer
- Succeeded by: Edward Timothy Palmer
- In office 15 November 1922 – 16 November 1923
- Preceded by: Ion Hamilton Benn
- Succeeded by: Edward Timothy Palmer

Personal details
- Born: 24 May 1866 Poltava
- Died: 13 September 1946 (aged 80) Blackheath, London
- Party: Conservative

Sir George Hopwood Hume (24 May 1866 – 13 September 1946) was a British Conservative politician and leader of the London County Council.

He was born in the Ukrainian city of Poltava, then in the Russian Empire. His father was George Hume, a Scottish mechanical engineer, and British vice consul at Kiev and Kharkov. He was educated in Russia, Switzerland and at the Finsbury Technical College, London. He was apprenticed as an electrical engineer at Siemens Brothers, later studying law and was called to the bar at the Middle Temple in 1900. In 1901, he married Jeanne Alice Ladrierre of Lausanne, who died in 1922.

== Political career ==
=== Greenwich Borough Council ===
Hume entered politics in November 1900 when he was elected to the newly constituted Greenwich Borough Council as a member of the Conservative-backed Moderate grouping. He topped the poll in the Charlton ward, and became leader as the Moderates took control of the new council.

=== London County Council ===
In March 1910 Hume was elected to the London County Council to represent Greenwich. He was a member of the majority Municipal Reform Party, the title used by the Conservatives, on the county council. He was re-elected in 1913, and was appointed chairman of the Highways Committee. In this capacity in May 1914 he presided over a ceremony to commission new turbines at the Greenwich Power Station of the London County Council Tramways.

==== Leader of the council ====
In 1918 Hume succeeded Ronald Collet Norman as leader of the Municipal Reformers and thus the council. Although the party had a majority of seats, they had formed a wartime coalition with the opposition Progressives. Hume, who was re-elected in 1919, continued this agreement until 1922. Hume was elevated to the rank of county alderman in 1922 which he was to hold until his death. In 1924 he was knighted. In 1925 he resigned as council leader, and in 1926 was elected to the ceremonial post of Chairman of the L.C.C.

=== Member of Parliament for Greenwich ===
In 1922, Hume was nominated as Conservative candidate for the parliamentary constituency of Greenwich. He was elected by a large majority over his Labour Party opponent, Edward Palmer. A further election was held in 1923, and Palmer unseated Hume. Hume unseated Palmer at the 1924 election, only for the situation to be reversed in 1929. In 1931, Hume regained the seat, with Palmer's vote reduced by the presence of a Communist candidate, and was re-elected four years later.

Apart from his municipal and parliamentary offices, Hume was a member of the London and Home Counties Traffic Advisory Committee, the Thames Conservancy Board and the London and Home Counties Joint Electricity Authority.

In 1932, he married Dorothy Hunt Blundell. In 1938, he indicated his intention to stand down at the next election. In the event, elections were postponed due to the Second World War, and he remained in the Commons until 1945.

== Death ==
Sir George Hume died at his home at Blackheath, London in September 1946, aged 80.

Parliament of the United Kingdom
Preceded by Sir Ion Benn, Bt	Member of Parliament for Greenwich; 1922 – 1923	Succeeded by Edward Timothy Palmer
Preceded by Edward Timothy Palmer	Member of Parliament for Greenwich; 1924 – 1929	Succeeded by Edward Timothy Palmer
Preceded by Edward Timothy Palmer	Member of Parliament for Greenwich; 1931 – 1945	Succeeded by Joseph Reeves
Political offices
Preceded by Oscar Emanuel Warburg	Chairman of the London County Council; 1926 – 1927	Succeeded by John Maria Gatti
