= Greenwich (UK Parliament constituency) =

Parliamentary constituency in the United Kingdom, 1885–1997

- Former borough constituency for the House of Commons
- Form 1832-1885. Extract from 1837 result: the easterly area striped.
- County: Greater London

1832–1885
- Seats: Two
- Created from: Kent, Surrey
- Replaced by: Greenwich (see below); Woolwich; Deptford

1885–1997
- Seats: One
- Created from: Greenwich and small corner of West Kent
- Replaced by: Greenwich and Woolwich

Greenwich was a constituency in south-east London, which returned at first two, then (from 1885) one member (MP) to the House of Commons of the UK Parliament. It existed from 1832 to 1997. Elections used the first past the post system; when this elects more than one member, it is sometimes called plurality-at-large voting.

== History ==
From 1832 until 1885 it was a two-member constituency. Under the Redistribution of Seats Act 1885 associated with the Reform Act 1884, its area was reduced overall (although it gained Kidbrooke) and it was reduced to one seat. For the 1997 general election, it was merged with part of the former Woolwich constituency to form the Greenwich and Woolwich seat.

Its history is dominated by the area's strong maritime tradition. Its most prominent claim to fame was as the seat of William Ewart Gladstone between 1868 and 1880, and it also achieved prominence in the 1987 Greenwich by-election, when the SDP won a surprise victory.

== Boundaries ==
1832–1885: the parishes of Greenwich; Deptford St Nicholas and Deptford St Paul; and the most populous parts of Charlton and Woolwich. detailed as: "From the Point at which the Royal Arsenal Canal at Woolwich joins the Thames, along the said Canal to the southern extremity thereof; thence in a straight Line to the south-western corner of the Ordnance Storekeeper's House; thence in a straight Line, in the Direction of a Stile in the footpath from Woolwich to Plumstead Common, over Sand Hill, to the Boundary of the Parish of Woolwich; thence, southward, along the boundary of the parish of Woolwich to the point at which the same meets the Boundary of the parish of Charlton; thence westward along the Boundary of the parish of Charlton to the point at which the same turns southward near the Dovor Road; thence along the Dovor Road to the nearest point of the boundary of the parish of Greenwich; thence Westward, along the boundary of the parish of Greenwich to the point at which the same turns abruptly to the south, close by the Dovor Road, thence in a straight line, in a westerly direction, to the nearest point of the boundary of the parish of Greenwich, thence westward along the boundary of the parish of Greenwich to the point at which the same meets the boundary of the parish of Saint Paul Deptford; thence southward along the boundary of the parish of Saint Paul Deptford to the point at which the same meets the Thames; thence along the Thames to the point first described." The boundaries were thus in the schedules of the Parliamentary Boundaries Act 1832.

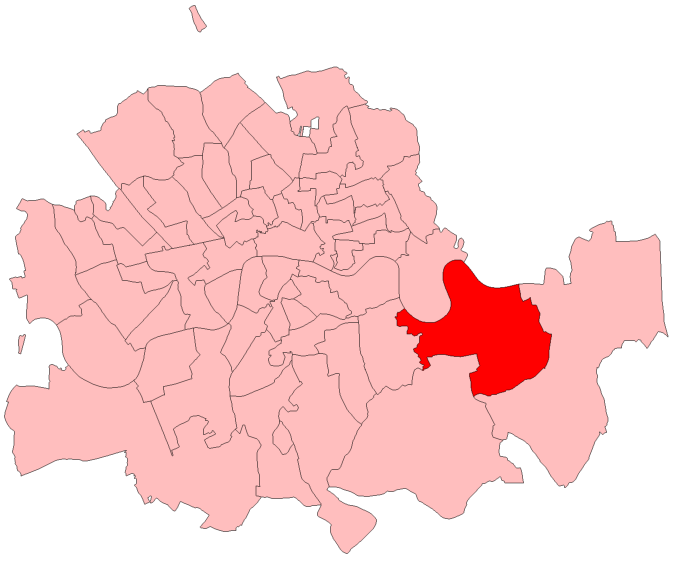
The seat and others of the Metropolitan Board of Works area, 1885–1918

1885–1918: The parishes of Greenwich, St Nicholas Deptford, Charlton, and Kidbrooke.

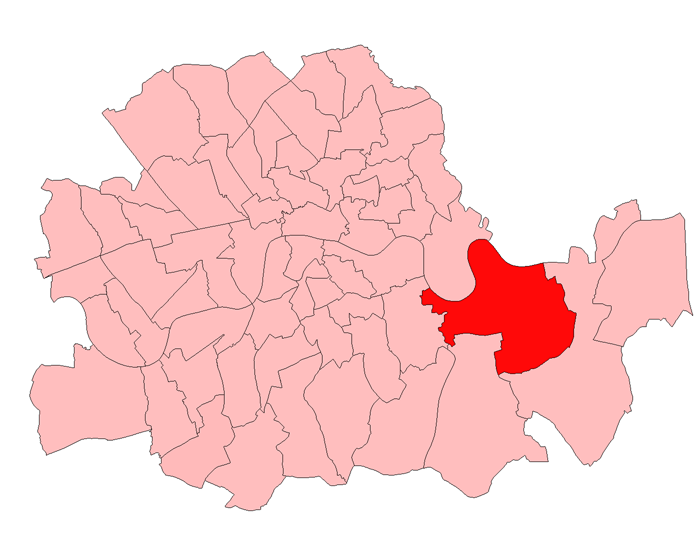
The seat and others in the County of London 1918–50

wards of Greenwich Metropolitan Borough in 1916

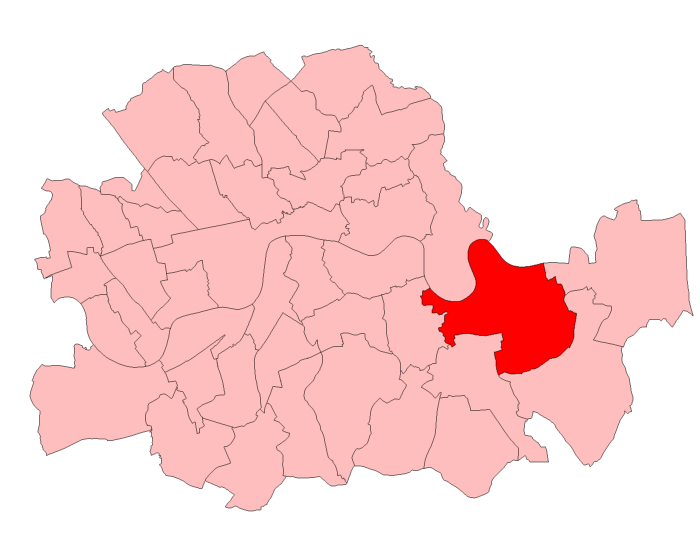
The seat and others in the County of London 1950–74

1918–1974: The Metropolitan Borough of Greenwich.

1974–1983: The London Borough of Greenwich wards of Blackheath, Charlton, Eastcombe, Hornfair, Kidbrooke, Marsh, Park, Trafalgar, Vanbrugh, and West.

The seat and others in Greater London 1983–97

1983–1997: The London Borough of Greenwich wards of Blackheath, Charlton, Ferrier, Hornfair, Kidbrooke, Rectory Field, St Alfege, Trafalgar, Vanbrugh, and West.

Between 1983 and 1997, the constituency formed the western part of the Royal Borough of Greenwich.

== Members of Parliament ==
=== MPs 1832–1885 ===
Election	First member	First party	Second member	Second party
1832	James Whitley Deans Dundas	Whig	Edward George Barnard	Radical
1835	John Angerstein	Whig	Edward George Barnard	Radical
1837	Matthias Wolverley Attwood	Conservative	Edward George Barnard	Radical
1841	James Whitley Deans Dundas	Whig	Edward George Barnard	Radical
1851 by-election	James Whitley Deans Dundas	Whig	David Salomons	Radical
1852 by-election	Houston Stewart	Whig	David Salomons	Radical
1852	Peter Rolt	Conservative	Montague Chambers	Radical
Feb 1857 by-election	Sir William Codrington	Whig	Montague Chambers	Radical
Mar. 1857	Sir William Codrington	Whig	John Townsend	Radical
Feb. 1859 by-election	Sir William Codrington	Whig	David Salomons	Radical
1859	William Angerstein	Liberal	David Salomons	Liberal
1865	Sir Charles Tilston Bright	Liberal	David Salomons	Liberal
1868	William Ewart Gladstone	Liberal	David Salomons	Liberal
1873 by-election	William Ewart Gladstone	Liberal	Sir Thomas Boord	Conservative
1880	Baron Henry de Worms	Conservative	Sir Thomas Boord	Conservative
1885	Representation reduced to one member			

=== MPs since 1885 ===
Election	Member	Party
1885	Sir Thomas Boord	Conservative
1895	Lord Hugh Cecil	Conservative
1906	Richard Jackson	Liberal
Jan 1910	Ion Hamilton Benn	Conservative
1922	George Hume	Conservative
1923	Edward Timothy Palmer	Labour
1924	Sir George Hume	Conservative
1929	Edward Timothy Palmer	Labour
1931	Sir George Hume	Conservative
1945	Joseph Reeves	Labour
1959	Richard Marsh	Labour
1971 by-election	Guy Barnett	Labour
1987 by-election	Rosie Barnes	SDP
1988	Rosie Barnes	'Continuing' SDP
1990	Rosie Barnes	Independent Social Democrat
1992	Nick Raynsford	Labour
1997	constituency abolished	

== Election results ==
=== Elections in the 1830s ===
1832 general election: Greenwich
Party	Candidate	Votes	%	±%
Whig	James Whitley Deans Dundas	1,633	39.6	
Radical	Edward George Barnard	1,442	35.0	
Whig	John Angerstein	1,033	25.1	
Radical	Frederick George Hammond	15	0.4	
Turnout		2,391	88.1	
Registered electors		2,714		
Majority		191	4.6	
Whig win (new seat)				
Majority		409	9.9	
Radical win (new seat)				

1835 general election: Greenwich
Party	Candidate	Votes	%	±%
Whig	John Angerstein	1,826	45.8	−18.8
Radical	Edward George Barnard	1,102	27.6	−7.8
Conservative	Matthias Wolverley Attwood	1,063	26.6	New
Turnout		2,210	87.8	−0.3
Registered electors		2,516		
Majority		724	18.2	+13.6
Whig hold		Swing	−7.5	
Majority		39	1.0	−8.9
Radical hold		Swing	+7.5	

1837 general election: Greenwich
Party	Candidate	Votes	%	±%
Conservative	Matthias Wolverley Attwood	1,368	36.8	+10.2
Radical	Edward George Barnard	1,194	32.1	+4.5
Radical	Charles Napier	1,158	31.1	N/A
Turnout		2,434	78.3	−9.5
Registered electors		3,107		
Majority		210	5.7	N/A
Conservative gain from Whig		Swing	+2.9	
Majority		36	1.0	±0.0
Radical hold		Swing	−2.9	

=== Elections in the 1840s ===
1841 general election: Greenwich
Party	Candidate	Votes	%	±%
Whig	James Whitley Deans Dundas	1,747	37.9	N/A
Radical	Edward George Barnard	1,592	34.5	+2.4
Conservative	George Cockburn	1,274	27.6	−9.2
Turnout		2,848	74.7	−3.6
Registered electors		3,811		
Majority		473	10.3	
Whig gain from Conservative		Swing		
Majority		318	6.9	+5.9
Radical hold		Swing	+3.5	

Dundas was appointed a Lord Commissioner of the Admiralty, requiring a by-election.

By-election, 13 July 1846: Greenwich
Party	Candidate	Votes	%	±%
Whig	James Whitley Deans Dundas	Unopposed		
Whig hold				

1847 general election: Greenwich
Party	Candidate	Votes	%	±%
Whig	James Whitley Deans Dundas	2,409	46.7	+8.8
Radical	Edward George Barnard	1,511	29.3	−5.2
Radical	David Salomons	1,236	24.0	N/A
Turnout		2,578 (est)	49.7 (est)	−25.0
Registered electors		5,187		
Majority		1,173	22.7	+15.8
Whig hold		Swing	+7.0	
Radical hold		Swing	−7.0	

=== Elections in the 1850s ===
Barnard's death caused a by-election.

By-election, 28 June 1851: Greenwich
Party	Candidate	Votes	%	±%
Radical	David Salomons	2,165	62.9	+38.9
Radical	David Williams Wire	1,278	37.1	N/A
Majority		887	25.8	N/A
Turnout		3,443	57.2	+7.5
Registered electors		6,022		
Radical hold		Swing	N/A	

Dundas resigned after being appointed Commander of the Mediterranean Fleet, causing a by-election.

By-election, 11 February 1852: Greenwich
Party	Candidate	Votes	%	±%
Whig	Houston Stewart	2,956	70.9	+24.2
Radical	Montague Chambers	1,211	29.1	−24.2
Majority		1,745	41.8	+19.1
Turnout		4,167	66.1	+16.4
Registered electors		6,308		
Whig hold		Swing	+24.2	

1852 general election: Greenwich
Party	Candidate	Votes	%	±%
Conservative	Peter Rolt	2,415	30.6	New
Radical	Montague Chambers	2,360	29.9	+0.6
Whig	Houston Stewart	2,026	25.6	−41.1
Radical	David Salomons	1,102	13.9	−10.1
Turnout		5,159 (est)	81.8 (est)	+32.1
Registered electors		6,308		
Majority		389	5.0	N/A
Conservative gain from Whig		Swing	N/A	
Majority		334	4.3	N/A
Radical hold		Swing	+10.6	

Rolt resigned, causing a by-election.

By-election, 9 February 1857: Greenwich
Party	Candidate	Votes	%	±%
Whig	William Codrington	2,975	65.8	+30.2
Radical	Arthur B. Sleigh	1,543	34.2	−9.6
Majority		1,432	31.6	N/A
Turnout		4,518	57.3	−24.5
Registered electors		7,888		
Whig gain from Conservative		Swing	+19.9	

1857 general election: Greenwich
Party	Candidate	Votes	%	±%
Whig	William Codrington	2,985	38.1	+12.5
Radical	John Townsend	2,784	35.5	+21.6
Radical	Montague Chambers	2,065	26.4	−3.5
Majority		719	9.1	N/A
Turnout		3,917 (est)	49.7 (est)	−32.1
Registered electors		7,888		
Whig gain from Conservative		Swing	+1.8	
Radical hold		Swing	+4.6	

Townsend resigned after becoming a bankrupt, also leading to his suspension from the House of Commons.

By-election, 16 February 1859: Greenwich
Party	Candidate	Votes	%	±%
Radical	David Salomons	3,444	57.7	−4.2
Whig	William Angerstein	2,523	42.3	+4.2
Majority		921	15.4	N/A
Turnout		5,967	75.1	+25.4
Registered electors		7,942		
Radical hold		Swing	−4.2	

1859 general election: Greenwich
Party	Candidate	Votes	%	±%
Liberal	David Salomons	3,873	38.2	N/A
Liberal	William Angerstein	3,520	34.7	N/A
Liberal	Montague Chambers	1,718	16.9	−9.5
Conservative	John Heron-Maxwell	1,031	10.2	New
Majority		1,802	17.8	+8.7
Turnout		5,587 (est)	70.3 (est)	+20.6
Registered electors		7,942		
Liberal hold		Swing		
Liberal hold		Swing		

=== Elections in the 1860s ===
1865 general election: Greenwich
Party	Candidate	Votes	%	±%
Liberal	David Salomons	4,499	41.6	+3.4
Liberal	Charles Tilston Bright	3,691	34.1	N/A
Conservative	John Heron-Maxwell	2,328	21.5	+16.4
Radical Liberal	Baxter Langley	190	1.8	New
Conservative	Douglas Harris	116	1.1	−4.0
Majority		1,363	12.6	−5.2
Turnout		6,518 (est)	66.5 (est)	−3.8
Registered electors		9,805		
Liberal hold		Swing	−1.4	
Liberal hold		Swing	N/A	

1868 general election: Greenwich
Party	Candidate	Votes	%	±%
Liberal	David Salomons	6,684	30.2	−11.4
Liberal	William Ewart Gladstone	6,386	28.8	−5.3
Conservative	Henry Parker	4,704	21.2	−0.3
Conservative	Arthur Stanhope	4,372	19.7	+18.6
Majority		1,682	7.6	−5.0
Turnout		11,073 (est)	71.0 (est)	+4.5
Registered electors		15,588		
Liberal hold		Swing	−15.0	
Liberal hold		Swing	−2.5	

Gladstone's appointment as Prime Minister and First Lord of the Treasury caused a by-election.

By-election, 21 December 1868: Greenwich
Party	Candidate	Votes	%	±%
Liberal	William Ewart Gladstone	Unopposed		
Liberal hold				

=== Elections in the 1870s ===
Salomons' death caused a by-election.

By-election, 4 Aug 1873: Greenwich
Party	Candidate	Votes	%	±%
Conservative	Thomas Boord	4,525	54.2	+13.3
Radical Liberal	Baxter Langley	2,379	28.5	New
Liberal	William Angerstein	1,064	12.7	−46.3
Radical Liberal	John Bennett	324	3.9	New
Liberal-Conservative	Robert Coningsby	27	0.3	New
Ind. Conservative	Henry Pook	27	0.3	New
Majority		2,146	25.7	N/A
Turnout		8,346	52.2	−18.8
Registered electors		15,990		
Conservative gain from Liberal		Swing	+29.8	

1874 general election: Greenwich
Party	Candidate	Votes	%	±%
Conservative	Thomas Boord	6,193	27.0	+5.8
Liberal	William Ewart Gladstone	5,968	26.0	−2.8
Conservative	John Evelyn Liardet	5,561	24.2	+4.5
Liberal	Baxter Langley	5,255	22.9	−7.3
Turnout		11,489 (est)	65.3 (est)	−5.7
Registered electors		17,599		
Majority		938	4.1	N/A
Conservative gain from Liberal		Swing	+6.6	
Majority		407	1.8	−5.8
Liberal hold		Swing	−3.7	

=== Elections in the 1880s ===
1880 general election: Greenwich
Party	Candidate	Votes	%	±%
Conservative	Thomas Boord	9,243	26.6	−0.4
Conservative	Henry de Worms	9,240	26.6	+2.4
Liberal	James Ebenezer Saunders	8,152	23.4	−2.6
Liberal	William Henry Stone	8,141	23.4	+0.5
Majority		1,088	3.2	−0.9
Turnout		17,388 (est)	78.5 (est)	+13.2
Registered electors		22,161		
Conservative hold		Swing	-0.5	
Conservative gain from Liberal		Swing	+2.5	

1885 general election: Greenwich
Party	Candidate	Votes	%	±%
Conservative	Thomas Boord	3,317	52.8	−0.4
Liberal	Herbert Watney	2,961	47.2	+0.4
Majority		356	5.6	+2.4
Turnout		6,278	72.7	−5.8 (est)
Registered electors		8,632		
Conservative hold		Swing	−0.4	

1886 general election: Greenwich
Party	Candidate	Votes	%	±%
Conservative	Thomas Boord	3,240	55.9	+3.1
Liberal	George Crispe Whiteley	2,551	44.1	−3.1
Majority		689	11.8	+6.2
Turnout		5,791	67.1	−5.6
Registered electors		8,632		
Conservative hold		Swing	+3.1	

=== Elections in the 1890s ===
1892 general election: Greenwich
Party	Candidate	Votes	%	±%
Conservative	Thomas Boord	4,200	52.0	−3.9
Liberal	George Crispe Whiteley	3,877	48.0	+3.9
Majority		323	4.0	−7.8
Turnout		8,077	78.8	+11.7
Registered electors		10,256		
Conservative hold		Swing	-3.9	

1895 general election: Greenwich
Party	Candidate	Votes	%	±%
Conservative	Hugh Cecil	4,802	57.4	+5.4
Liberal	George Crispe Whiteley	3,564	42.6	−5.4
Majority		1,238	14.8	+10.8
Turnout		8,366	76.8	−2.0
Registered electors		10,899		
Conservative hold		Swing	+5.4	

=== Elections in the 1900s ===
Jackson

1900 general election: Greenwich
Party	Candidate	Votes	%	±%
Conservative	Hugh Cecil	5,454	61.0	+3.6
Liberal	Richard Jackson	3,484	39.0	−3.6
Majority		1,970	22.0	+7.2
Turnout		8,938	73.0	−3.8
Registered electors		12,247		
Conservative hold		Swing	+3.6	

1906 general election: Greenwich
Party	Candidate	Votes	%	±%
Liberal	Richard Jackson	4,906	45.3	+6.3
Ind. Conservative	Ion Hamilton Benn	3,565	32.9	New
Conservative	Hugh Cecil	2,356	21.8	−39.2
Majority		1,341	12.4	N/A
Turnout		10,827	83.0	+10.0
Registered electors		13,049		
Liberal gain from Conservative		Swing	+22.8	

- Cecil was a free-trader and Benn was a supporter of tariff reform

=== Elections in the 1910s ===
January 1910 general election: Greenwich
Party	Candidate	Votes	%	±%
Conservative	Ion Hamilton Benn	6,284	55.3	+33.5
Liberal	Richard Jackson	5,083	44.7	−0.6
Majority		1,201	10.6	−1.8
Turnout		13,153	86.4	+3.4
Conservative gain from Liberal		Swing	+17.0	

December 1910 general election: Greenwich
Party	Candidate	Votes	%	±%
Conservative	Ion Hamilton Benn	5,697	57.9	+2.6
Liberal	John William Harris	4146	42.1	−2.6
Majority		1,551	15.8	+5.2
Turnout		13,153	74.8	−11.6
Conservative hold		Swing	+2.6	

General election 1918: Greenwich
Party		Candidate	Votes	%	±%
C	Unionist	Ion Hamilton Benn	14,576	69.3	+11.4
	Labour	James Bermingham	6,471	30.7	New
Majority			8,105	38.6	+22.8
Turnout			21,047	48.1	−26.7
Registered electors			43,756		
	Unionist hold		Swing		
C indicates candidate endorsed by the coalition government.

=== Elections in the 1920s ===
Hopwood Hume

General election 1922: Greenwich
Party	Candidate	Votes	%	±%
Unionist	George Hume	16,934	60.9	−8.4
Labour	Edward Timothy Palmer	10,860	39.1	+8.4
Majority		6,074	21.8	−16.8
Turnout		27,794	60.4	+12.3
Registered electors		46,005		
Unionist hold		Swing	−8.4	

General election 1923: Greenwich
Party	Candidate	Votes	%	±%
Labour	Edward Timothy Palmer	12,314	42.7	+3.6
Unionist	George Hume	10,746	37.2	−23.7
Liberal	Charles Garfield Lott Du Cann	5,806	20.1	New
Majority		1,568	5.5	N/A
Turnout		28,866	61.8	+1.4
Registered electors		46,741		
Labour gain from Unionist		Swing	+13.7	

General election 29 October 1924: Greenwich
Party	Candidate	Votes	%	±%
Unionist	George Hume	18,473	51.5	+14.3
Labour	Edward Timothy Palmer	17,409	48.5	+5.8
Majority		1,064	3.0	N/A
Turnout		35,882	75.2	+13.4
Registered electors		47,716		
Unionist gain from Labour		Swing	+4.3	

General election 30 May 1929: Greenwich
Party	Candidate	Votes	%	±%
Labour	Edward Timothy Palmer	20,328	46.3	−2.2
Unionist	George Hume	16,710	38.1	−13.4
Liberal	William Primrose Campbell	6,870	15.6	New
Majority		3,618	8.2	N/A
Turnout		43,908	70.4	−4.8
Registered electors		62,342		
Labour gain from Unionist		Swing	+5.6	

=== Elections in the 1930s ===
General election 1931: Greenwich
Party	Candidate	Votes	%	±%
Conservative	George Hume	29,278	65.0	+26.9
Labour	Edward Timothy Palmer	13,722	30.5	−15.8
Communist	Kath Duncan	2,024	4.5	New
Majority		15,556	34.5	N/A
Turnout		45,024	71.0	+0.6
Registered electors		63,385		
Conservative gain from Labour		Swing	+21.35	

General election 1935: Greenwich
Party	Candidate	Votes	%	±%
Conservative	George Hume	22,526	52.43	−12.60
Labour Co-op	Joseph Reeves	20,436	47.57	+17.09
Majority		2,090	4.86	−29.69
Turnout		49,213	67.79	−3.24
Registered electors		72,599		
Conservative hold		Swing	-14.85	

=== Elections in the 1940s ===
General election 1945: Greenwich
Party	Candidate	Votes	%	±%
Labour	Joseph Reeves	22,078	65.60	+18.03
Conservative	Augustus Agar	11,580	34.40	−18.03
Majority		10,498	31.20	N/A
Turnout		33,658	70.08	+2.20
Registered electors		48,025		
Labour gain from Conservative		Swing	+18.03	

=== Elections in the 1950s ===
General election 1950: Greenwich
Party	Candidate	Votes	%	±%
Labour	Joseph Reeves	29,379	57.85	−7.75
Conservative	Ronald Gilbey	18,255	35.95	+1.55
Liberal	Leslie Maurice Dale	3,148	6.20	New
Majority		11,124	21.90	−9.30
Turnout		50,782	82.73	+12.65
Registered electors		62,132		
Labour hold		Swing	-4.65	

General election 1951: Greenwich
Party	Candidate	Votes	%	±%
Labour	Joseph Reeves	30,326	60.38	+2.53
Conservative	William H Bishop	19,898	39.62	+3.67
Majority		10,428	20.76	−1.14
Turnout		50,224	80.95	−2.03
Registered electors		62,042		
Labour hold		Swing	-0.57	

General election 1955: Greenwich
Party	Candidate	Votes	%	±%
Labour	Joseph Reeves	26,423	58.84	−1.54
Conservative	William F Rhodes	18,484	41.16	+1.54
Majority		7,939	17.68	−3.08
Turnout		44,907	73.24	−7.71
Registered electors		61,314		
Labour hold		Swing	-1.54	

General election 1959: Greenwich
Party	Candidate	Votes	%	±%
Labour	Richard Marsh	25,204	56.15	−2.69
Conservative	J Rodney Holmes	19,679	43.85	+2.69
Majority		5,525	12.30	−5.38
Turnout		44,883	74.11	+0.87
Registered electors		60,561		
Labour hold		Swing	-2.69	

=== Elections in the 1960s ===
General election 1964: Greenwich
Party	Candidate	Votes	%	±%
Labour	Richard Marsh	22,814	56.18	+0.03
Conservative	John Gummer	12,592	31.01	−12.84
Liberal	Michael PD Ellman	5,205	12.82	New
Majority		10,222	25.17	+13.14
Turnout		40,611	71.57	−2.54
Registered electors		56,742		
Labour hold		Swing	+6.44	

General election 1966: Greenwich
Party	Candidate	Votes	%	±%
Labour	Richard Marsh	24,359	64.86	+8.68
Conservative	John Gummer	13,200	35.14	+4.13
Majority		11,159	29.72	+4.55
Turnout		37,559	67.70	−3.87
Registered electors		55,477		
Labour hold		Swing	+6.41	

=== Elections in the 1970s ===
General election 1970: Greenwich
Party	Candidate	Votes	%	±%
Labour	Richard Marsh	20,804	55.75	−9.11
Conservative	J Stuart Thom	13,195	35.36	+0.22
Liberal	Pamela Wylan	3,319	8.89	New
Majority		7,609	20.39	−7.33
Turnout		37,318	65.66	−2.04
Labour hold		Swing	-4.67	

1971 Greenwich by-election
Party	Candidate	Votes	%	±%
Labour	Guy Barnett	14,671	66.73	+10.98
Conservative	J Stuart Thom	6,150	27.97	−7.39
Fellowship	Ronald Stephen Mallone	792	3.60	New
Independent conservative	Reginald Simmerson	285	1.30	New
Independent	David Davies	89	0.40	New
Majority		8,521	38.76	+18.37
Turnout		21,987		
Labour hold		Swing		

General election February 1974: Greenwich
Party	Candidate	Votes	%	±%
Labour	Guy Barnett	20.164	51.29	
Conservative	Suzette Mary Tremlett Harold	11,294	28.73	
Liberal	Alastair James Drysdale Wilson	7,855	19.98	
Majority		8,870	22.56	
Turnout		39,313	75.01	
Labour hold		Swing		

General election October 1974: Greenwich
Party	Candidate	Votes	%	±%
Labour	Guy Barnett	19,155	55.53	+4.24
Conservative	Suzette Mary Tremlett Harold	9,249	26.81	−1.92
Liberal	Alastair James Drysdale Wilson	5,838	16.92	−3.06
Independent	David Green	254	0.74	
Majority		9,906	28.72	
Turnout		34,496	65.29	
Labour hold		Swing	+3.08	

General election 1979: Greenwich
Party	Candidate	Votes	%	±%
Labour	Guy Barnett	18,975	52.1	−3.4
Conservative	Narindar Singh Saroop	12,133	33.3	+6.5
Liberal	Graham Howard Knight	3,870	10.6	−6.3
National Front	Helena Mary Steven	951	2.6	New
Fellowship	Ronald Stephen Mallone	460	1.3	New
Majority		6,842	18.8	−9.9
Turnout		36,389	70.6	+5.3
Labour hold		Swing	-5.0	

1979 notional result
Party	Vote	%
Labour	19,201	52.4
Conservative	12,172	33.2
Liberal	3,893	10.6
Others	1,385	3.8
Turnout	36,651	
Electorate		

=== Elections in the 1980s ===
General election 1983: Greenwich
Party	Candidate	Votes	%	±%
Labour	Guy Barnett	13,361	38.2	−14.2
Conservative	Arthur Rolfe	12,150	34.8	+1.6
SDP (Alliance)	Timothy Ford	8,783	25.1	+14.5
BNP	Ian Dell	259	0.7	New
Fellowship	Ronald Mallone	242	0.7	−0.6
Communist	F. Hook	149	0.4	New
Majority		1,211	3.4	−15.7
Turnout		35,194	67.7	−2.9
Registered electors		51,586		
Labour hold		Swing	–7.9	

By-election 1987: Greenwich
Party	Candidate	Votes	%	±%
SDP (Alliance)	Rosie Barnes	18,287	53.0	+27.9
Labour	Deirdre Wood	11,676	33.8	−4.4
Conservative	John Antcliffe	3,852	11.2	−23.6
Green	Graham Bell	264	0.8	New
Rainbow Dream Ticket	Malcolm Hardee	124	0.3	New
BNP	Ian Dell	116	0.3	−0.4
National Front	Joe Pearce	103	0.3	New
Revolutionary Communist	Kate Marshall	91	0.3	New
Majority		6,611	19.2	+15.8
Turnout		34,513	68.2	−4.5
SDP gain from Labour		Swing	+16.2	

General election 1987: Greenwich
Party	Candidate	Votes	%	±%
SDP (Alliance)	Rosie Barnes	15,149	40.6	+15.5
Labour	Deirdre Wood	13,008	34.9	−3.4
Conservative	John Antcliffe	8,695	23.3	−11.5
Green	Jacqueline Thomas	346	0.9	New
Fellowship	Ronald Mallone	59	0.2	−0.5
Communist	Patricia Clinton	58	0.2	−0.2
Majority		2,141	5.7	N/A
Turnout		37,315	73.4	+5.7
Registered electors		50,830		
SDP gain from Labour		Swing	+9.4	

- swings relative to 1983 election, not 1987 by-election

=== Elections in the 1990s ===
General election 1992: Greenwich
Party	Candidate	Votes	%	±%
Labour	Nick Raynsford	14,630	41.0	+6.1
Ind. Social Democrat	Rosie Barnes	13,273	37.2	–3.4
Conservative	Alison McNair	6,960	19.5	−3.8
Green	Robert H.J. McCracken	483	1.4	+0.5
Fellowship	Ronald Mallone	147	0.4	+0.2
Independent	Malcolm Hardee	103	0.3	New
Natural Law	John D. Small	70	0.2	New
Majority		1,357	3.8	N/A
Turnout		35,666	74.6	+1.2
Registered electors		47,789		
Labour gain from Ind. Social Democrat		Swing	+4.8	

- The swing for Rosie Barnes is relative to her performance in the 1987 general election.

== Bibliography ==
- Leigh Rayment's Historical List of MPs – Constituencies beginning with "G" (part 2)
- British Parliamentary Election Results 1885–1918, compiled and edited by F.W.S. Craig (Macmillan Press 1974)
- Debrett’s Illustrated Heraldic and Biographical House of Commons and the Judicial Bench 1886
- Debrett’s House of Commons and the Judicial Bench 1901
- Debrett’s House of Commons and the Judicial Bench 1918

Parliament of the United Kingdom
Preceded by Buckinghamshire	Constituency represented by the prime minister 1868–1874	Succeeded by Buckinghamshire
