= Ernest Dence =

British politician (1873–1937)

Ernest Martin Dence (17 February 1873 – 24 January 1937) was a British politician, the last member of the Municipal Reform Party to serve as chair of London County Council.

Born in Islington, Dence was educated at Dulwich College and became a marine engineer. He became active in the Conservative Party, and won election to Greenwich Metropolitan Borough Council in 1918. At the 1919 London County Council election, he won a seat in Greenwich for the Municipal Reform Party. He remained active in local politics, serving as Mayor of Greenwich in 1922/23, leaving the borough council in 1925.

In 1928, Dence was appointed as chair of the Housing Committee of the London County Council. In 1931, he became vice-chair of the council, and then from 1933 to 1934, he was its chair. At the 1934 London County Council election, he narrowly lost his seat, and the Labour Party for the first time won control of the council. The following year, he returned to the council as an alderman, serving until his death, early in 1937.

Political offices
Preceded by Eustace Noel Greenwood	Mayor of Greenwich; 1922–1923	Succeeded by Sydney Neale Horne
Preceded by Angus Scott	Chairman of London County Council; 1933–1934	Succeeded by Harry Snell
