= Wakehurst =

Historic house and botanic gardens in West Sussex, England

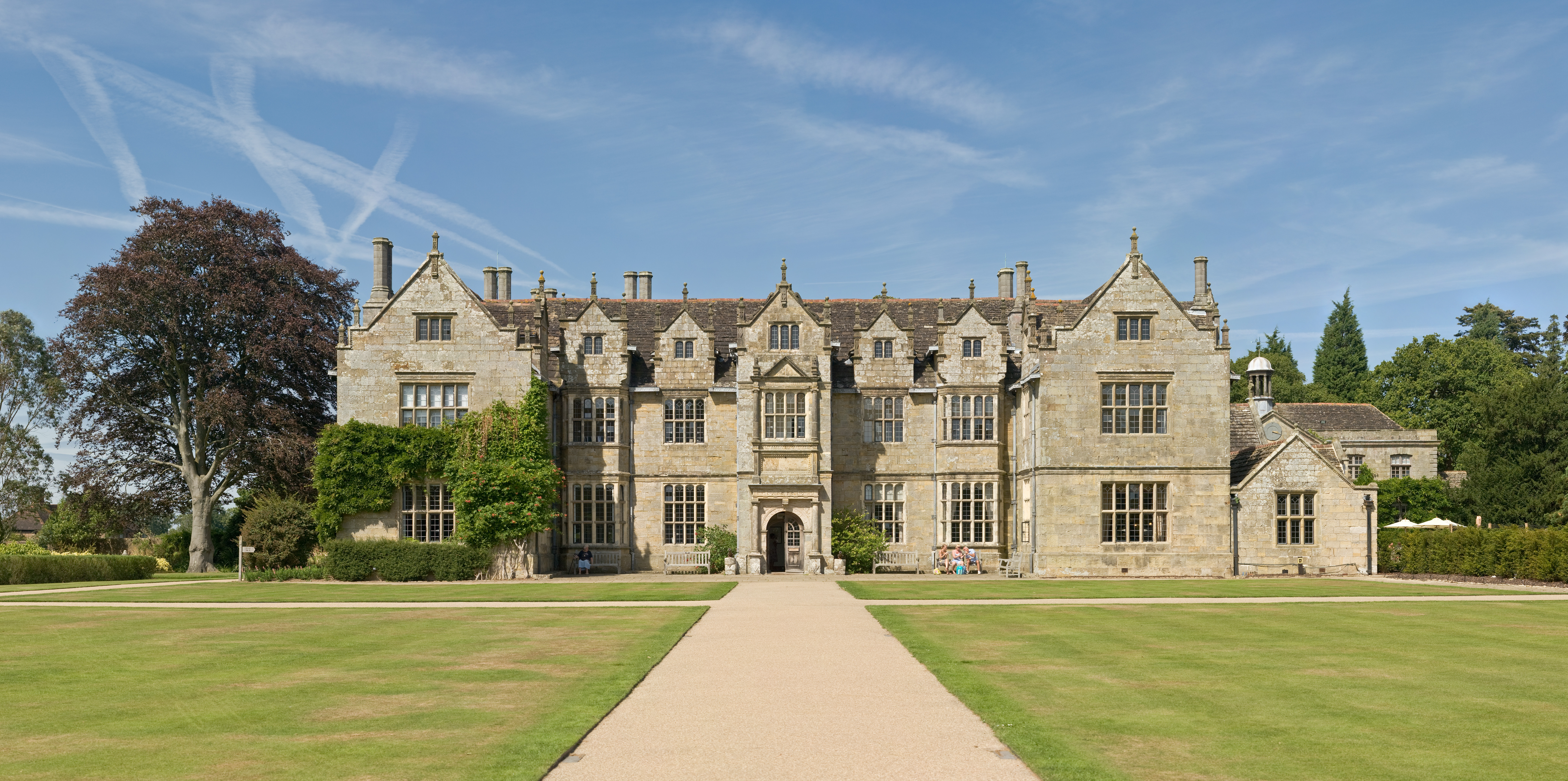
- The mansion at Wakehurst

- Location within West Sussex
- 51°04′02″N 0°05′20″W
- Type: Country house estate
- OS grid reference: TQ 33950 31418

History
- Built: 1590

Site notes
- Area: West Sussex
- Governing body: Royal Botanic Gardens, Kew
- Owner: National Trust

Listed Building – Grade I
- Official name: Wakehurst Place
- Designated: 28 October 1957
- Reference no.: 1025764

National Register of Historic Parks and Gardens
- Official name: Wakehurst Place
- Designated: 1 June 1984
- Reference no.: 1000189

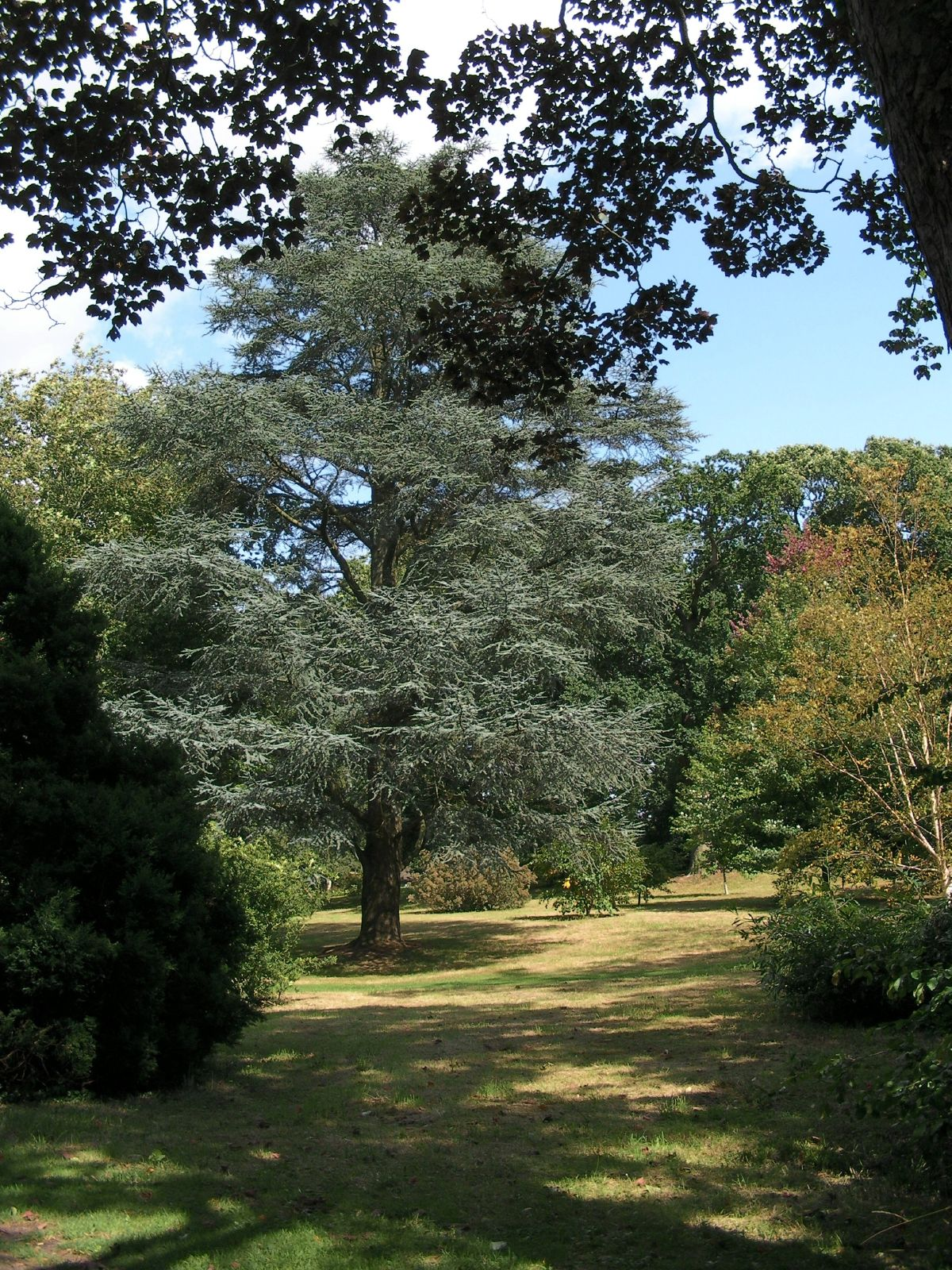
Trees at Wakehurst

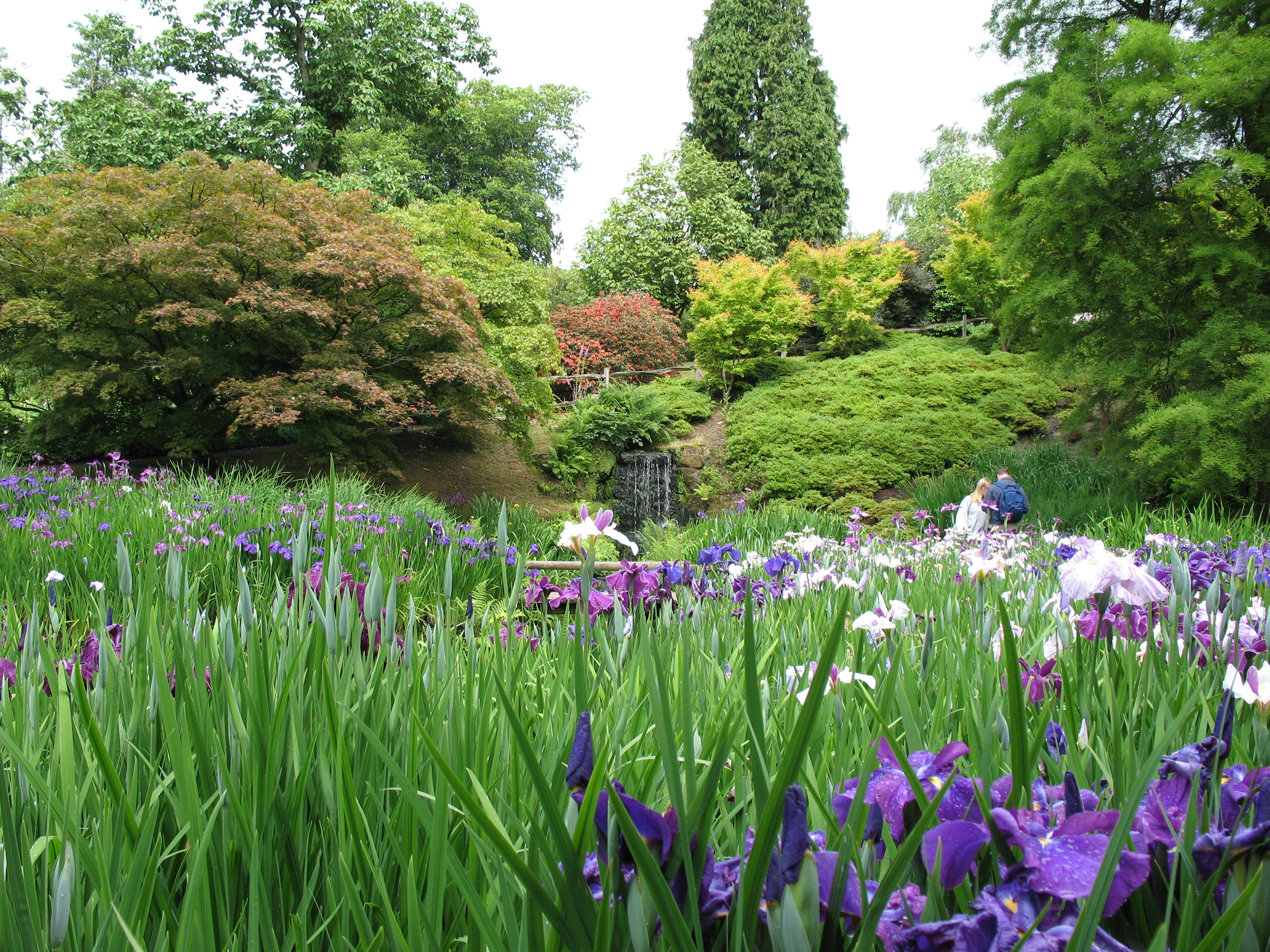
Wakehurst in June

Kew Wakehurst, previously known as Wakehurst and Wakehurst Place, is a house and botanic gardens in West Sussex, England, owned by the National Trust but used and managed by the Royal Botanic Gardens, Kew (RBG Kew). It is near Ardingly, West Sussex in the High Weald (grid reference TQ340315), and comprises a late 16th-century mansion, a mainly 20th-century garden and, in a modern building, Kew's Millennium Seed Bank. Visitors are able to see the gardens and mansion, and also visit the seed bank. The garden today covers some 2 km^{2} (490 acres) and includes walled and water gardens, woodland and wetland conservation areas.

RBG Kew has leased the land from the National Trust since 1965 and much has been achieved in this time, from the Millennium Seed Bank project and the creation of the Loder Valley and Francis Rose Nature Reserves to the introduction of the visitor centre, the Seed café and Stables restaurant, along with the development of the gardens.

Wakehurst is listed Grade I on the National Heritage List for England, and its gardens are listed Grade II* on the Register of Historic Parks and Gardens.

The stables are listed Grade II* and the South Lodge and gateway is listed Grade II.

== History ==
The mansion was built by Sir Edward Culpeper in 1590. It originally formed a complete courtyard prior to being altered various times, and currently has an E-shaped plan. Wakehurst was bought in 1694 by Dennis Lyddell, comptroller of the Treasurer of the Navy's accounts and briefly MP for Harwich. His son Richard Liddell, a profligate rake, was discovered in criminal conversation (adultery) with Lady Bergavenny, wife of William Nevill, 16th Baron Bergavenny. Nevill brought a lawsuit against Liddell who, rather than pay the damages of £10,000, handed the Wakehurst estate over to his younger brother Charles and went abroad. He was later an opposition Whig MP for Bossiney in Cornwall, and briefly Chief Secretary for Ireland.

The house was illustrated in Joseph Nash's The Mansions of England in the Olden Time (1839), pp. 97–98.

It was sold in 1869 to Caroline, Dowager Marchioness of Downshire and then passed to the Boord baronets.

The gardens were largely created by Gerald Loder (later Lord Wakehurst) who purchased the estate in 1903 and spent 33 years developing the gardens. He was succeeded by Sir Henry Price, under whose care the Loder plantings matured. Sir Henry left Wakehurst to the nation in 1963 and the Royal Botanic Gardens took up a lease from the National Trust in 1965. In 1967, Tony Schilling was appointed as Curator of Wakehurst Place where he remained until 1991.

In 1887, American architect Dudley Newton completed a replica of Wakehurst in Newport, Rhode Island, for sportsman and politician James J. Van Alen from plans designed by Charles Eamer Kempe. Salve Regina University purchased the mansion from the Van Alen family in 1972.

In 2022, the mansion was closed for an extensive renovation, predicted to last at least two years.

== National Collections ==
Wakehurst is home to the National Collections of Betula (birches), Hypericum, Nothofagus (Southern Hemisphere beeches) and Skimmia. The Great Storm of 1987 decimated Loder's plantings, toppling 20,000 trees. Since then, Kew has redesigned the gardens to create a walk through the temperate woodlands of the world.

== Millennium Seed Bank ==
The Wellcome Trust Millennium Building, which houses an international seedbank known as the Millennium Seed Bank (run by Kew, not the National Trust), was opened in 2000. The aim of the Millennium Seed Bank is to collect seeds from all of the UK's native flora and conserve seeds from 25% of the world's flora by 2020, in the hope that this will save species from extinction in the wild. This would represent around 75,000 species. By 2025, seeds from almost all UK species that can be stored as seeds were within the seed bank. In addition, seeds of around 40,000 species were stored in the Millennium Seed Bank. This, and its partner organisations had become the world's largest ex-situ plant conservation project.

Nearby, also cared for by Kew, are the Loder Valley Nature Reserve of woodland, meadowland and wetland habitats, and the Francis Rose Reserve, the first devoted to cryptogams (mosses, lichens and ferns).

== Christmas tree ==
Wakehurst is home to the largest growing Christmas tree in England, a giant redwood. The tree stands 35 metres (115 ft) tall and is lit with around 1,800 lights from Advent until Twelfth Night. The lightbulbs on the tree were changed in 2006 to energy-saving lightbulbs, so the tree is not as bright as before but uses less energy.

== In popular culture ==
Much of Kenneth Branagh's 2006 film As You Like It, adapted from Shakespeare's play, was filmed on location at Wakehurst.

On 4 June 2021, the BBC broadcast an episode of Gardeners' World from Wakehurst.

== See also ==
- Kew Gardens
- Listed buildings in England
- Tudor architecture
