= Ion Hamilton Benn =

British politician and businessman (1863–1961)

Captain Sir Ion Hamilton Benn Bt CB DSO KStJ TD
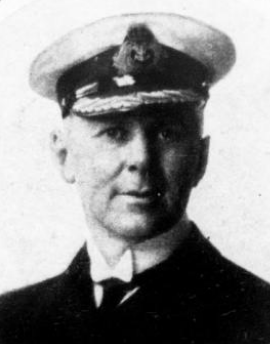
- Benn in an image published after the Zeebrugge Raid

Member of Parliament for Greenwich
- In office January 1910 – November 1922
- Preceded by: Richard Stephens Jackson
- Succeeded by: George Hopwood Hume

Personal details
- Born: 31 March 1863 County Cork, Ireland
- Died: 12 August 1961 (aged 98) Kensington, London, England
- Party: Conservative
- Spouse(s): Frances Charlotte Bridges (m. 1885–1948) (her death) Katharine Winifred Grier (m. 1950–1961) (his death)
- Parent(s): Reverend J. W. Benn; Maria Hamilton
- Education: Merchant Taylors' School
- Occupation: Company director
- Awards: Order of the Bath; Distinguished Service Order; Croix de Guerre (France)

Military service
- Allegiance: United Kingdom of Great Britain and Ireland
- Branch/service: Royal Naval Volunteer Reserve
- Rank: Captain
- Unit: Dover Patrol
- Battles/wars: World War I • Zeebrugge Raid • First Ostend Raid • Second Ostend Raid

Captain Sir Ion Hamilton Benn, 1st Baronet, CB, DSO, KStJ, TD (31 March 1863 – 12 August 1961) was a British politician and businessman. He was a Conservative member of parliament from 1910 to 1922.

== Early life, family and business career ==
Benn was born in County Cork, Ireland. He was the third son of the Reverend J. W. Benn, Church of Ireland rector of Carrigaline and Douglas, and his wife Maria (née Hamilton). He was educated at Merchant Taylors' School and then joined Price & Pierce Ltd, a leading timber firm. He later became a director and then chairman.

In 1885 he married Frances Charlotte Bridges, with whom he had two children.

== Political career ==
In 1900, he was elected to Greenwich Borough Council and served as mayor from 1901 to 1902. He was a founder member of the Metropolitan Water Board in 1903. He was a Municipal Reform Party member of London County Council representing Greenwich from 1907 to 1910. At the 1906 general election he was chosen by the Tariff Reform faction in the Conservative Party to stand against Lord Hugh Cecil the sitting Conservative MP for Greenwich who was in favour of free trade. While Benn succeeded in beating Cecil, the split in the Conservative vote allowed Richard Stephens Jackson of the Liberal Party to take the seat. At the next general election in January 1910 he was the sole Conservative candidate in the constituency and was elected to parliament. In parliament, he was a leading opponent of Irish Home Rule.

== Military career ==
On 26 May 1906 he was appointed Honorary Colonel of the 2nd Volunteer Battalion, Queen's Own Royal West Kent Regiment, which on 1 April 1908 became the 20th Battalion, London Regiment (Blackheath and Woolwich).

A long-time member of the Royal Naval Volunteer Reserve, Benn saw active service in the First World War, being commissioned into the Royal Naval Reserve with the temporary rank of lieutenant-commander on 12 October 1914, and receiving promotion to temporary commander in the Royal Naval Volunteer Reserve on 10 April 1915.

For three years he was the commander of a flotilla of Motor Launches in the Dover Patrol, taking part in the Zeebrugge Raid and the First and Second Ostend Raids.

He was Mentioned in Despatches three times, and on 20 July 1917 was appointed a Companion of the Distinguished Service Order in recognition of his services at Zeebrugge on 11–12 May 1917, and at Ostend on 4–5 June 1917. He was also awarded the Croix de Guerre by France in recognition of his services at Zeebrugge and at Ostend on 22–23 April 1918, and on 28 August 1918 was appointed a Companion of the Order of the Bath (Military Division), in recognition of his distinguished services during the Second Ostend Raid.

== Post-war ==
Benn was created a baronet in the June 1920 Birthday Honours for his political services. He retired from parliament at the 1922 election.

On 23 June 1925 Benn was made a knight of the Grand Priory of the Order of the Hospital of Saint John of Jerusalem in England, and on 11 May 1926 received the Territorial Decoration. Benn served on the executive committee of the National Playing Fields Association from its inaugural meeting at the Royal Albert Hall in July 1925.

From 1937 he was chairman of the seamen's Dreadnought Hospital in Greenwich, and became its president in 1949, serving until 1962.

Benn was once again a member of the London County Council from 1937 to 1946. He served on the Thames Conservancy Board from 1937 to 1946, and was a director of the Port of London Authority from its foundation in 1909 until February 1961, when he was 97. He remained active in business in the City of London until his death at the age of 98.

Benn's first wife died in 1948. He married Katharine Winifred Grier of Montreal, Canada in 1950, when he was aged 87. He died at his Kensington home in August 1961, aged 98.

Parliament of the United Kingdom
Preceded by Richard Jackson	Member of Parliament for Greenwich; January 1910 – 1922	Succeeded by George Hume
Baronetage of the United Kingdom
New creation	Baronet (of Rollesby); 1920 – 1961	Succeeded by Patrick Ion Hamilton Benn
