= Richard Jackson (Liberal politician) =

Jackson

Richard Stephens Jackson (7 May 1850 – 10 June 1938) was a British solicitor and Liberal Party politician.

== Early life ==
Born in Newington in north Kent, Jackson was the son of John Jackson of Sittingbourne, a surveyor, and his wife Harriet née Tress of Upchurch. Following education at Elm House School in Sittingbourne, he spent some time as a merchant seaman, before being admitted as a solicitor in 1872. He practised in that Sittingbourne, Greenwich and London. As of 1895, he was practising at Thorner's Chambers, Ingham Court, 167 Fenchurch Street.

== London County Council ==
He entered politics when he was elected to represent Greenwich on the first London County Council in January 1889. He was a member of the majority Progressive Party on the council, which was allied to the parliamentary Liberal Party. He was re-elected in 1892. On the council he took a particular interest in progressing the construction of the Blackwall Tunnel. He lost his county council seat in 1895 to a member of the Conservative-backed Moderate Party, largely due to the intervention of an Independent Labour Party candidate.

== 1900 general election ==
Jackson contested the 1900 general election as the Liberal Party's candidate at Greenwich, standing against the sitting Conservative MP Lord Hugh Cecil. Jackson failed to be elected, with Cecil retaining the seat by a majority of nearly 2,000 votes.

== Greenwich Borough Council ==
Jackson was a member of the Greenwich Vestry and Board of Works. In 1900 the vestry was abolished and the County of London was divided into twenty-eight metropolitan boroughs, with the first elections to the new borough councils held 1 November 1900. Jackson was elected to Greenwich Borough Council as a Progressive Party councillor, representing the South Ward. He was mayor of Greenwich in 1902–1903.

== Member of parliament ==
At the general election of 1906 Jackson again stood at Greenwich in opposition to Lord Hugh Cecil. The Conservative vote was split between Cecil, who advocated free trade and Ion Hamilton Benn who stood as an advocate of Tariff Reform. Jackson won the seat for the Liberals with a majority over Benn 1,341 votes. Cecil finished a poor third. Jackson only served one term in parliament, and was defeated by Benn at the next election in January 1910.

== Later life ==
Jackson resumed his legal practice. He eventually retired to Blackheath, where he died in June 1938, aged 88. Following a funeral at St Alfege Church, Greenwich, he was buried in Shooters Hill Cemetery.

== Personal life ==
Jackson and his wife, Mary Ann, née Bell, had nine children, one of whom died in infancy. Their sixth, William Henry Jackson, was an Anglican priest who served as a missionary in Burma (now Myanmar), and invented Burmese Braille.

Not long after the birth of William, the family moved to Stobcross Lodge, at Crooms Hill, Blackheath, where they remained for around two decades.

Mary Ann's death in late July or early August 1931 preceded that of William, which was in December that year.

Parliament of the United Kingdom
Preceded by Lord Hugh Cecil	Member of Parliament for Greenwich; 1906–1910	Succeeded by Ion Hamilton Benn
