= 1868 Greenwich by-election =

UK parliamentary by-election

The 1868 Greenwich by-election was held on 21 December 1868. The by-election was held due to the incumbent Liberal MP, William Ewart Gladstone, becoming the prime minister and First Lord of the Treasury. It was retained by Gladstone, who was unopposed.
