= Thomas Boord =

British politician (1838–1912)

Sir Thomas William Boord, 1st Baronet, VD JP FSA (14 July 1838 – 2 May 1912) was a British Conservative Party politician.

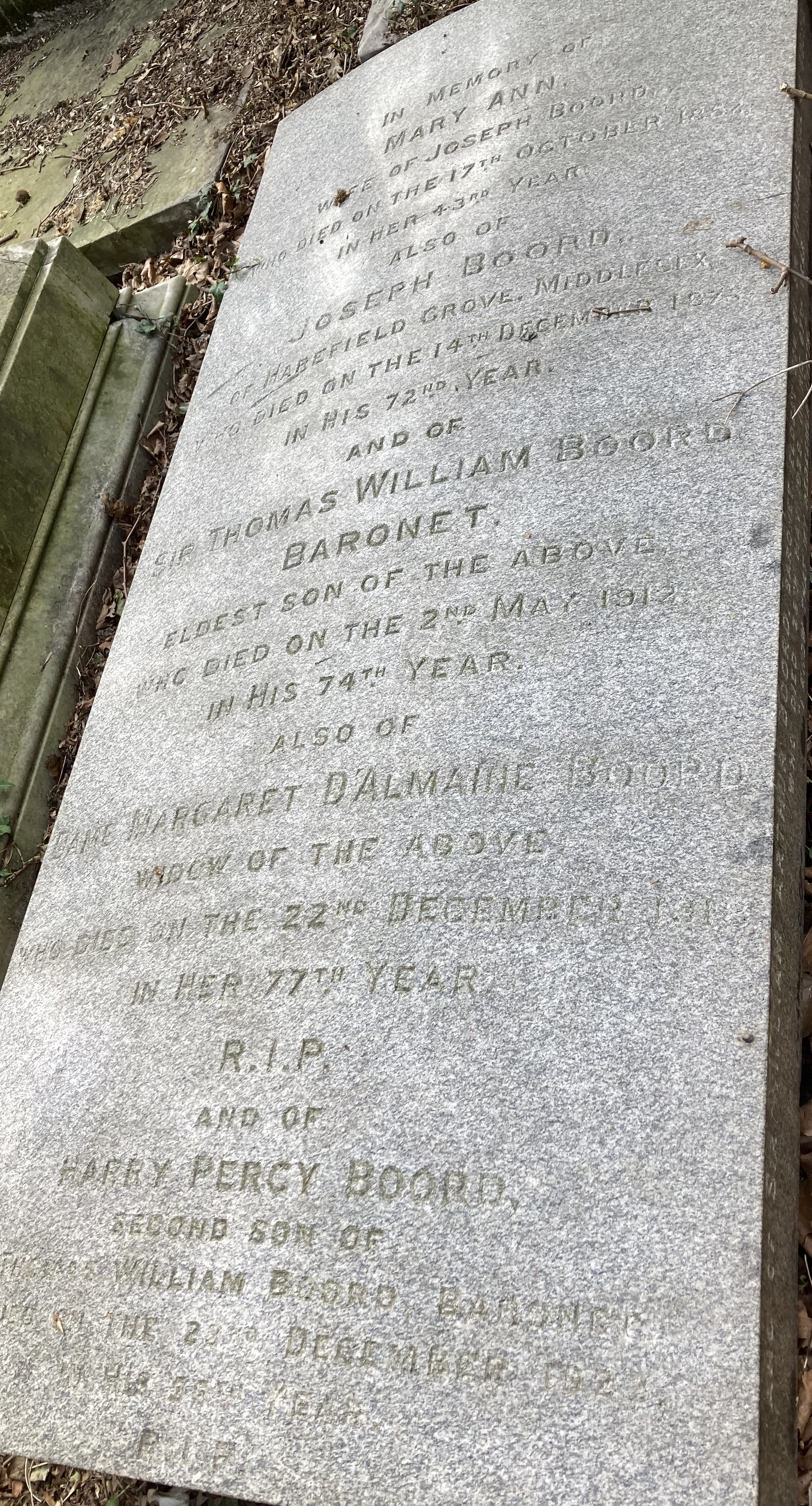
Family grave of Sir Thomas William Boord in Highgate Cemetery

Boord was the son of Joseph Boord and his wife Mary Ann (née Newstead). He was elected as Member of Parliament (MP) for Greenwich a by-election in August 1873, and held the seat until he stood down at the 1895 general election. Apart from his political career he was a Captain the 1st Volunteer Battalion of the King's Royal Rifle Corps, a justice of the peace and a fellow of the Society of Antiquaries. On 18 February 1896 he was created a baronet, of Wakehurst Place in the County of Sussex.

Boord married Margaret, daughter of Thomas George Mackinlay, in 1861. They had three sons and two daughters.

He died on 2 May 1912, aged 73, and was buried in a family grave on the west side of Highgate Cemetery.

He was succeeded in the baronetcy by his eldest son William.

Lady Boord died on 22 December 1918.

== Notes ==
Parliament of the United Kingdom
Preceded by William Ewart Gladstone; David Salomons	Member of Parliament for Greenwich; 1873 – 1895; With: William Ewart Gladstone to 1880; Baron Henry de Worms 1880–1885	Succeeded by Lord Hugh Cecil
Baronetage of the United Kingdom
New creation	Baronet (of Wakehurst Place); 1896–1912	Succeeded by William Arthur Boord
