= Boord baronets =

Baronetcy in the Baronetage of the United Kingdom

- Escutcheon of the Boord baronets of Wakehurst Place
- Creation date: 1896
- Status: extant
- Motto: Virtute et industria, By integrity and industry

The Boord Baronetcy, of Wakehurst Place in the County of Sussex, is a title in the Baronetage of the United Kingdom. It was created on 18 February 1896 for the Conservative politician Thomas Boord. His eldest son, the second Baronet, died unmarried in 1928 and was succeeded by his nephew, the third Baronet. He was the son of Alexander Edgar Boord, third son of the first Baronet. The third Baronet's eldest son, the fourth Baronet, succeeded in 1975. On his death in 2019, the title passed to his nephew Andrew, an Istanbul-based translator and business development consultant.

== Boord baronets, of Wakehurst Place (1896) ==
- Sir Thomas William Boord, 1st Baronet (1838–1912)
- Sir William Arthur Boord, 2nd Baronet (1862–1928)
- Sir Richard William Boord, 3rd Baronet (1907–1975)
- Sir Nicolas John Charles Boord, 4th Baronet (1936–2019)
- Sir Andrew Richard Boord, 5th Baronet (born 1962), nephew of the 4th baronet.

There is no heir to the title.

== Notes ==
Baronetage of the United Kingdom
Preceded by Coddington baronets	Boord baronets of Wakehurst Place; 18 February 1896	Succeeded by Seely baronets
