= L'Ami du peuple =

18th-century French newspaper

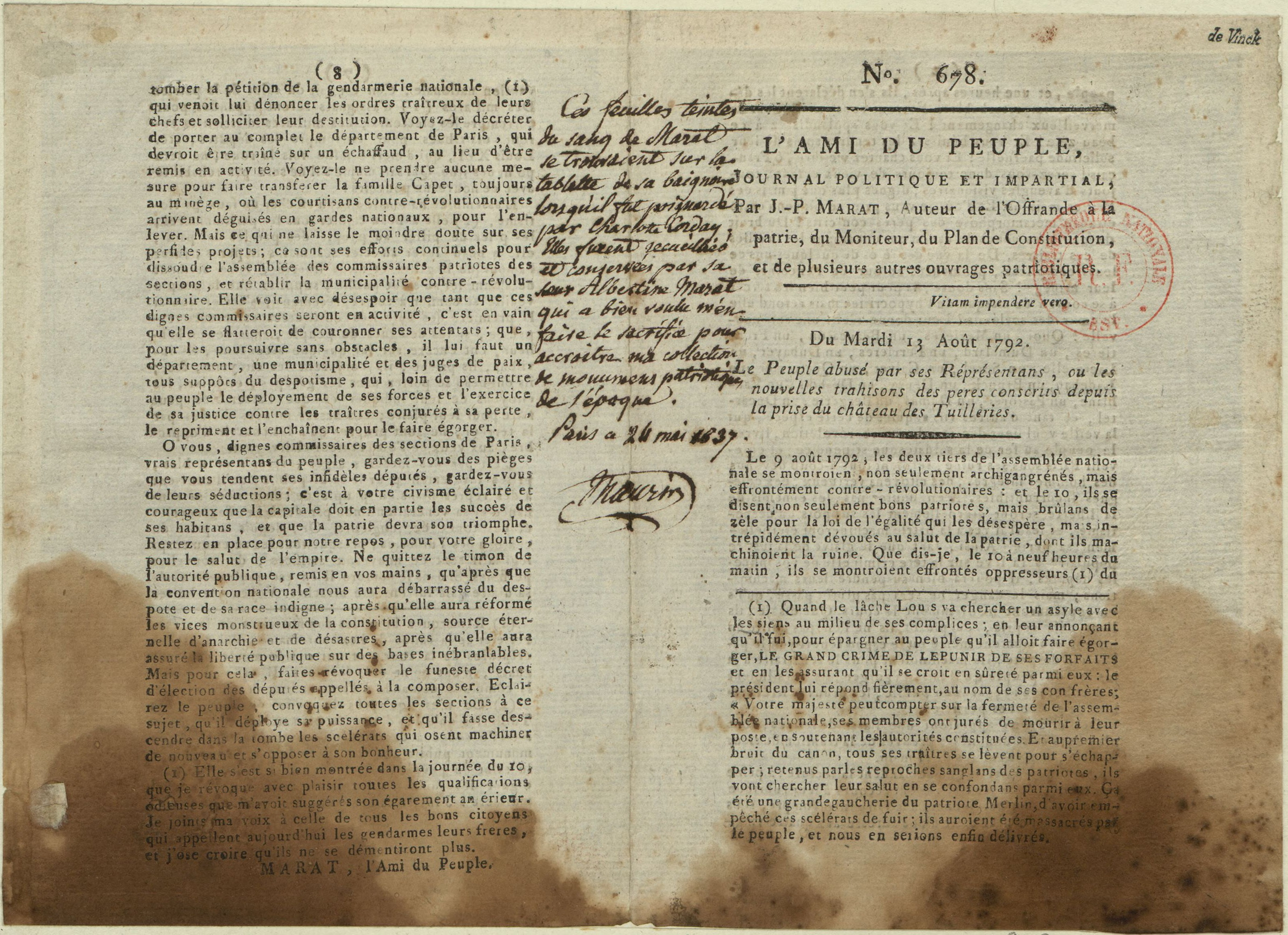
- Bloodstained copy of L'Ami du peuple no. 678 (13 August 1792). The provenance note was added by Antoine Maurin.
- Founder: Jean-Paul Marat
- Founded: 12 September 1789
- Ceased publication: 21 September 1792
- Language: French
- Headquarters: Paris
- Country: France

L'Ami du peuple (French: [lami dy pœpl], The Friend of the People) was a newspaper written and published by Jean-Paul Marat during the French Revolution. Described by historian Jeremy D. Popkin as "the most celebrated radical paper of the Revolution", it advocated popular sovereignty and the interests of the lower classes. Marat used the newspaper to denounce political figures and institutions whom he regarded as enemies of the Revolution, frequently identifying individuals by name and sometimes by occupation and address, and at times calling for popular violence.

In 1789, Marat was elected to the electoral assembly of the Carmes-Déchaussés district in Paris. He proposed publishing a journal to keep local voters informed about political events, but when the assembly rejected the proposal, he resigned and decided to publish one himself. The first issue, entitled Le Publiciste parisien, appeared on 12 September 1789. After several issues, he renamed it L'Ami du peuple.

== Early struggles ==
The journal was printed in octavo format and was usually eight pages long, occasionally expanding to twelve or sixteen pages. Marat normally published L’Ami du Peuple daily, but publication was repeatedly interrupted when he went into hiding to avoid arrest. His attacks on political figures and institutions, including Jacques Necker, Jean Sylvain Bailly, the comte de Mirabeau, the Marquis de Lafayette, the Paris authorities and successive national assemblies, led to repeated attempts to arrest him and suppress the journal. His press was destroyed and copies of L’Ami du peuple confiscated on at least two occasions. On one occasion, his printer was arrested and the printing formes for a particularly controversial issue were destroyed.

Title page of Nouvelle dénonciation contre Necker (1790)

Marat also used the newspaper to intervene directly in contemporary political and economic debates. In May 1791, Marat devoted an issue to proposals for preventing national bankruptcy and restoring specie to circulation, discussing the assignats, the sale of biens nationaux, public debt and financial speculation.

During the electoral assemblies of June 1791, Marat published lists of men whom he considered unsuitable as electors, giving their names, occupations and addresses. In issue no. 496 of 21 June, he continued a list of "rotten aristocrats" of the Théâtre-Français section and published another of "bad subjects" in the Quinze-Vingts section. In the same issue, Marat warned that the royal family was preparing to flee and called on towns, in the event of the king's flight, to close their gates and put anti-revolutionary conspirators to death.

Marat used much of his own money to finance the publication of L’Ami du peuple. In early 1792, after returning from a two-month stay in England, financial difficulties interrupted publication. With financial support from Simonne Évrard, he was able to resume the journal. After the overthrow of the monarchy on 10 August 1792, the Committee of Police and Surveillance of the Paris Commune placed four printing presses confiscated from the royal printing establishment at Marat's disposal. His new imprimerie de Marat was established in the basement of the Cordeliers Convent.

== National Convention ==
On 9 September 1792, Marat was elected to the National Convention. On 25 September, he began publishing the Journal de la République française, which succeeded L'Ami du peuple. In the new journal, Marat continued to attack political and military figures whom he regarded as threats to the French First Republic. Among them was General Charles François Dumouriez, whose policies in the Austrian Netherlands and plans to invade the Dutch Republic Marat repeatedly criticized in late 1792 and early 1793.

In April 1793, the Girondins passed a law, later repealed, prohibiting members of the Convention from simultaneously serving as legislators and journalists. In response, Marat renamed his journal Publiciste de la Révolution française, maintaining that he was a publicist rather than a journalist. It continued under this title until his death.

Following the Insurrection of 31 May – 2 June 1793 and the fall of the Girondins, Marat resigned from the Convention on 3 June. His journal during this period consisted largely of letters from correspondents. On Saturday evening, 13 July, Marat was murdered by Charlotte Corday. The final issue of the Publiciste de la Révolution française appeared the following day.

== Circulation ==
In all, L’Ami du peuple ran to nearly seven hundred issues, while Marat's subsequent journals published during the Convention ran to nearly 250 issues, in addition to his numerous pamphlets. Counterfeit editions circulated during periods when Marat was in hiding and after his death, produced both by sympathizers and by opponents seeking to misrepresent him.

In March 1793, Marat gave a retrospective account of the development of his journalism. He claimed that he had initially adopted a "severe but honest tone", but, frustrated by what he regarded as the misconduct of political representatives and public officials, gradually turned to satire and increasingly violent rhetoric. He wrote that he eventually became convinced that the enemies of the Revolution could be overcome only by force and called on the people to take justice into their own hands.

== Printing and Printers ==
Marat initially relied on commercial printers for his revolutionary publications. The first issue of the Publiciste parisien, later renamed L'Ami du peuple, was printed by the widow of Jean-Thomas Hérissant in the fr:rue Neuve-Notre-Dame. He subsequently used Jorry in the rue de la Huchette, and by November 1789 the journal bore the imprint Imprimerie patriotique. As his writings became increasingly controversial, printers became reluctant to accept his work. In December 1789, Marat stated that he had offered his Dénonciation contre Necker to ten printers, all of whom refused it, forcing him, as he put it, to become a printer himself.

Political persecution repeatedly disrupted these arrangements. During Marat's flight to England in early 1790, he continued to write for a French audience while some of his works were printed or distributed in Paris. His Lettre sur l'ordre judiciaire, for example, was printed by Caillot in the rue Saint-André-des-Arcs, while the Nouvelle dénonciation contre Necker appeared with the imprint « Londres, et se trouve à Paris, chez les marchands de nouveautés ». During his absence, several counterfeit versions of L'Ami du peuple appeared. After Marat returned to Paris, publication of the genuine journal resumed on 18 May 1790, with J. Grand of the fr:rue du Foin-Saint-Jacques as Marat's new printer.
