= Abraham-Louis Breguet =

Inventor of the wristwatch (1747–1823)

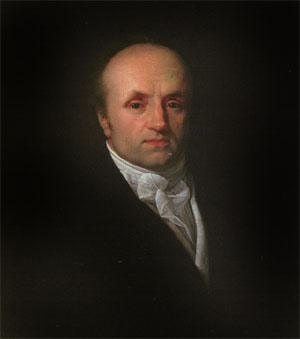
- Born: 10 January 1747; Neuchâtel, Principality of Neuchâtel
- Died: 17 September 1823 (aged 76); Paris, France
- Resting place: Père Lachaise Cemetery, Paris
- Occupations: Horologist, Inventor
- Organization: Breguet
- Notable work: Tourbillon Mechanism
- Spouse: Cécile Marie-Louise L'Huillier (– 1780)
- Children: Antoine-Louis Breguet

Abraham-Louis Breguet (English: /brɛˈɡeɪ/, French: [abʁa.am lwi bʁeɡɛ]; 10 January 1747 – 17 September 1823) was a French horologist who made many innovations in the course of a career in watchmaking industry, including the tourbillon. He was the founder of the Breguet company, which is now a luxury watch division of the Swiss Swatch Group.

In his lifetime he was considered the leading watchmaker of his day, and he built up a clientele that included many leading public figures and members of the European nobility.

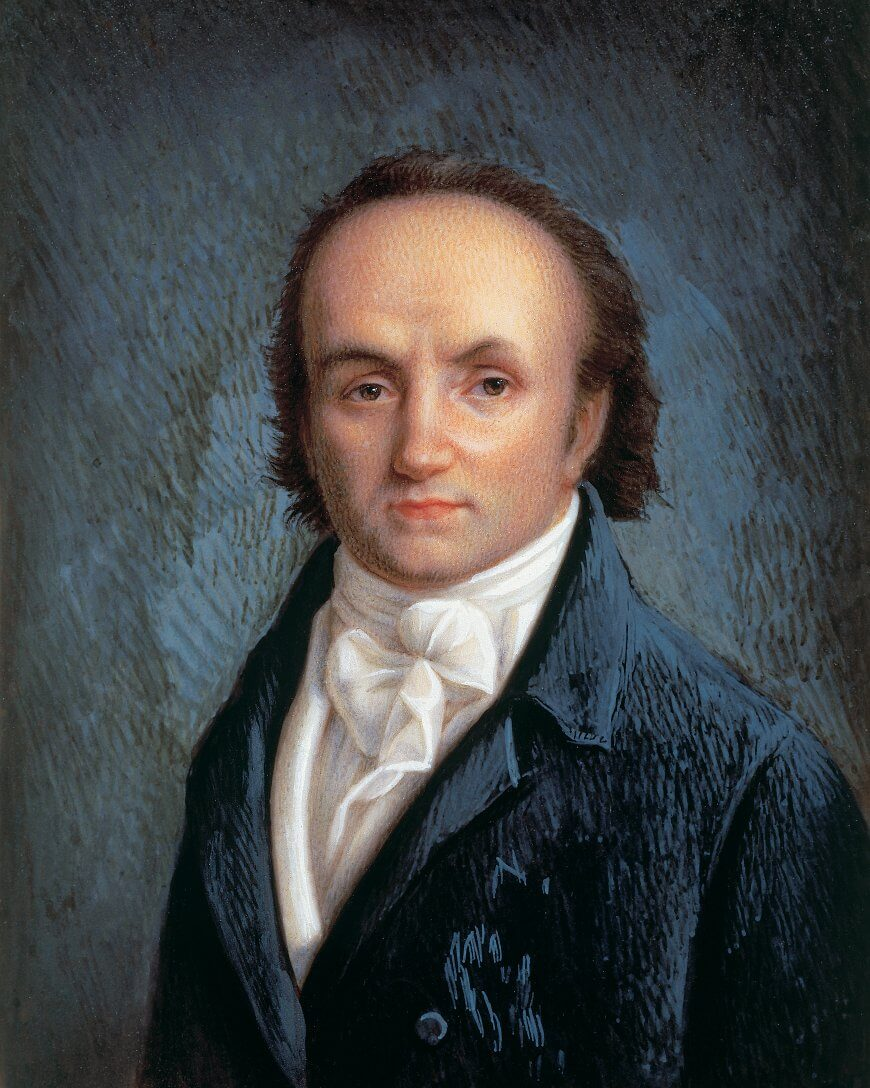
Abraham-Louis Breguet, circa 1800

Alongside his friend and contemporary John Arnold, Breguet is now widely acknowledged as one of the greatest horologists of all time. One of his famous ancestors was Jean Breguet (who died in 1593) a Protestant pastor in Neuchâtel very much influenced by the ideas of John Calvin.

== Life ==
Breguet was born in Neuchâtel, Principality of Neuchâtel to Jonas-Louis Breguet and Suzanne-Marguerite Bolle. Breguet's father died in 1758 when he was ten, and his formal schooling ended when he was 12. Breguet's mother remarried Joseph Tattet, who came from a family of watchmakers. Tattet had a showroom in Paris; the family tried for some time to entice the young Breguet into the trade, to no avail, but he eventually took to it with great interest and in 1762, aged 15, he was sent to be apprenticed to an unknown Versailles master-watchmaker. At this time the Court had a great influence on the trade and the best watchmakers established themselves around Versailles.

The young Breguet soon "astonished" his master with his aptitude and intelligence, and to further his education he took evening classes in mathematics at the Collège Mazarin under Abbé Marie, who became a friend and mentor to the young watchmaker. Through his role as tutor to the dukes of Angoulême and de Berri, Abbé Marie was able to arrange for Breguet to be introduced to King Louis XVI of France, and the king's interest in mechanics led to many royal commissions for the rising watchmaker, including a perpetuelle (self-winding watch), with which the king was especially pleased. Unfortunately, Marie met a tragic end, either through murder or suicide, and soon after Breguet lost both his mother and his step-father, leaving him to support himself and his younger sister. How he managed this in the period between his parents' deaths and the establishment of his business is unknown.

Breguet was allowed to marry in 1775 after finishing his apprenticeship. He and his bride, Cécile Marie-Louise L'Huillier, set up their home and the Breguet watchmaking company; its first known address was at 51, quai de l'Horloge in the Île de la Cité in Paris (by the 1920s this location was designated as #39). Ca. 1812 the firm's address was 79, quai de l'Horloge du Palais, although Salomons speculated that this might have been merely a change of number and name, not of the actual location. By the year of Breguet's death in 1823, the firm also had a shop at 4, place de la Bourse, which is known because both addresses appear on the label of watch #4004. The firm later moved to Rue de la Paix and in the early 20th century to 2, rue Édouard-VII.

Breguet invented or developed innovative escapements, including the tourbillon, automatic winding mechanisms, and the overcoil (an improvement of the balance spring with a raised outer coil). Within ten years Breguet had commissions from the aristocratic families of France and even the French queen, Marie Antoinette. Cécile died in 1780. He met Abraham-Louis Perrelet in Switzerland and became a Master Clockmaker in 1784. In 1787 Abraham-Louis established a partnership with Xavier Gide, which lasted until 1791.

Ca. 1792 the Duke of Orléans went to England and met John Arnold, Europe's leading watch and clockmaker. The Duke showed Arnold a clock made by Breguet, who was so impressed that he immediately travelled to Paris and asked Breguet to accept his son as an apprentice.

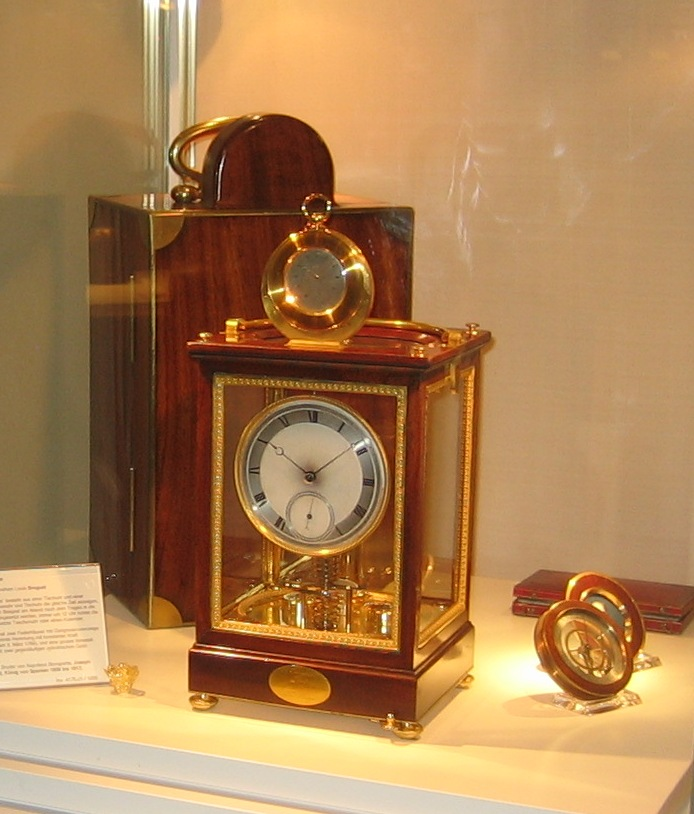
Uhrenmuseum Beyer: Pendule Sympathique, made ca. 1795, by Abraham-Louis Breguet, Paris

As Breguet's fame gradually increased he became friendly with revolutionary leader Jean-Paul Marat, who also hailed from Neuchâtel. Salomons' biography records that Marat and Breguet were at the house of a mutual friend one day when an angry crowd gathered outside, shouting "Down with Marat!", but Breguet contrived their escape by disguising Marat as an old woman, and they left the house arm in arm, unmolested. In 1793 Marat discovered that Breguet was marked for the guillotine, possibly because of his friendship with Abbé Marie (and/or his association with the royal court); in return for his own earlier rescue, Marat arranged for a safe-pass that enabled Breguet to escape to Switzerland, from where he travelled to England. He remained there for two years, during which time he worked for King George III. When the political scene in France stabilised, Breguet returned to Paris. Marat's sister, Albertine, was a skilled maker of watch hands and later supplied the Paris firm Breguet.

In 1795 Breguet returned to Paris with many ideas for innovations in watch and clock making. He set up business again in Quai de l'Horloge and quickly established a reputation among the new wealthy classes in the Empire. Breguet did not staff his workshops in the traditional way, with unskilled apprentices, but instead sought out the finest available watchmakers in Paris, whom he employed to make watches to his own designs. At the 1798 Exposition des produits de l'industrie française Breguet was given an honorable distinction, the highest award, for "a free escapement with constant force, applicable to the improvement of both astronomical clocks and longitude clocks. This clock has the very singular effect of resetting the time in a watch."

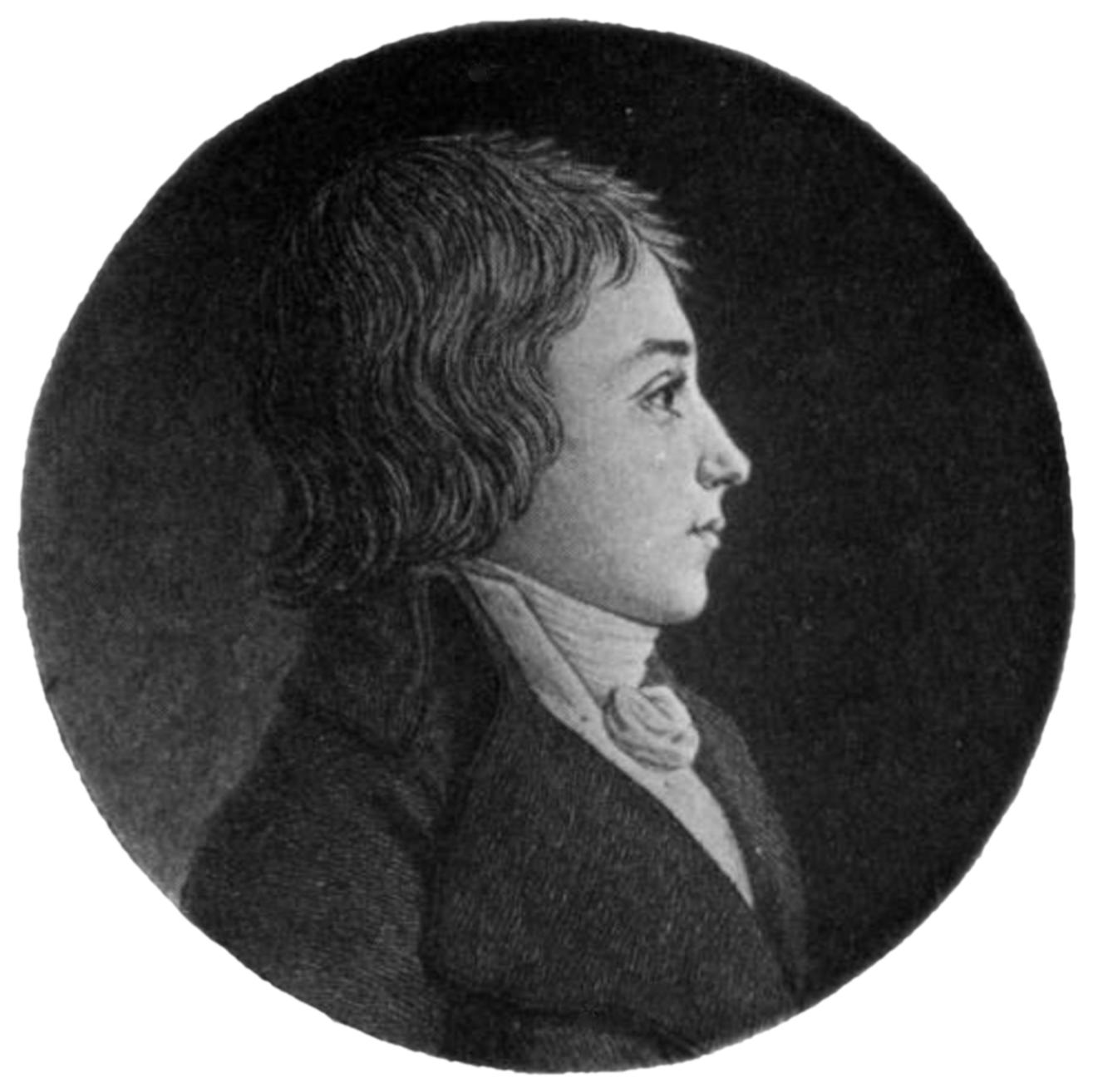
Antoine-Louis Breguet (1776-1858), French clockmaker

Circa 1807 Breguet brought in his son, Antoine-Louis (born 1776) as a business partner, and from this point, the firm became known as Breguet et Fils. Breguet had previously sent his son to London to study with the great English chronometer maker, John Arnold, and such was the mutual friendship and respect between the two men that Arnold, in turn, sent his son, John Roger, to spend time with Breguet. Breguet met another watchmaker Louis Moinet, recognised his worth at once, and the two men worked closely together. From 1811 on, Moinet became Breguet's personal adviser.

Breguet became a member of the Bureau des Longitudes in 1814 and the following year gained an official appointment as chronometer-maker to the French Navy. He entered the French Academy of Sciences in 1816 as a full member, and received the Chevalier of the Legion of Honour from the hands of Louis XVIII in 1819. In 1822 the future engineer Isambard Kingdom Brunel, then aged sixteen, studied for some months with Breguet in Paris. Brunel had a French father so he spoke perfect French.

According to Salomons' biography, Breguet was known for his kindness and good humour. It is recorded that if a workman came to Breguet with a finished piece of work and an invoice for payment, and Breguet was satisfied with the work, then if the invoice ended in a zero, Breguet would add a tail to the zero to make it a '9', thereby enabling the workman to be paid nine francs more than he had asked for. He was also known for his encouragement of his young apprentices, often advising them "Do not be discouraged, or allow failure to dishearten you."

The business grew from strength to strength, and when Abraham-Louis Breguet died in 1823 it was carried on by Antoine-Louis. After Antoine-Louis retired in 1833 (he died in 1858) the business continued under Abraham-Louis' grandson Louis François Clément Breguet (1804–1883); his great-grandson Louis Antoine (1851–1882) was the last of the Breguet family to run the business. Although he had two sons and a daughter, they did not enter the business, so he took on noted English watchmaker Edward Brown of Clerkenwell to look after the Paris factory. Brown eventually became his partner and, after Breguet's death, the owner and head of the company. His sons Edward and Henry Brown headed the firm into the 20th century and after Edward retired in the early 1900s, Henry became the sole proprietor.

== Works and influence ==
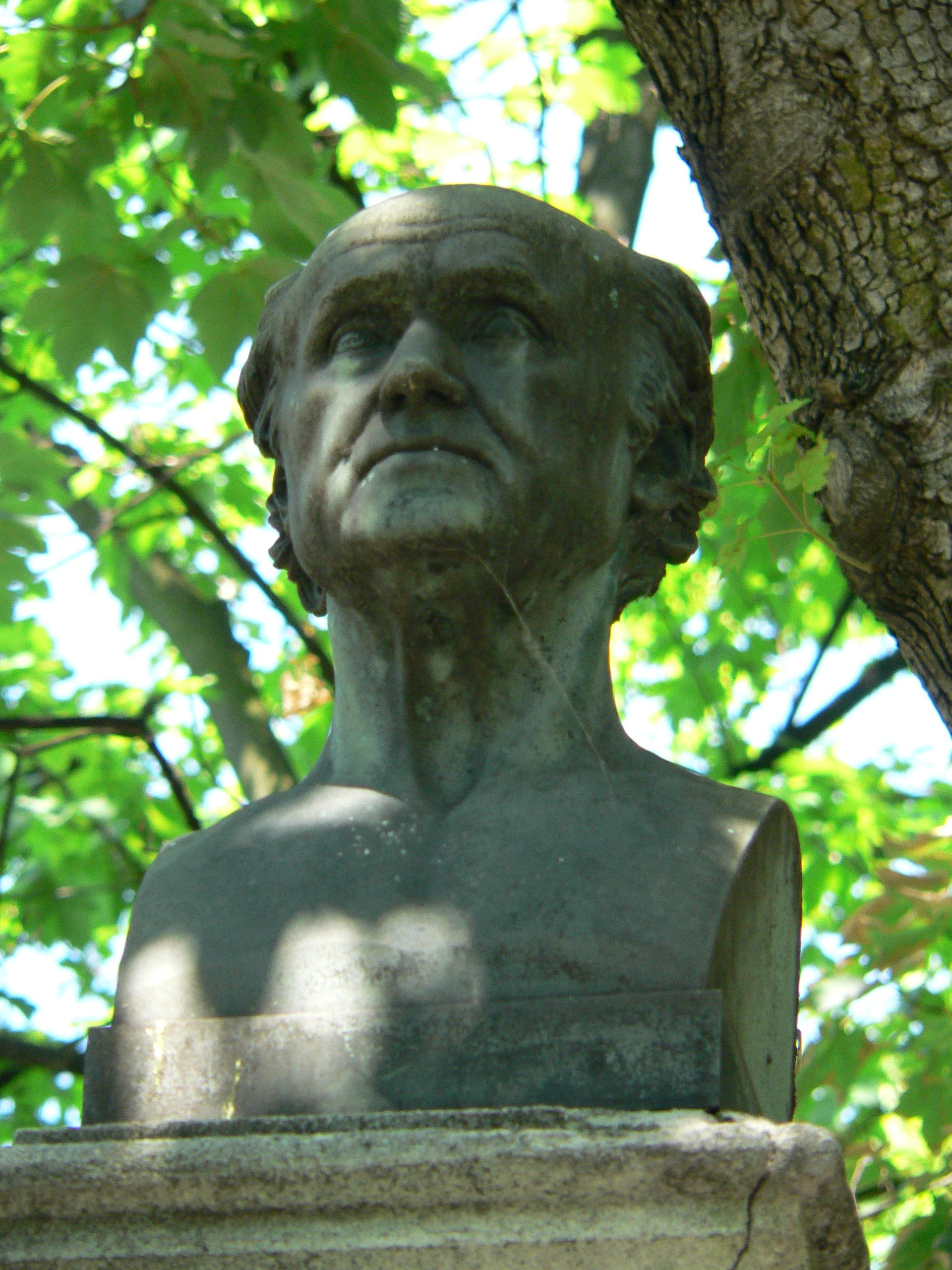
Statue of Abraham Louis Breguet in Père Lachaise Cemetery

Breguet made three series of watches, and the highest numbering of the three reached 5120, so in all, it is estimated that the firm produced around 17,000 timepieces during Breguet's life. Because of his minute attention to detail and his constant experimentation, no two Breguet pieces are exactly alike. Following his introduction to the court, Queen Marie-Antoinette developed a fascination for Breguet's unique self-winding watch and Louis XVI of France bought several pieces. His achievements soon attracted a wealthy and influential clientele that comprised a veritable "Who's Who" of the period: Louis XVI and his Queen Marie-Antoinette, Napoleon Bonaparte, Joséphine de Beauharnais, Louis XVIII, Alexander I of Russia, George IV of the United Kingdom, Arthur Wellesley, 1st Duke of Wellington.

Legend has it that it was the ill-fated French queen herself who commissioned Breguet's masterpiece, the "Marie Antoinette" (No. 160), which is now widely regarded as one of the most important and valuable timepieces ever made. In fact, it was commissioned in 1783 by a member of the Marie-Antoinette Guards, possibly as a gift for the queen, and it took almost twenty years to complete—work stopped for around seven years (1789–1795) during the period of Breguet's exile—and it was not finished until around 1802. Even by the standards of the day, it was an astronomically expensive piece; the commission specifically called for every watch function and complication known at that time and the use of the most valuable materials (including gold, platinum, rubies and sapphires), with no limit placed on time or cost. Breguet company records indicate that the factory costs eventually came to the colossal sum of 30,000 francs – more than six times the cost of Breguet's other major work, (No. 92), which was sold to the Duc De Preslin for 4800 francs. The "Marie Antoinette" remained in the possession of the Breguet company until it was sold to Sir Spencer Brunton in 1887, eventually finding its way into the collection of Breguet expert David Lionel Goldsmid-Stern-Salomons in the 1920s.

Breguet's most remarkable piece anticipated the wristwatch by a century; he designed this, together with his friend John Arnold, for Caroline Bonaparte, Queen of Naples, in 1810. Many honours recognised his enormous contribution to horology. Each watch from his workshops demonstrated the latest horological improvements in an original movement, mostly fitted with lever or ruby-cylinder escapements that he perfected. Breguet took refuge in Switzerland from the excesses of the French Revolution. He returned to Paris overflowing with the ideas that produced the Breguet balance-spring, his first carriage clock (sold to House of Bonaparte), the sympathique clock and its dependent watch, the tact watch, and finally the tourbillon, patented in 1801.

Although Breguet is probably best known for his luxury watches and carriage clocks, he also made a number of important scientific clocks. In 1818 Lieutenant-General Thomas Brisbane, a keen amateur astronomer, purchased a Breguet mean-time regulator clock (No. 3180, 1815–1820). It is thought that Breguet originally made the clock for the French Commission of Longitude, but sold it to Brisbane for use in his observatory at Largs in Scotland. It cost Brisbane the considerable sum of 2,500 francs, and the fact he chose to buy French rather British, even in the nationalistic political climate of the early nineteenth century, gives some idea of how well regarded Breguet was internationally. Brisbane brought the clock to Australia in 1821 and it was installed in Australia's first astronomical observatory at Parramatta. The New South Wales government purchased the clock from Brisbane when he returned to England in 1825 and it remained in use there until the Parramatta observatory closed in 1847. It was put into storage for a decade before being reinstalled in the new government observatory at The Rocks, and was one of the few instruments that the new Government Astronomer, Rev. W. Scott, felt was good enough to use in the new observatory. It remained in use there for another 70 years, until it was replaced in 1912. The clock is now part of the collection of the Powerhouse Museum in Sydney.

== The Salomons Collection ==
British philanthropist, scientist and MP Sir David Lionel Goldsmid-Stern-Salomons (1851–1925) developed a lifelong passion for horology and he became one of the leading authorities on Breguet and his timepieces. In 1921 he published the seminal volume, Breguet 1747–1823, the first major book on the subject, which included a biography, an analysis of Breguet's key inventions, listings of major pieces, and a detailed timeline of production, using examples from his own unique collection for illustrations.

Over his lifetime, Salomons amassed the world's largest private Breguet collection, which ultimately grew to 124 pieces, including what are considered to be the two greatest examples of Breguet's watchmaking work – the "Marie Antionette" and the double-faced "Duc de Praslin" watches. In 1924 Salomons donated the "Duc de Praslin" (pictured at left) to the Musée des Techniques du Conservatoire National des Arts et Métiers in Paris, but it was subsequently stolen. Fortunately, after three months of tinkering with the watch, the thief was apprehended when he took it to a renowned Parisian watch specialist for repair.

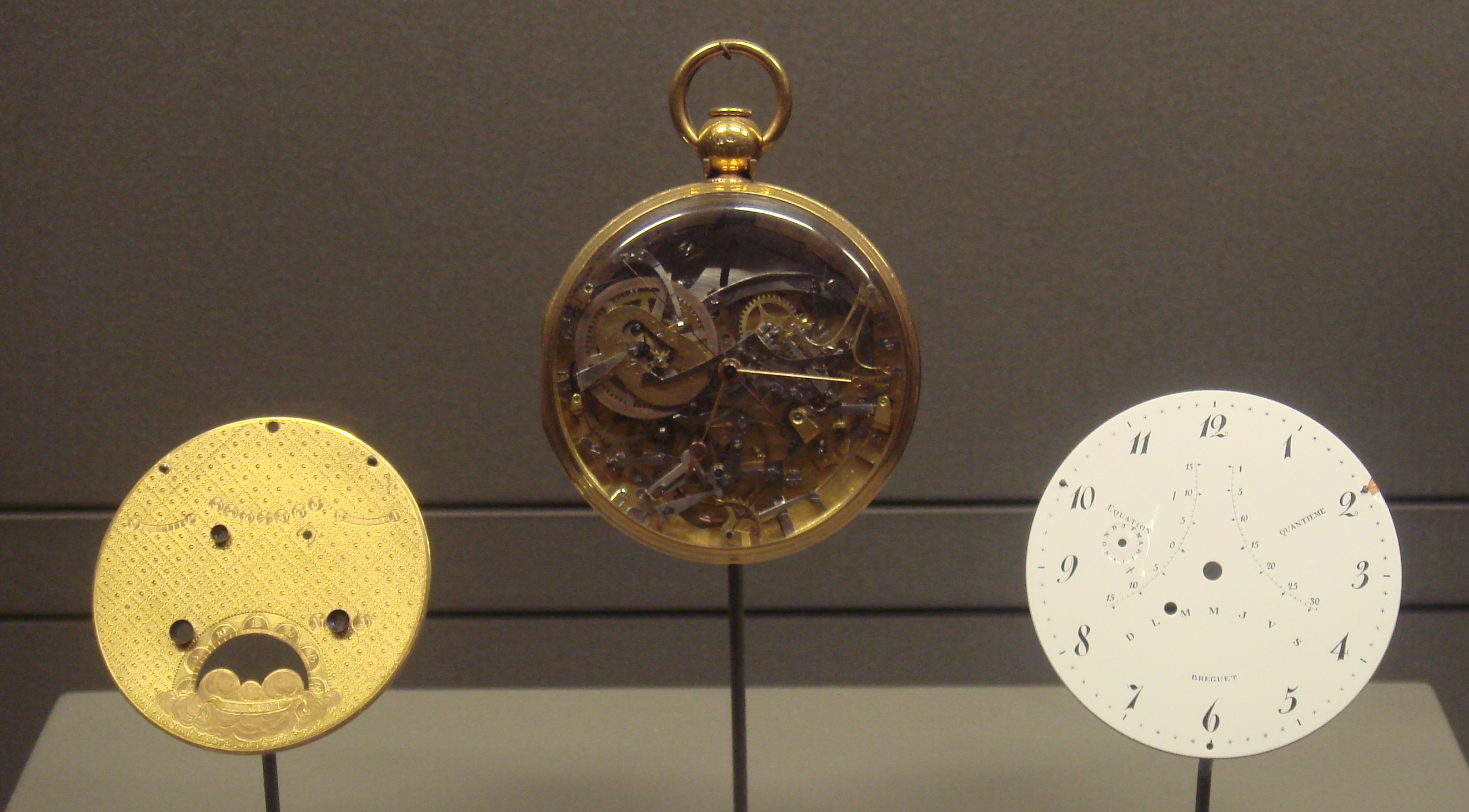
Breguet watch No. 92 (1785), bought by the Duc de Choiseul-Praslin. Musée des Arts et Métiers.

After Salomons' death in 1925, his daughter Vera donated 57 of his best Breguet pieces, including the "Marie Antoinette" and a "Sympathiques" clock to the L.A. Mayer Institute for Islamic Art in Jerusalem, which was founded by her brother. Salomons left the remainder of the collection to his wife, who eventually sold them at auction, although according to one account, she was initially rebuffed when she approached Sotheby's, because the staffer with whom she dealt could not believe that someone "off the street" could possibly have amassed such a collection. In 1980, British master horologist George Daniels catalogued the Breguet watches and clocks in the museum and published a study on them.

Three years later, on the night of 15 April 1983, the Mayer Institute was burgled and 106 rare timepieces, including the entire Salomons collection, were stolen. The audacious multimillion-dollar theft was Israel's largest-ever robbery – by this time, the "Marie Antoinette" alone was valued at US$30 million. There was a substantial insurance payout, but the case remained unsolved until August 2006, when the perpetrator was revealed as Namaan Diller, a notorious Israeli burglar who had fled to the US after the break-in.

Just before he died in 2004, Diller had confessed his crime to his wife, Nili Shamrat, and in August 2006 she attempted to sell a batch of the stolen items (including the "Marie Antoinette" watch and a Breguet "Sympathique" clock) back to the museum, although her initial asking price of $2 million was eventually cut down to just US$35,000. When police searched the couple's Los Angeles home, more of the missing items were found, and documents recovered led them to safes and storage units in France, the Netherlands and Israel; by 2008 all but ten of the items Diller stole from the Mayer Museum had been recovered.

== 2011 montre à tact discovery ==
In 2011 a member of the public brought in a pocket watch to be assessed by the experts of the BBC TV series Antiques Roadshow at Blair Castle in Perthshire, Scotland. Roadshow expert Richard Price stated that the timepiece was an early Breguet montre à tact ("tactile watch"), dating from 1801.

The watch was enclosed on both sides by discs covered with a blue translucent enamel over a Guilloché base machined in a chevron pattern. The front face was fitted with a single arrow-shaped hand in silver, encrusted with small diamonds, and the case was surrounded by twelve large diamonds enclosed by a wavy gold band, which was faced with lighter blue enamel. The enamelled back hinged open to reveal a gold cover plate and a smaller two-handed watch face. The mechanism cover bore the engraved signature of Breguet and also bore the mark of Recordon, his London agent at the time (suggesting that it was originally made for an English client). The gold cover plate protected the mechanism, which bore another signature by Breguet, and the watch number.

Price then revealed that a similar watch, in much worse condition and with all the gems stripped from it, had recently sold for over UK£20,000. He declared the newly discovered Breguet to be the greatest watch he had ever seen in his 28 years with the programme, and assessed its value as at least UK£50,000, although it may be worth considerably more – another example sold for US$288,000, while a montre à tact of very similar design, commissioned by Napoleon's wife Joséphine de Beauharnais for her sister Hortense, was sold by Christie's in Geneva for US$1.3 million in 2007.

Breguet invented the montre à tact in 1799. Although these single-hand "tact" watches are sometimes called "blind man's watches", few blind people of that era could have afforded such luxury items, and these timepieces were designed for Breguet's wealthiest clients. The montre à tact (touch watch) enabled them to tell the time without removing the watch from their pocket because, in that period, it was considered highly impolite to consult one's watch during a social gathering.

The device also enabled owners to tell the time in the dark. This was done by turning the front disc clockwise until it went no further (because of the cam inside) and then feeling at which hour marker (indicated by the surrounding circle of jewels) the watch hand was positioned. In the case of the 2011 discovery, the 12 o'clock position was marked by the chain attachment. The watch was also fitted with a small internal dial with two normal hands so that the exact time could be read when the case was opened.

== Timeline of Breguet's works ==
- 1775–1780 Improved the automatic winding mechanism – his perpetual watch.
- 1783 Invented the gong for repeater watches (bells were used until then).
- 1783 Designed the apple-shaped (aiguilles à pomme) hands, known as 'Breguet' hands. These hollow, eccentric "moon" tip hands are a variant of the hands first used by Jean-Antoine Lépine, the only difference is that Lépine's hands were not eccentric. Since their invention, Breguet hands have graced watch and clock dials alike until today.
- 1787 Adopted and improved the lever escapement. Abraham-Louis Breguet used it in its definitive form from 1814 (this form is still in use).
- 1790 Invented the 'pare-chute' anti-shock device.
- 1793 Developed a small watch showing the equation of time.
- 1794 Invented a retrograde display mechanism.
- 1795 Invented the Breguet spiral (flat spiral balance spring with overcoil).
- 1795 Invented the "Sympathique" ('sympathetic') clock, a master carriage clock which rewinds and sets to time a detachable pocket watch.
- 1799 Invented the montre a tact ("tactile") watch that could be read by feel in the pocket or the dark.
- 1801 Patented the tourbillon escapement, developed circa 1795.
- 1802 Invented the echappement naturel, a double-escape wheeled chronometer escapement that needed no oil.
- 1821 Developed the "inking" chronograph, in partnership with Frédérick Louis Fatton.

Generally speaking, Abraham-Louis Breguet was distinguished by the highest attention paid to aesthetic watch design.

In 2009 the Louvre in Paris presented a major exhibition of Breguet's work, arranged chronologically, with 146 exhibits in eight sections that covered every phase of his career. Highlights included some of Breguet's most complicated watches:

- No. 45, which displays both the Gregorian and the Republican "decimal" calendars (Breguet made only three Republican calendar timepieces)
- No. 1160, the replica of the famous No. 160 "Marie-Antoinette",
- Perpétuelle self-winding watches
- multiple original tourbillons, including an unusual large-scale demonstration tourbillon later purchased by King George IV of the United Kingdom
- examples of the "pare-chute" shock-protection system, constant force escapements
- a superb Sympathique watch and clock set from the personal collection of Queen Elizabeth II.

== See also ==
- Jean-Antoine Lépine
