= Simonne Évrard =

French revolutionary (1764–1824)

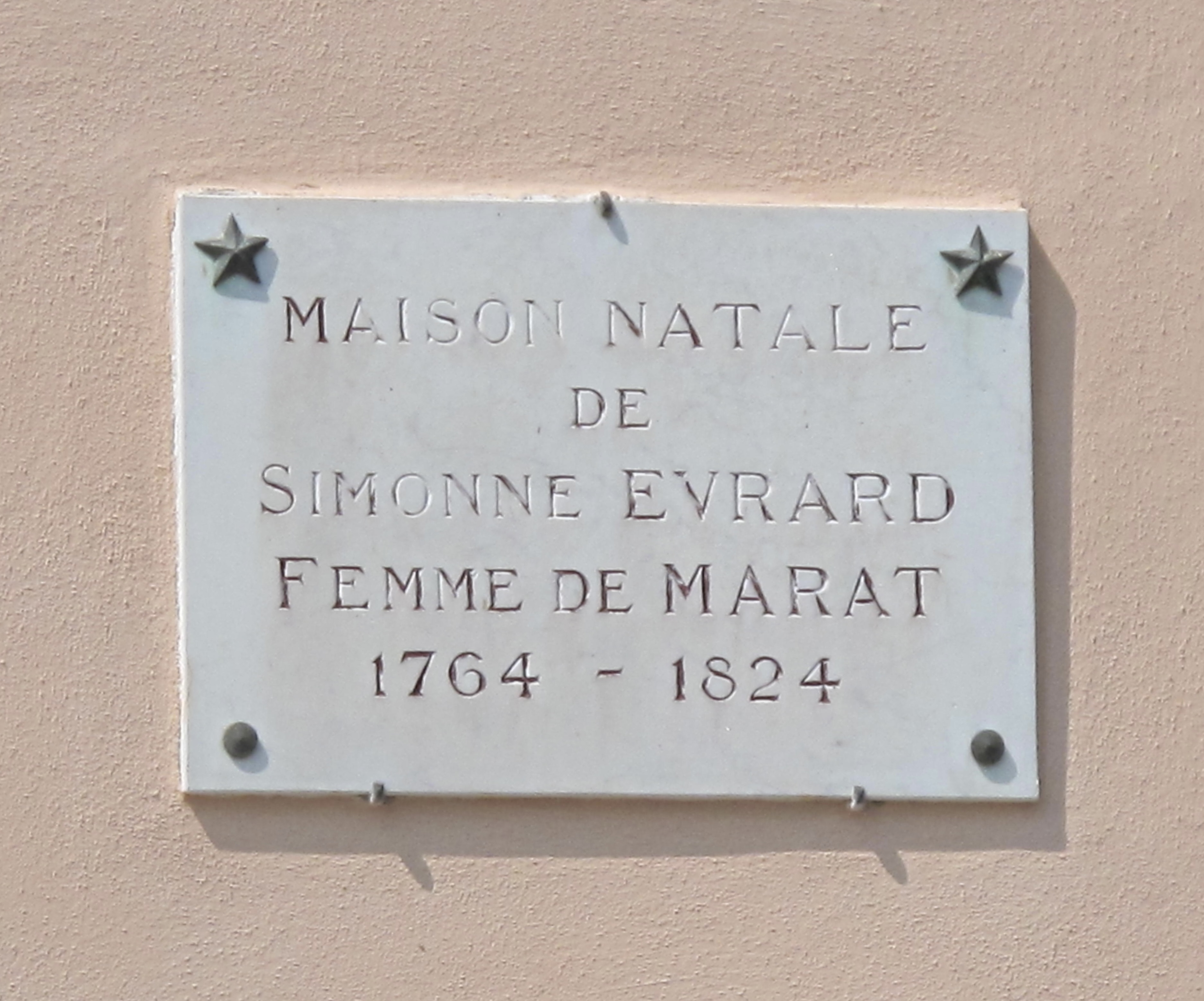
- Born: February 6, 1764; Tournus, Saône-et-Loire, France
- Died: February 24, 1824 (aged 60); Paris, France
- Other name: Widow Marat
- Occupation: Revolutionary
- Partner: Jean-Paul Marat
- Parent(s): Nicolas Évrard; Catherine Large

Simonne Évrard or Simone (6 February 1764 – 24 February 1824) was a French revolutionary and the companion of the radical journalist and politician Jean-Paul Marat. The traditional image of Évrard as a working-class seamstress may oversimplify her social background. During the French Revolution, she supported Marat financially, sheltered him while he was in hiding, and assisted with the production and distribution of his publications. After his assassination in July 1793, Évrard publicly defended his political legacy and attempted to publish his collected works.

== Biography ==
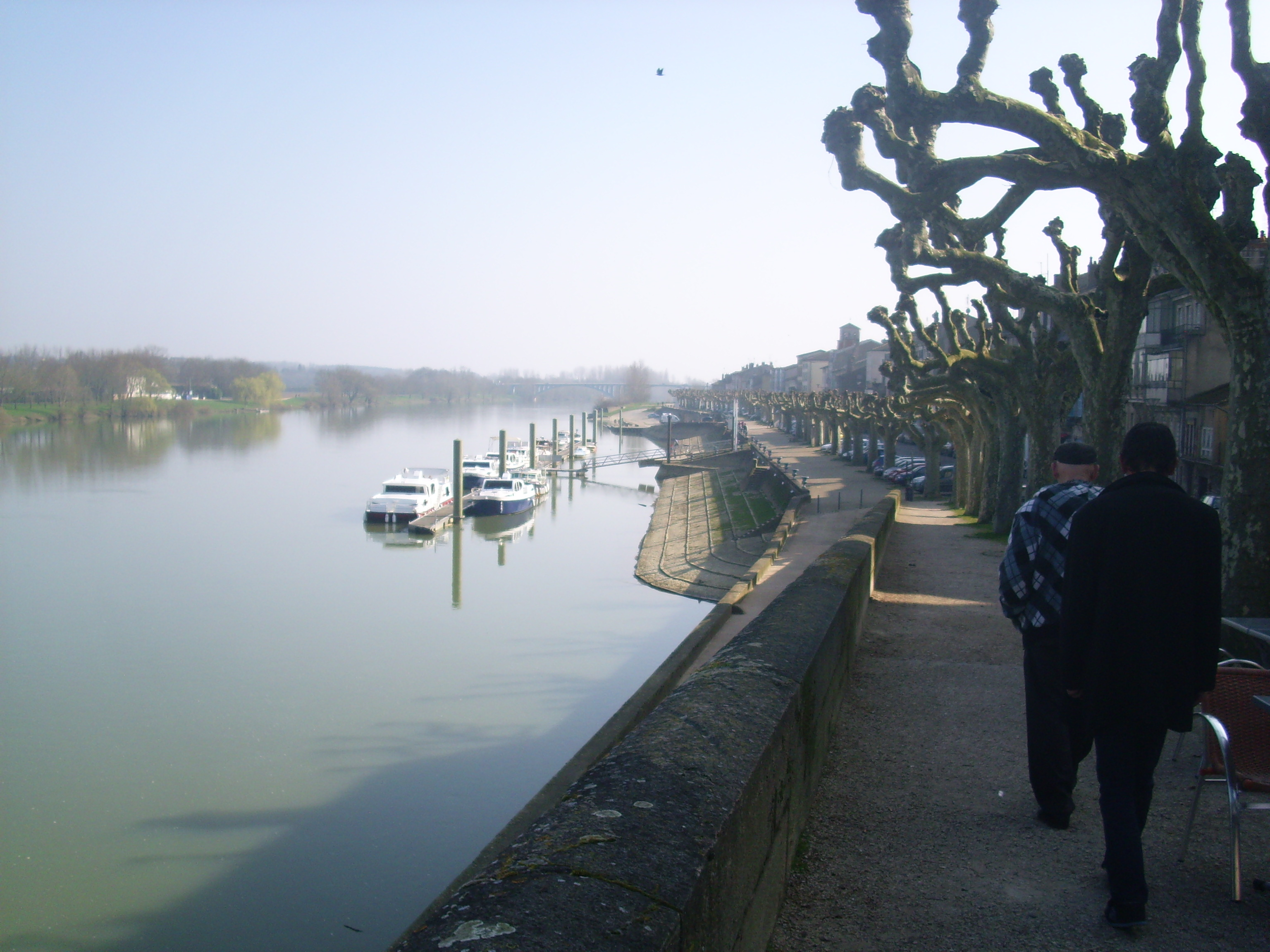
Quai de Saône à Tournus

Simonne Évrard was born on 6 February 1764 in Tournus, Burgundy, a daughter of Nicolas Évrard, a ship's carpenter on the bank of the Saône, and Catherine Large. After the death of their parents, Simonne and her younger sisters Étiennette and Catherine moved to Paris after 1776.

In Paris, the sisters worked in the clothing and lingerie trade under a woman named Piot, originally from Tournus. Around 1790, when the Évrard sisters were living on the fifth floor of 243 rue Saint-Honoré, Simonne became acquainted with Jean-Paul Marat and the two formed a close personal and political relationship. When Marat was forced into hiding, Évrard and her sisters provided him with shelter and assistance. Évrard also assisted directly with Marat's publishing activities. While he was living clandestinely, she reportedly carried manuscripts from his hiding places to printers, collected printed sheets for distribution, and acted as an intermediary for people wishing to contact him.

In a written declaration dated 1 January 1792, Marat expressed his intention to marry Évrard, describing the document as a pledge of his fidelity. The precise legal status of their union remains uncertain. Alexandre Rousselin later portrayed Évrard as both Marat's protector and his devoted companion.

The former rue des Cordeliers, showing Évrard's five-room apartment (on the second floor) on the corner, in the present-day 6th arrondissement of Paris.

After the insurrection of 10 August 1792, Évrard left the apartment in the rue Saint-Honoré and rented an apartment at 30 rue des Cordeliers in her own name, where Marat joined her. Their household also included Évrard's sister Catherine, the cook Jeannette Maréchal, and the typesetter Laurent Bas.

On 23 August 1792, Marat was allocated four printing presses from the former royal printing house, which were installed in the Cordeliers Convent. Évrard continued to care for Marat as his chronic skin disease worsened, while remaining involved in the practical work surrounding his publications.

=== Assassination ===
Hearing Marat's dying cry, Évrard rushed into the room. Laurent Bas then struck Corday with a chair and helped restrain her, while two neighbours attempted unsuccessfully to revive Marat. News of the assassination quickly drew a large crowd to the Rue des Cordeliers. Cannon were positioned at both ends of the street, and Corday was taken under heavy guard by carriage to the nearby Prison de l'Abbaye.

=== After Marat's death ===
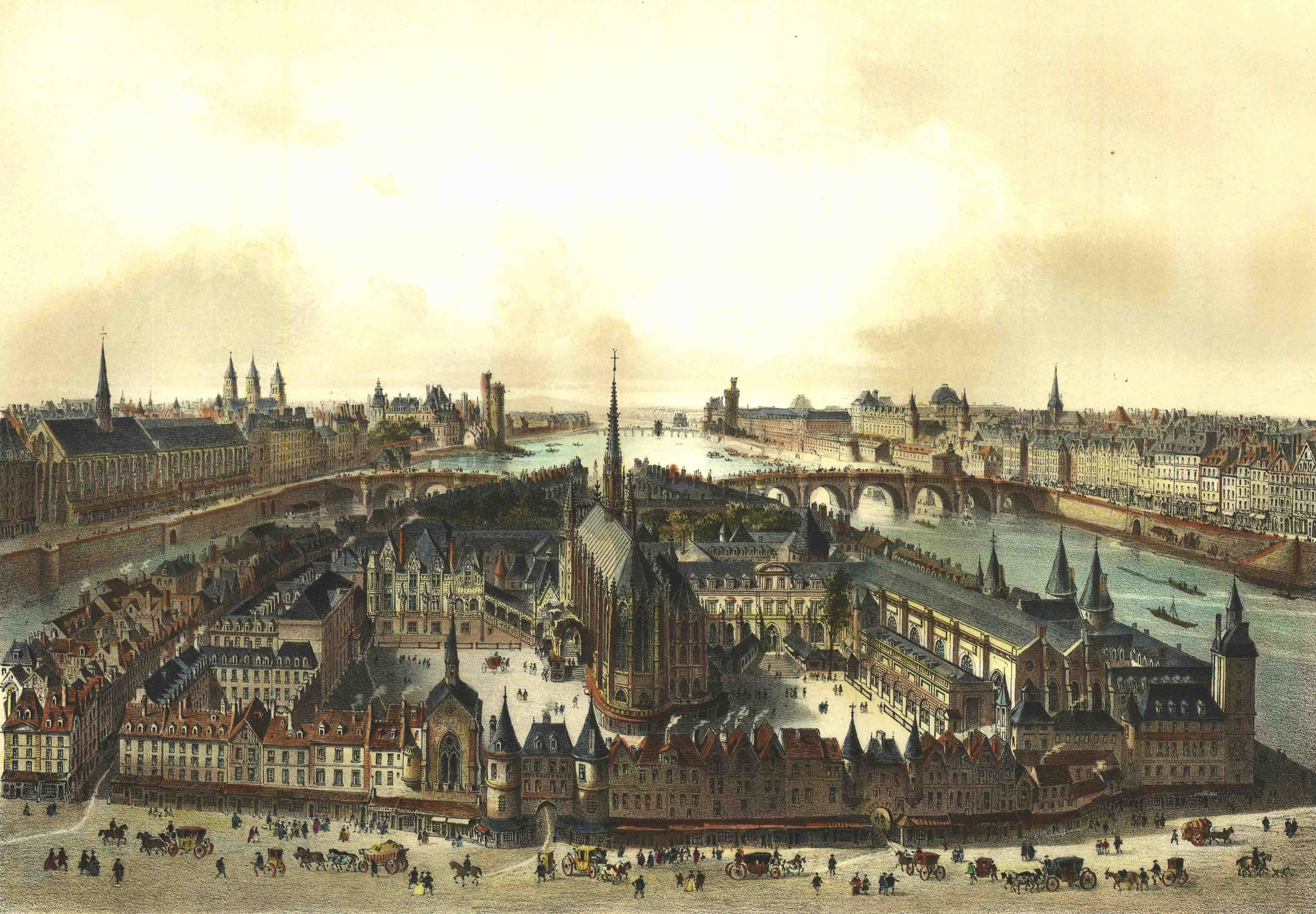
The Palais de Justice in 1850, with the former rue de la Barillerie (now fr:Boulevard du Palais), where Évrard and Albertine Marat later lived.

Rue de la Barillerie at the approach to the Pont Saint-Michel, where Simonne Évrard and Albertine Marat lived at no. 33.

After Marat was assassinated by Charlotte Corday on 13 July 1793, Évrard continued to defend his political legacy. On 8 August 1793, she appeared before the National Convention, where she denounced Jacques Roux and Théophile Leclerc for presenting themselves as continuators of Marat and for using the title L'Ami du peuple "to outrage his memory and deceive the people". At some time Simonne received a small state annuity.

At the end of the month Marat's family arrived from Geneva. In a letter dated 22 August 1793, his sisters Marie-Anne and Albertine and his brother Jean-Pierre, a watchmaker, declared that they were carrying out Marat's wishes by recognizing Évrard as their "sister". Albertine decided to stay in Paris and the two women subsequently lived together in the Rue de Marat.

Évrard also attempted to preserve and publish Marat's writings. In November 1794 she announced a new edition of his Œuvres politiques et patriotiques and issued a prospectus, but only one volume appeared. On 6 March 1795 she was required to return to the state the four printing presses that had remained at her disposal after Marat's death.

In September 1795, Évrard and Albertine Marat were arrested and imprisoned, first in Sainte-Pélagie Prison and then in the Madelonnettes women's prison. A motive wasn't explained; they were released on 16 October by order of the Committee of General Security.

Following the rue Saint-Nicaise attack of 24 December 1800, Évrard was arrested and questioned by an investigating commission on 30 December. By 1801 they were residing at rue Saint-Jacques (Latin Quarter), only a few streets away, where the skilled Albertine worked for a watchmaker. Around 1820 she made watch hands for the celebrated watchmaker Abraham-Louis Breguet, a close friend of her brother Jean-Paul.

At some time the two women moved to rue de la Barillerie on Île de la Cité, supplementing their income by making watch hands. Simonne died there on 24 February 1824, aged 60, following a fall on the stairs. Albertine continued to live at the same address until her death on 30 October 1841, aged 81. She preserved the autograph manuscript of her brother's novel Les Aventures du jeune comte Potowski, published in book form in 1848 under the title Un roman de cœur.
