= Jean-Paul Marat =

French political theorist (1743–1793)

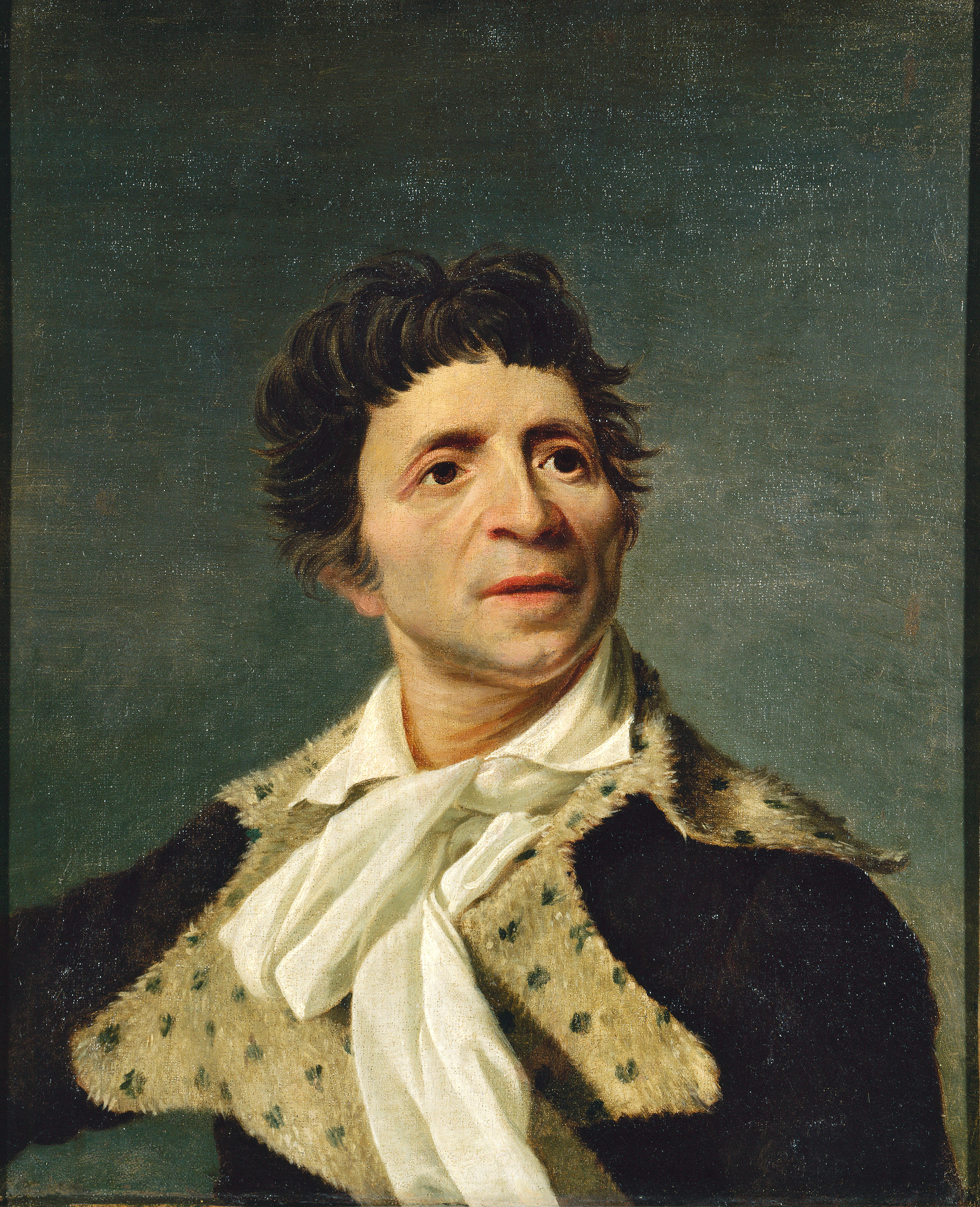
- Portrait by Joseph Boze, 1793

Member of the National Convention
- In office 9 September 1792 – 13 July 1793
- Constituency: Paris

Personal details
- Born: 24 May 1743 Boudry, Principality of Neuchâtel
- Died: 13 July 1793 (aged 50) Paris, France
- Cause of death: Assassination (stab wound)
- Party: The Mountain
- Other political affiliations: Cordeliers Club (from 1790); Jacobin Club (from 1792)
- Spouse: Simonne Évrard (m. 1792)
- Parents: Jean Mara (father); Louise Cabrol (mother)
- Education: University of St Andrews (MD)
- Occupation: Journalist, scientist

Jean-Paul Marat (UK: /ˈmærɑː/, US: /məˈrɑː/; French: [ʒɑ̃pɔl maʁa]; born Mara; 24 May 1743 – 13 July 1793) was a French scientist, physician, political theorist, journalist, and politician. Before the French Revolution, he pursued a career in medicine and science and spent more than ten years abroad. He published works on subjects including optics, electricity, political theory, and criminal law. During the Revolution he became one of its most prolific, radical and controversial journalists. Through his newspaper L'Ami du peuple (The Friend of the People), Marat responded rapidly to political events but also publicized complaints and grievances brought to him by ordinary citizens, presenting himself as their advocate against officials and others whom he accused of injustice or abuse.

Marat became closely associated with the sans-culottes and the radical politics of Paris. Unable to find printers willing to publish some of his more controversial writings, he established his own printing press and continued to publish despite repeated attempts by the authorities to suppress his newspaper, spending periods in hiding.

Marat was elected to the National Convention in September 1792 and aligned with the Montagnards in their struggle against the Girondins. His journalism became notorious for increasingly violent calls for the punishment and sometimes the pre-emptive killing of those he regarded as enemies of the Revolution. Marat repeatedly justified such violence as a means of preventing greater bloodshed. His writings and political activity have consequently remained central to debates about political violence during the Revolution, including the September Massacres.

In early June 1793, he played an active part in the conflict that culminated in the fall of the Girondins. On 13 July 1793, Marat was assassinated by Charlotte Corday, a Girondin sympathizer, while taking a bath to alleviate a debilitating skin condition.

Marat's assassination transformed his political image. Jacques-Louis David took a leading role in organizing his funeral ceremonies, while popular societies, the sections of Paris, and the Montagnards increasingly represented him as the murdered Ami du peuple and as a martyr of the Revolution. His remains were transferred to the Panthéon in September 1794, but during the Thermidorian Reaction his public cult rapidly collapsed and he was removed from the Panthéon in February 1795.

== Education and early career ==
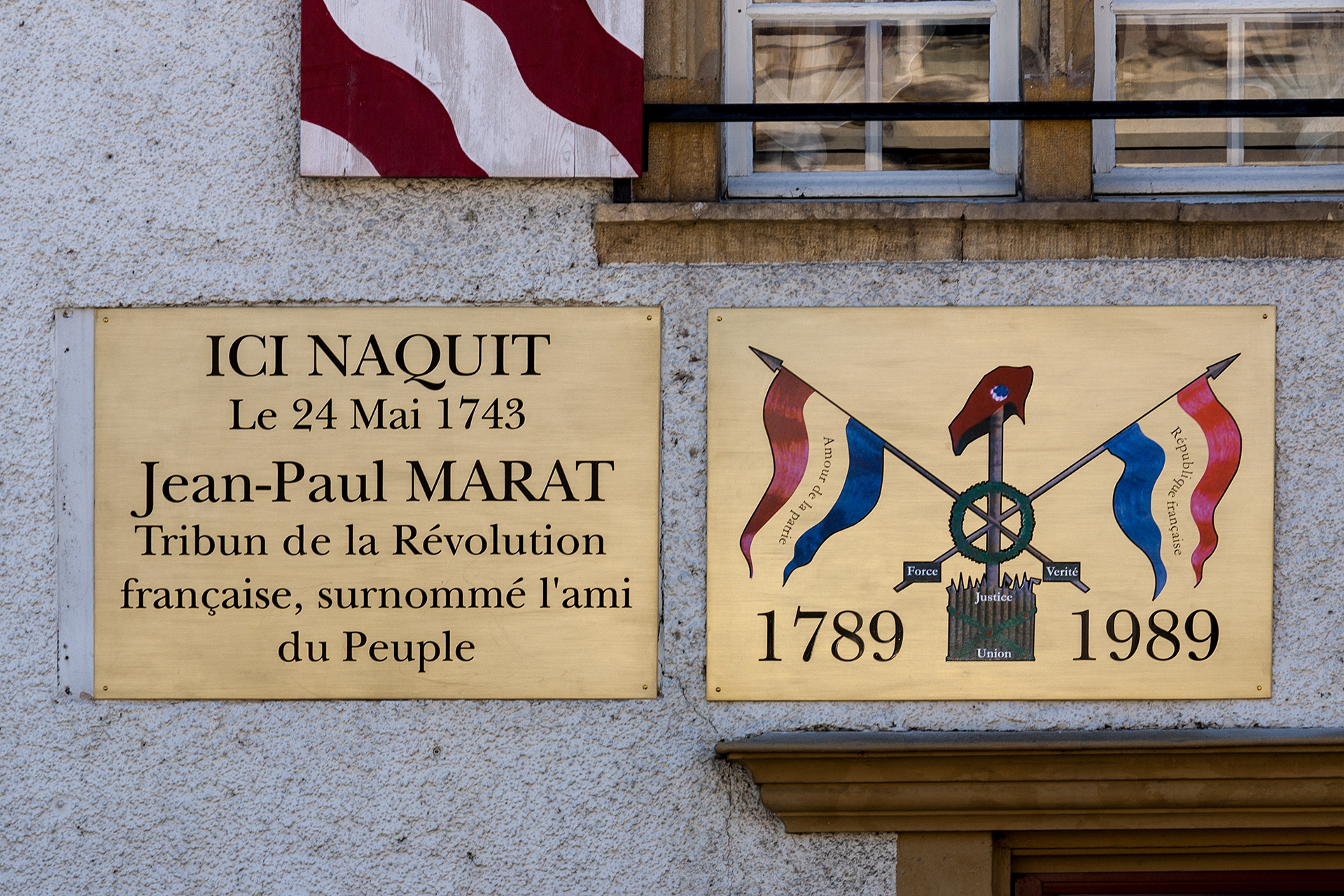
Commemorative plaque on the house traditionally identified as Marat's birthplace in Boudry

Marat was born in Boudry and baptised on 8 June. His family remained there until 1752, when they moved to Peseux. In 1754, the family, by then with six children, moved to Neuchâtel. Marat received much of his early education at home from his father, who worked as a textile designer and teacher of languages, geography and history. The family's settlement was facilitated by governor George Keith. Marat also studied under Jean-Élie Bertrand, professor of belles-lettres and later a co-founder of the Société typographique de Neuchâtel.

At the age of 17, he applied to join the expedition of Jean-Baptiste Chappe d'Auteroche to Tobolsk to observe the transit of Venus, but was turned down. Marat later portrayed intellectual ambition as a defining feature of his character. In an autobiographical account, he recalled that as a child he had successively wanted to become a schoolmaster, professor, author and, by the age of twenty, a "creative genius". He described the "love of glory" as the one passion that had remained with him throughout his life.

In 1760, Marat moved via Montpellier to Bordeaux, where he spent about two years. Later biographers associated his stay there with the wealthy Nairac family, sometimes describing him as a private tutor, but the details are uncertain. He then moved to Paris, where he continued his studies and pursued medical training without obtaining a formal qualification. He later francized his surname from "Mara" to "Marat".

In 1765, Marat moved to Soho, where he practised medicine despite lacking formal medical qualifications. In London, Marat became a close friend of the Italian painter Antonio Zucchi ; Joseph Bonomi the Elder became his patient. According to Joseph Farington's diary, Marat was a frequent guest at Zucchi's house and, being well read in classical literature, regularly suggested subjects for Zucchi's compositions. Zucchi also frequently took Marat with him when visiting Angelica Kauffman at her home in Golden Square.

Several of Marat's siblings also pursued careers abroad. His sister Albertine was a skilled maker of watch hands in Geneva and settled in Paris in September 1793. In 1784 his younger brother David settled in Saint Petersburg and later taught French at the Imperial Lyceum at Tsarskoye Selo, where Alexander Pushkin was among his pupils. His brother Jean-Pierre became a member of the Cordeliers, but returned to Geneva to become a watchmaker. His sister Marianne married Charles-Frédéric Oulevay, a specialist in preserving insects who, attempted to settle in Paris in late 1794 and unsuccessfully sought a post as an assistant naturalist.

== Political, philosophical, and medical writing ==
Around 1770, Marat wrote a sentimental and political epistolary novel, Les Aventures du jeune comte Potowski, set in Poland before the First Partition. The novel already presented resistance to oppressive government as a right of the people. The autograph manuscript, comprising about 240 pages in Marat's hand, was preserved by his sister Albertine Marat, who later sold it to the writer Aimé-Martin. It was obtained for publication by Paul Lacroix, who edited the first complete book edition in 1848.

His Chains of Slavery, published in London in 1774, examined the means by which rulers could undermine political liberty. Published during the political agitation surrounding John Wilkes and the British general election of 1774, the book attacked political corruption, restrictions on representation and the use of patronage, standing armies, censorship and other instruments of government power. In May 1774, Marat wrote to Wilkes about the work, seeking to bring it to the attention of the British opposition.

In 1774, Marat travelled to Amsterdam to arrange the publication of a French version of his philosophical work with the Geneva-born publisher Marc-Michel Rey, Rousseau's principal publisher. During his stay in the Dutch Republic he met the writer and scholar Isaac de Pinto in The Hague, who provided him with a letter of introduction to a young professor in Utrecht, though the introduction appears to have led to little. Rey published the substantially expanded work as the three-volume De l'Homme, ou des principes et des lois de l'influence de l'âme sur le corps et du corps sur l'âme in 1775–76.

Charles-Philippe de France, comte d'Artois, later King Charles X of France.

De l'Homme brought Marat into conflict with Voltaire. Marat criticized Helvétius and Voltaire in the work; Voltaire responded with a mocking critique of Marat's philosophical arguments. Marat remembered the dispute years later, claiming in 1791 that Voltaire had been angered by the treatment he received in De l'Homme.

Marat also continued to establish himself professionally as a physician. On the recommendation of two medical practitioners, he received an MD from the University of St Andrews in June 1775. He subsequently returned to London, where in November 1775 he published a medical tract on the treatment of gleet, followed by An Enquiry into the Nature, Cause, and Cure of a Singular Disease of the Eyes in January 1776. In the same year he visited his family in Geneva.

His medical reputation and the patronage of the Marquis de l'Aubespine, whose wife was among his patients, led to his appointment in June 1777 as physician to the bodyguard of the Comte d'Artois, the youngest brother of Louis XVI. The post paid 2,000 livres a year plus allowances.

== Scientific writing ==
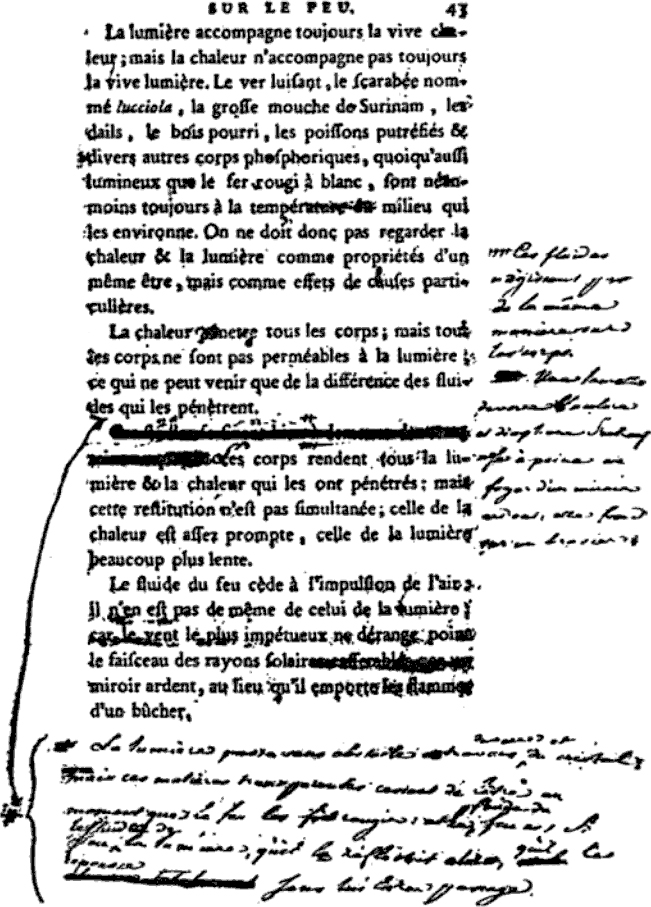
A proof page of Marat's Recherches physiques sur le Feu, corrected and annotated in his hand.

While serving as a physician among the aristocracy, Marat devoted increasing attention to experimental science. In 1779, he published Découvertes de M. Marat sur le feu, l'électricité et la lumière (Mr Marat's Discoveries on Fire, Electricity and Light), a summary of his experiments and conclusions in these fields. He subsequently published more extensive works on fire, light and electricity.

=== Recherches Physiques sur le Feu ===
Marat's first major publication based on his experiments was Recherches Physiques sur le Feu (English: Research into the Physics of Fire), published in 1780 with the approval of the official censors.

The work described 166 experiments intended to show that fire was not a material element, as was widely held, but an "igneous fluid". At Marat's request, the Academy of Sciences appointed a commission to assess the work. Its report of April 1779 did not endorse his conclusions, but praised his "new, precise and well-executed experiments, appropriately and ingeniously designed". Marat nevertheless presented the report as approval of his work, prompting Antoine Lavoisier to demand a public correction from the academy. The resulting dispute contributed to Marat's increasingly strained relations with leading Academy members, including Lavoisier, Condorcet and Laplace. Lamarck and Lacépède, however, wrote favourably about his experiments and conclusions.

=== Découvertes sur la Lumière ===
Marat's second major scientific work, Découvertes sur la Lumière (Discoveries on Light), challenged aspects of Newton's theory of light and colour, then widely regarded as authoritative.

Marat studied the bending of light around objects and argued that the colours observed when sunlight passed through an aperture and a prism originated through diffraction at the edges of the aperture rather than through refraction in the prism, as Newton maintained. He also argued for three primary colours, rather than Newton's seven.

At Marat's request, the Academy of Sciences appointed a commission to assess the work. From June 1779 to January 1780, he repeated his experiments before its members. The commission's report, drafted by Jean-Baptiste Le Roy and issued in May 1780, concluded that although the experiments were numerous, "they do not appear to us to prove what the author believes they establish". The academy therefore declined to endorse Marat's conclusions. According to Cussen, Marat came to see the rejection as evidence of an academic cabal determined to defend Newtonian orthodoxy.

=== Scientific work in the 1780s ===
Benjamin Franklin corresponded with Marat and attended some of his experiments. In 1779, Marat repeatedly invited Franklin to demonstrations at the residence of the Marquis de l'Aubespine. Brissot later recalled hearing Franklin praise Marat's skill as an experimenter, and wrote that Franklin had been particularly impressed by his experiments on light.

In April 1783, Marat resigned his court appointment to concentrate on scientific research. He published works on the medical use of electricity (Mémoire sur l'électricité médicale, 1783) and optics (Notions élémentaires d'optique, 1784), followed by a translation of Newton's Opticks (1787) and Mémoires académiques, ou nouvelles découvertes sur la lumière (1788), a collection of essays on his experimental findings.

Marat also wrote about the emerging science of ballooning. After Jean-François Pilâtre de Rozier and Pierre Romain died attempting to cross the English Channel in June 1785, he published Lettres de l'observateur Bon-Sens [...] sur la fatale catastrophe des infortunés Pilatre de Rosier & Romain, examining the physical causes of the accident. In Les Charlatans modernes (1791), based on material written earlier, he attacked academic patronage and government rewards and criticized prominent scientists and balloonists, including Pilâtre de Rozier.

== Other pre-Revolutionary writing ==
View on Neuchâtel

Marat's Plan de législation criminelle originated as an entry for a competition on the reform of criminal law organized by the Economic Society of Bern in 1777. The work was first published at Neuchâtel in 1780; according to Friedrich Lohmann, the first edition was probably confiscated by the censorship authorities. Marat's ideas on criminal law were influenced by Jean-Jacques Rousseau and Cesare Beccaria, author of Dei delitti e delle pene.

Around this time Marat developed a close friendship with Jacques Pierre Brissot, who was himself writing on criminal-law reform. Their surviving correspondence shows that they were on intimate terms. In 1782, Brissot published Marat's complete Plan de législation criminelle in the fifth volume of his Bibliothèque philosophique du législateur. Brissot later recalled that Marat had asked him to include the work, but had declined to have his name printed because he feared imprisonment in the Bastille.

In July 1790, Marat announced a new edition of the Plan, arguing that its proposals could contribute to the National Assembly's forthcoming work on criminal legislation. The Plan combined penal reform with a broader criticism of social and political institutions. Marat argued that bad government, unjust laws and social inequality could themselves contribute to crime, and that society could expect the poor to obey its laws only if it guaranteed them the means of subsistence, clothing, protection, and care in sickness and old age. He regarded the king as no more than the "first magistrate" of the nation, and argued that punishments should be proportionate to the offence and that capital punishment should be used only rarely, although he retained it for premeditated murder. He also proposed that each town should have an avocat des pauvres and independent criminal tribunals with twelve-member juries to ensure a fair trial.

== In the early French Revolution ==
=== Estates General and Fall of the Bastille ===
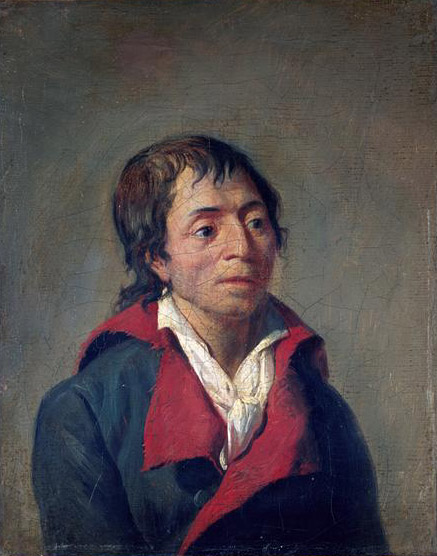
Marat by Jean-François Garneray

At the end of 1788, Marat became seriously ill and, believing that he might die, appointed the Neuchâtel-born watchmaker Abraham-Louis Breguet as executor of his will, entrusting him with his handwritten will and optical instruments. Marat later recalled that news of the convocation of the Estates General revived his spirits. He strongly desired to contribute his ideas to the coming events and subsequently abandoned his career as a scientist and doctor, taking up his pen on behalf of the Third Estate.

Marat anonymously published his first contribution to the revolution in February 1789, titled Offrande à la Patrie (Offering to the Nation), which touched on some of the same points as the Abbé Sieyès' famous "Qu'est-ce que le Tiers État?" ("What is the Third Estate?"). Marat claimed that this work caused a sensation throughout France, though he likely exaggerated its effect as the pamphlet mostly echoed ideas similar to many other pamphlets and cahiers circulating at the time. This was followed by a "Supplément de l'Offrande" in March, where he was less optimistic, expressing displeasure with the King's Lettres Royales of 24 January. In August 1789, he published La Constitution, ou Projet de déclaration des droits de l'homme et du citoyen, intended to influence the drafting of France's new constitution, then being debated in the National Assembly. In this work, he builds his theories upon ideas taken from Montesquieu and Rousseau, claiming that the sovereignty of the nation rests with the people and emphasizing the need for a separation of powers. He argues for a constitutional monarchy, believing that a republic is ineffective in large nations. Marat's work elicited no response from the National Assembly.

Marat subsequently gave an account of the incident to Brissot, who published an edited version in the Patriote français on 7 September 1789.

=== L'Ami du peuple ===
Title page of Nouvelle dénonciation contre Necker (1790)

On 12 September 1789, Marat began his own newspaper, entitled Publiciste parisien, before changing its name four days later to L'Ami du peuple ("The People's Friend"). He frequently attacked influential individuals and institutions as conspirators against the Revolution, including the Commune, the Constituent Assembly, ministers, and the Châtelet. In January 1790, the district of the Cordeliers resisted an attempt by the police to arrest him. Marat left Paris for London in February, returning in May. While in England he was in contact with his friend Abraham-Louis Breguet, a fellow native of the principality of Neuchâtel. Marat appears to have entrusted some of his personal valuables, including a watch and an optical instrument, to him.

In a letter to Breguet dated 20 May 1790, Marat complained that three counterfeiters were publishing spurious versions of L'Ami du peuple. Publication of the genuine newspaper resumed that month. The following month he briefly published a second newspaper, Le Junius français, named after the English polemicist Junius. Marat appealed to the police, who suppressed the fraudulent issues.

Marat used the newspaper as a means of continuous political intervention, commenting on decisions by the Assembly and the Paris authorities and scrutinizing the conduct of ministers, politicians and other public figures. Recurring subjects included popular sovereignty, the conduct of public officials, war and counter-revolution, social inequality, the assignats and financial speculation. His denunciations frequently identified individuals by name and were accompanied by warnings of conspiracy and calls for popular action, at times including political violence.

Marat repeatedly increased his estimates of the number of enemies whose elimination he considered necessary to save the Revolution. In July 1790 he wrote that five or six hundred "heads" would have sufficed; by early 1791 he was speaking of 100,000, and later of still larger numbers.

Publication reached an extraordinary intensity in 1791, when about 500 issues appeared. L'Ami du peuple continued until 21 September 1792 (French First Republic), ending with no. 685; it was succeeded by Marat's Journal de la République française.

Following the Champ de Mars massacre of 17 July 1791, when the National Guard under Lafayette fired on demonstrators after Mayor Bailly had proclaimed martial law, a crackdown on the radical press followed. Copies of Marat's newspaper were seized and the printing formes were broken up. In a later letter, Marat gave detailed instructions for the composition of a political caricature attacking Bailly and Lafayette. On 14 September 1791, Marat left Paris intending to travel to England. While travelling through northern France, he continued to write L’Ami du peuple. In Amiens he believed he had been recognized and abandoned the journey. By 27 September he was returning to Paris.

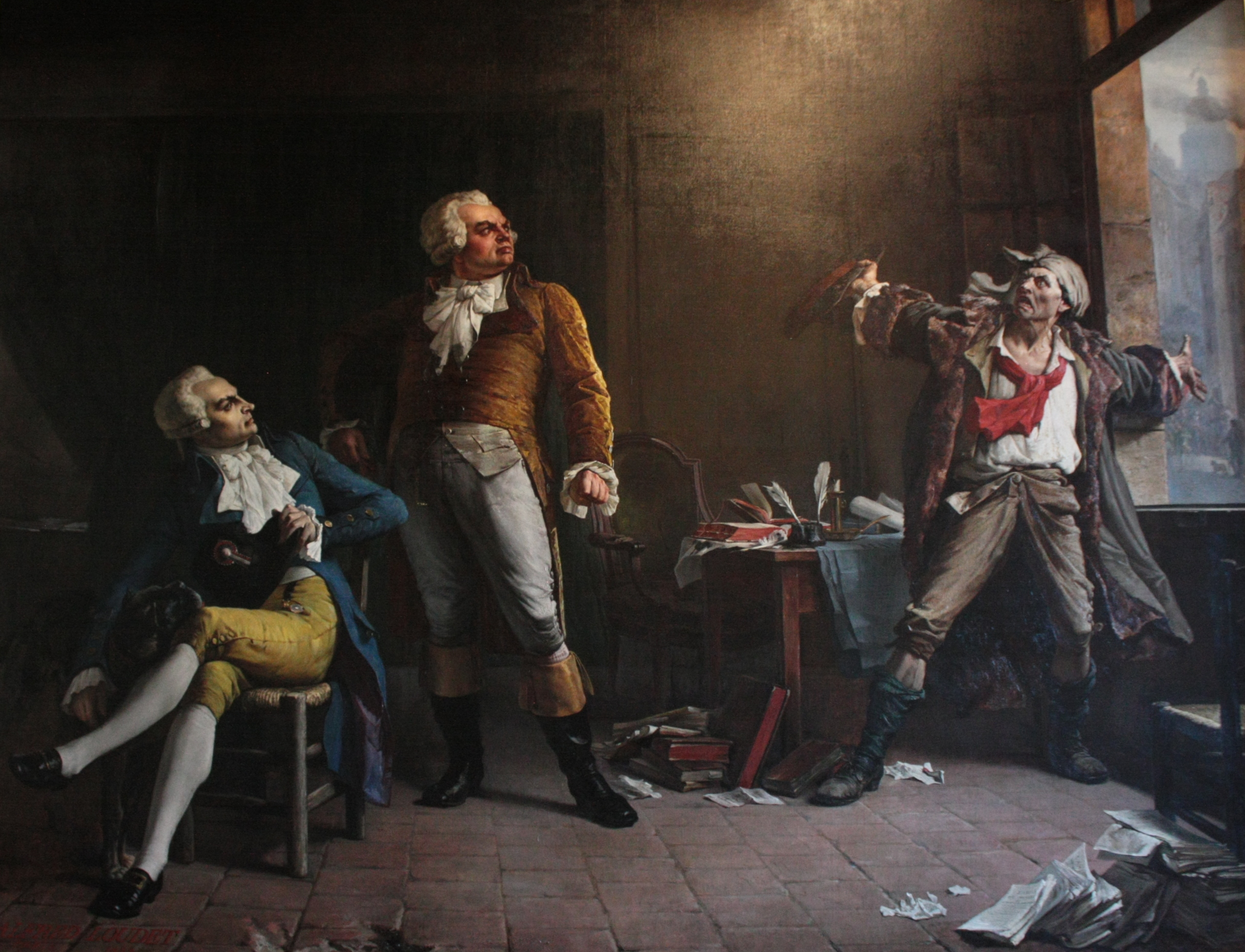
Imaginary meeting between Robespierre, Danton and Marat (right), depicted by Alfred Loudet in 1882, inspired by Victor Hugo's novel Ninety-Three (1874).

On 3 May 1792, in issue 648 of L'Ami du peuple, Marat described his meeting with Robespierre, recalling Robespierre's criticism of his violent rhetoric. Although he praised Robespierre's integrity and patriotism, Marat concluded that he lacked "the vision and audacity of a statesman". On the same day, the Legislative Assembly issued a decree of accusation against Marat over issue 645 of L'Ami du peuple, ordering the executive authorities to enforce the decree and seal his belongings and papers. Marat found refuge for six days with Jacques Roux, a constitutional priest living in the Section des Gravilliers.

Meanwhile, Marat's former friendship with Jacques Pierre Brissot had turned into bitter political hostility. In June 1792, Marat published Traits destinés au portrait du jésuite Brissot, attacking his former friend over his earlier activities and political connections. Robert Darnton, examining Marat's accusations in the light of Brissot's correspondence, notes that Marat drew on information that only someone close to Brissot was likely to have known.

After the Council of Ministers proposed his arrest on 7 August 1792, Marat went into hiding, taking refuge in the cellars of the Cordeliers Convent. Shortly after the insurrection of 10 August, Simonne Évrard rented an apartment at 30 Rue des Cordeliers in her own name, and Marat subsequently moved in with her. The household also included her sister Catherine, Jeannette Maréchal, their cook, and Laurent Bas, who helped with Marat's printing and publishing work. On 23 August 1792, he was allocated four presses from the former royal printing house, which were installed in the Convent cellars. The next issue of L'Ami du peuple did not appear until 15 September.

== Committee on Surveillance ==
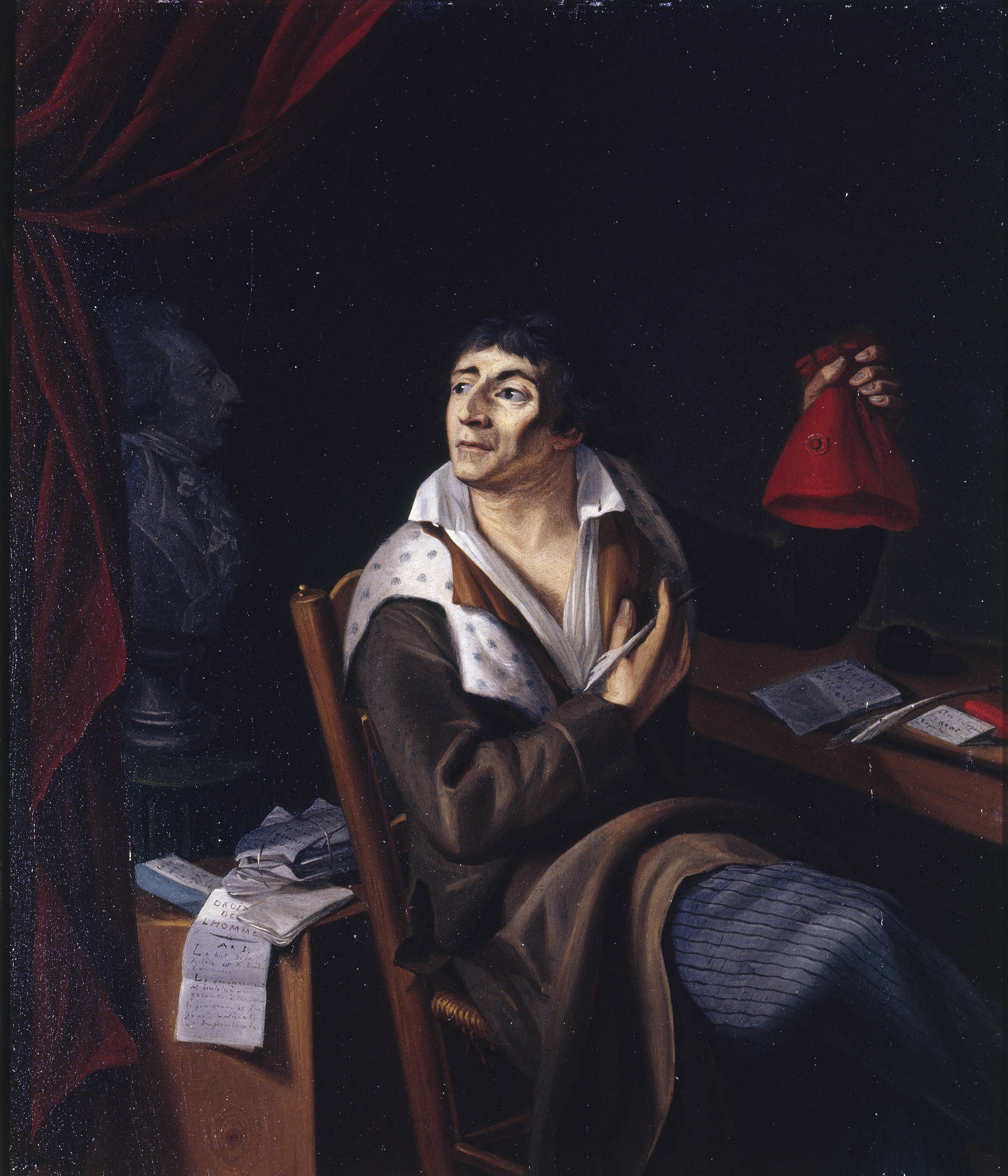
Anonymous portrait of Marat, c. 1793 (Musée Carnavalet)

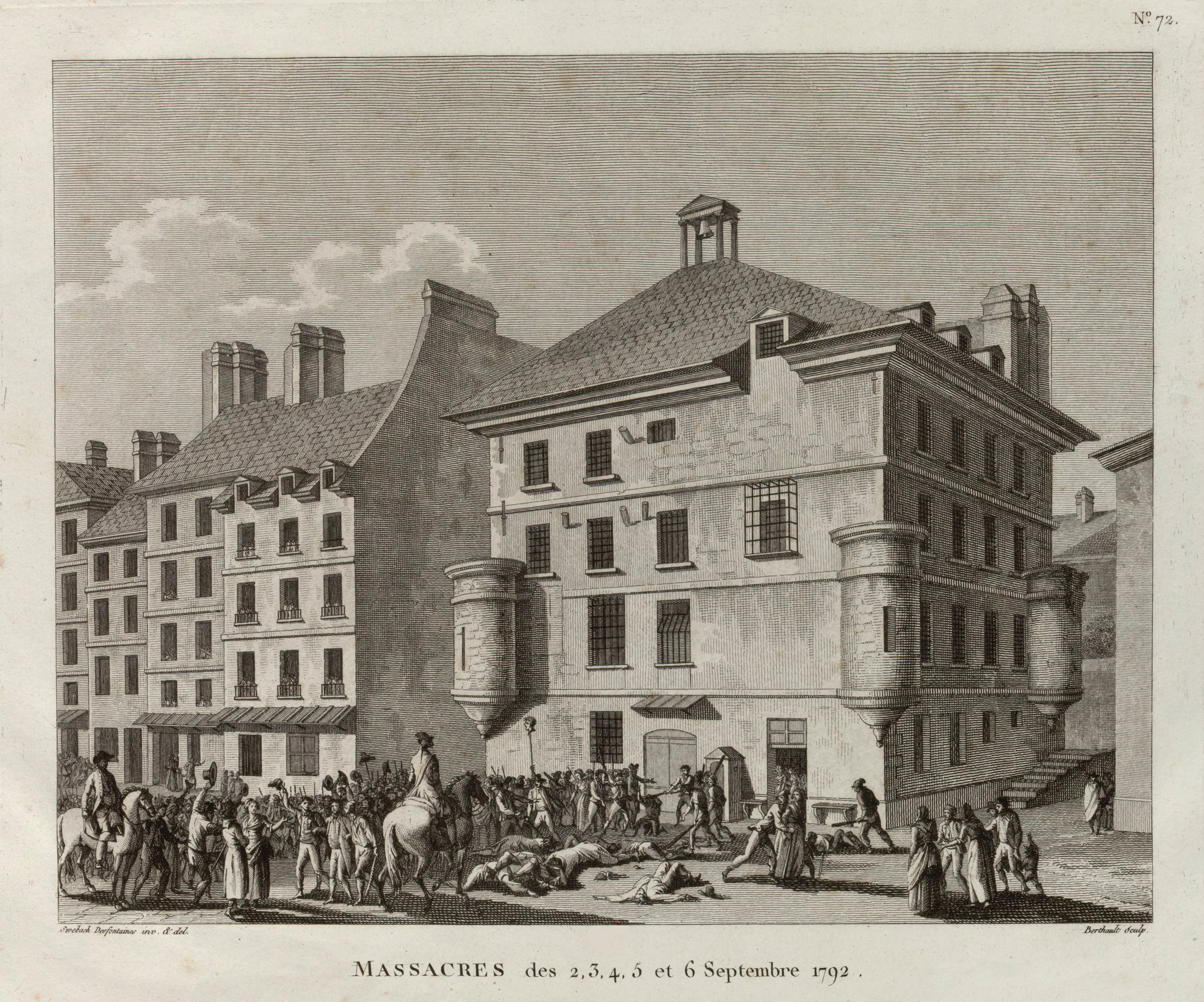
Massacres des 2, 3, 4, 5 et 6 septembre 1792

After the insurrection of 10 August, the insurrectionary Paris Commune established a Committee of Surveillance, whose membership changed several times during the following weeks. Marat was not among its first members. On 19 August, in no. 680 of L'Ami du peuple, Marat called on the people to go armed to the Abbaye Prison, seize alleged traitors, particularly the imprisoned Swiss officers and their accomplices, and "put them to the sword". On 23 August, the General Council of the Commune charged Marat with publishing its decrees and proceedings; Cassagnac also states that he had a desk in the Commune's meeting hall.

On 2 September, the committee's four administrators—Panis, Sergent, Pierre-Jacques Duplain and Didier Jourdeuil—appointed six administrateurs-adjoints, including Marat, Deforgues, Lenfant, Guermeur, Leclerc and Duffort. The adjuncts were given signing authority under the supervision of the four administrators, who retained responsibility for the committee.

In the afternoon of the 2nd the September Massacres began. During the killings at the Abbaye, an order signed by Panis and Sergent instructed that all the prisoners there be judged, with one specified exception. During the night of 2–3 September, they also ordered the removal and burial of the bodies and the cleaning of the prison.

On 3 September, the Committee of Surveillance sent a circular to the departments describing the killings in Paris as "acts of justice", arguing that terror had been necessary to restrain traitors, and urging its recipients to have the circular printed and forwarded. Marat was among its signatories, and the drafting of the circular has been attributed to him.

In October, in no. 12 of his Journal de la République française, Marat rejected accusations that the Committee of Surveillance had organized the September Massacres. He attributed the violence to the failure of the courts to punish counter-revolutionaries and defended the killings as an unfortunate necessity, while claiming that he and Panis had sought to protect debtors and minor offenders from the violence.

== National Convention ==
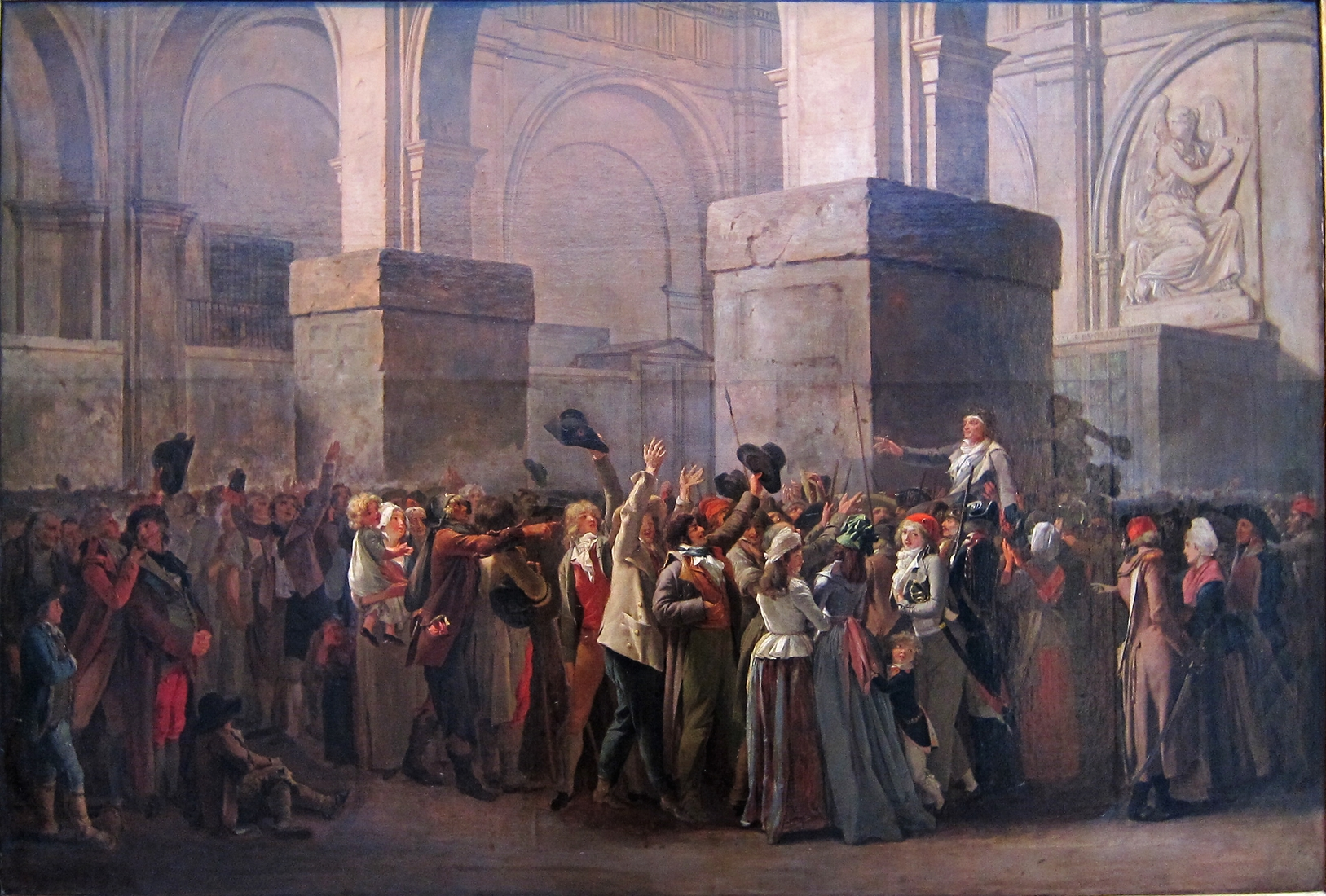
The Triumph of Marat by Louis-Léopold Boilly, 1794

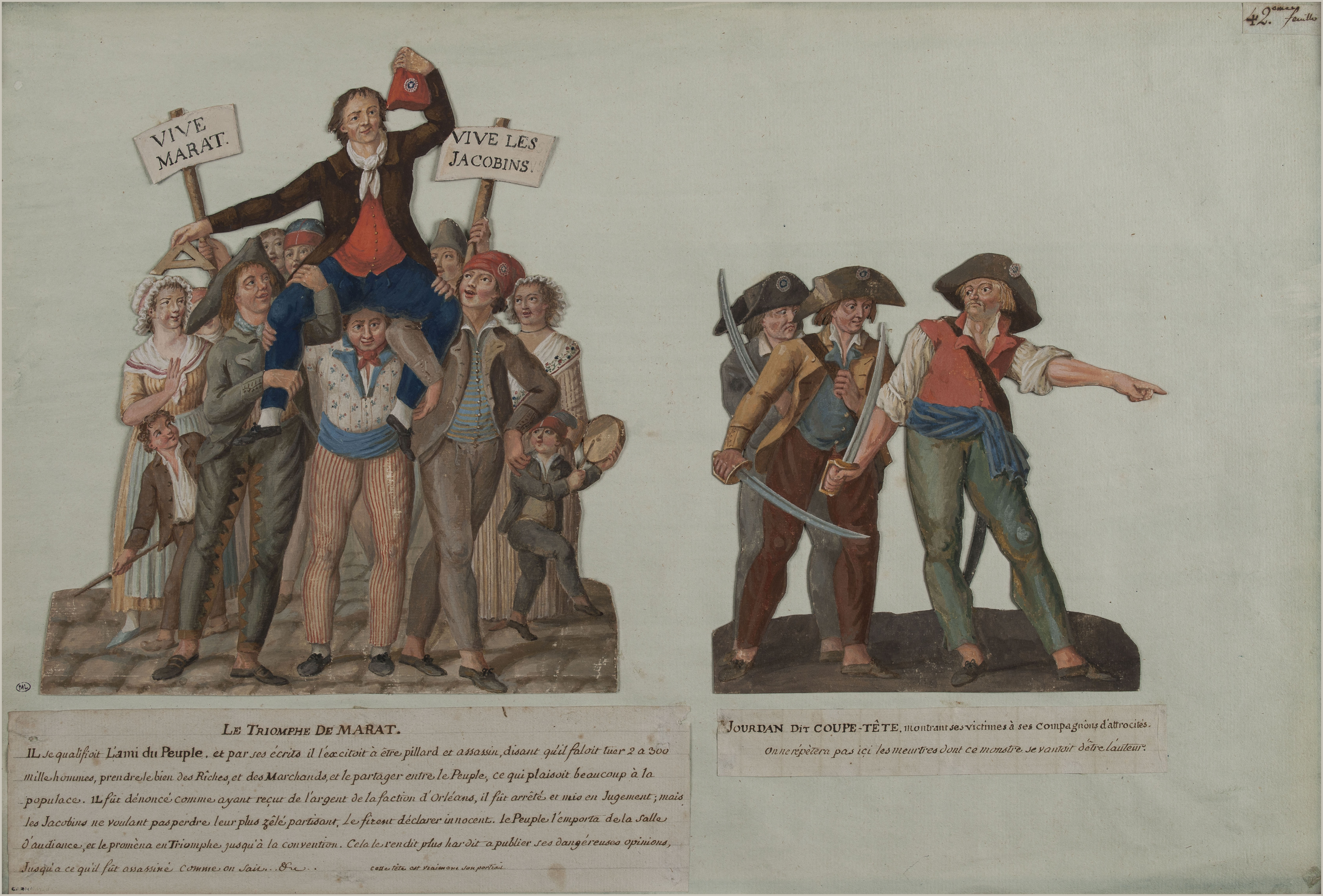
Le triomphe de Marat, 24 avril 1793.

Marat was elected to the National Convention in September 1792 as one of the 24 deputies representing Paris. Although the Jacobins and their allies dominated the Paris delegation, the Montagnards initially formed a minority in the convention.

Following his election and the establishment of the French First Republic, Marat ended publication of L'Ami du peuple with issue no. 685 on 21 September 1792. Four days later, he launched its successor, Journal de la République française, identifying himself on the masthead as a deputy to the convention. In his new journal, Marat repeatedly criticized General Dumouriez, particularly his political conduct in the Austrian Netherlands, which he associated with the ambitions of the House of Orléans.

At the same time, Marat's violent political rhetoric was drawing increasing criticism. His writings were attacked in the convention, while in December members of the Jacobin Club debated whether his more extreme statements should be taken literally. After the execution of Louis XVI, Marat's conflict with the Girondins intensified. During the food crisis in February, Marat denounced hoarders and speculators but opposed demands from the Paris sections for price controls. After food riots broke out in Paris on 25 February, the Girondins accused Marat of having encouraged the violence.

On 10 March, the convention established the Revolutionary Tribunal to try counter-revolutionary offences. The political crisis deepened in early April when Dumouriez, after attempting to turn his army against the convention, defected to the Austrians. As president of the Jacobins, Marat had signed a circular on 5 April calling on the departments to defend Paris against a "sacrilegious cabal" within the convention. The Girondins used the circular to demand his prosecution, and on 13 April the convention voted to indict him. Marat initially remained out of sight, but surrendered himself to the authorities on 23 April. On 24 April, he became the first representative of the people to be brought before the recently established Revolutionary Tribunal. Marat defended himself without counsel, and the jury acquitted him, finding that his writings expressed a "just indignation". He was acclaimed by the crowd and carried in triumph back to the convention.

== Assassination ==
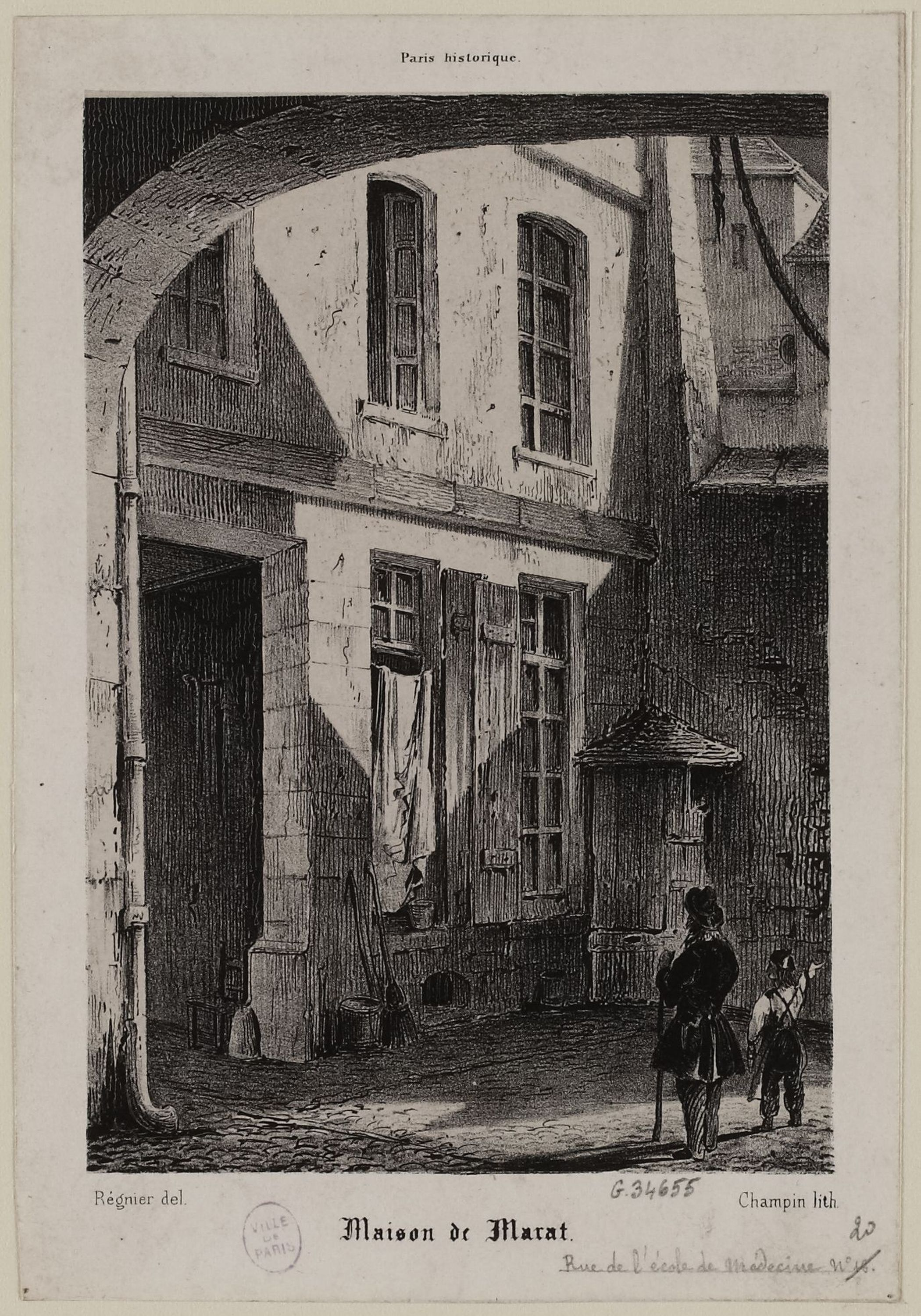
Paris historique. Maison de Marat dans Rue de l'École-de-Médecine (Paris)

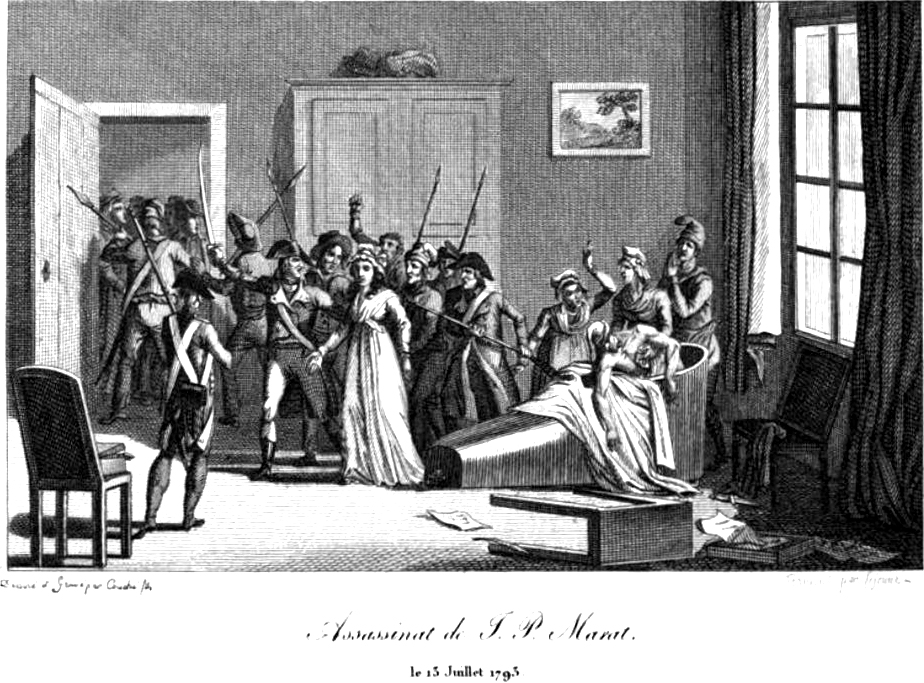
The arrest of Charlotte Corday following Marat's assassination on 13 July 1793

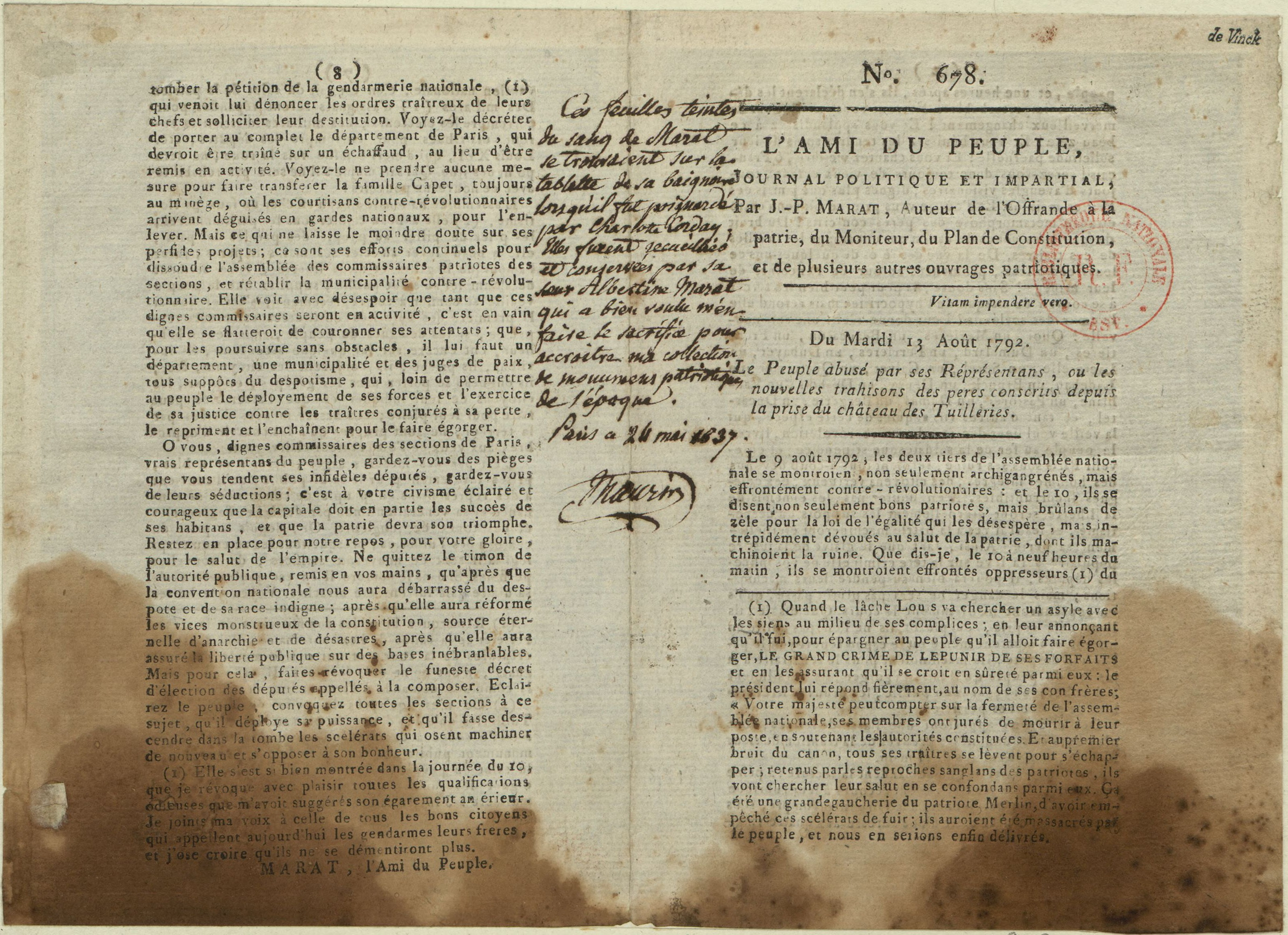
Bloodstained copy of L'Ami du peuple no. 678 (13 August 1792), concerning the aftermath of the storming of the Tuileries and the forthcoming National Convention. The provenance note was added by Antoine Maurin in 1837.

Marat played an active role in the insurrection of 31 May–2 June 1793 that brought about the fall of the Girondins. On 1 June, he went to the Hôtel de Ville and urged the people to remain mobilized, and reportedly rang the tocsin. Later that day, when the Committee of Public Safety proposed taking three days to consider the demand for the arrest of the Girondin deputies, Marat demanded a decision within one day. On 2 June, the convention, surrounded by National Guardsmen under François Hanriot, ordered the arrest of the leading Girondins. Marat, who was presiding over the convention, took an active part in determining which deputies were to be arrested, removing several names from the proposed list.

After the insurrection, Marat's illness worsened. In a letter to the Jacobins on 20 June, he wrote that he was confined to bed with an "inflammatory illness"; four days later, in a letter to the convention, he stated that he had been suffering from the condition for five months.

On Saturday 13 July, Charlotte Corday, a young woman from Caen who sympathized with the Girondins, came to Marat's home. She had originally intended to kill him at the National Convention, but learned that his illness prevented him from attending its sessions. After being refused admission earlier in the day, she returned in the evening, claiming to have information about Girondin deputies who had taken refuge in Caen after their expulsion from the convention. She carried with her a note appealing to Marat's sympathy: "I am unhappy; it is enough that I am so to have a right to your protection." Marat, whose illness confined him to a medicinal bath for much of the day, eventually ordered that she be admitted and received her there around eight in the evening. Corday named several of the deputies. According to her later testimony, Marat told her that they would soon be guillotined in Paris, words which she said decided his fate. She then drew a kitchen knife concealed in her clothing and stabbed Marat once in the chest. Mortally wounded, he called to Simonne Évrard, "Aidez-moi, ma chère amie!" ("Help me, my dear friend!"), and died shortly afterwards. News of the assassination quickly drew a large crowd to the Rue des Cordeliers, where cannon were positioned at both ends of the street as Corday was taken away to prison.

Corday came from a royalist Norman family; two of her brothers had emigrated and joined the royalist armies. She had attended meetings of the Girondin deputies in Caen, but during her interrogation insisted that she had conceived and carried out the assassination herself. Asked why she had killed Marat, she replied that she wanted "to restore peace to my country" (rendre la paix à mon pays), referring to "the ravages of France" which she regarded as his work (les ravages de la France que je regarde comme son ouvrage).

Marat's assassination heightened political tensions in France and provoked indignation, anger and calls for vengeance in Paris. Corday was tried before the Revolutionary Tribunal on 17 July 1793. During her interrogation and trial, she maintained that she had acted alone and denied that the Girondins had been involved in a conspiracy to assassinate Marat. She was convicted of the murder and guillotined later that day. According to Sanson's account, Corday remained calm during the journey to the scaffold and faced her execution with composure.

== Memory and legacy ==
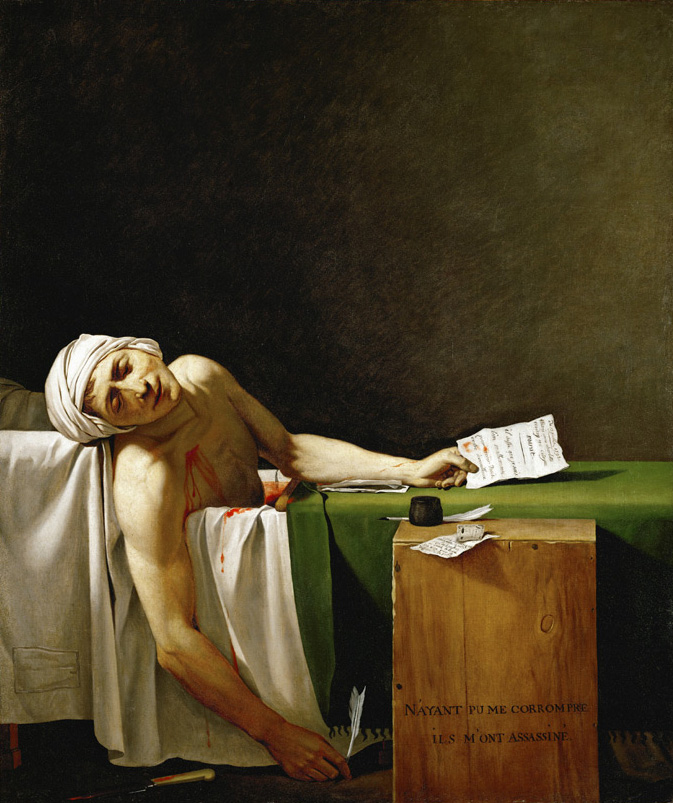
The Death of Marat by Jacques-Louis David (1793)

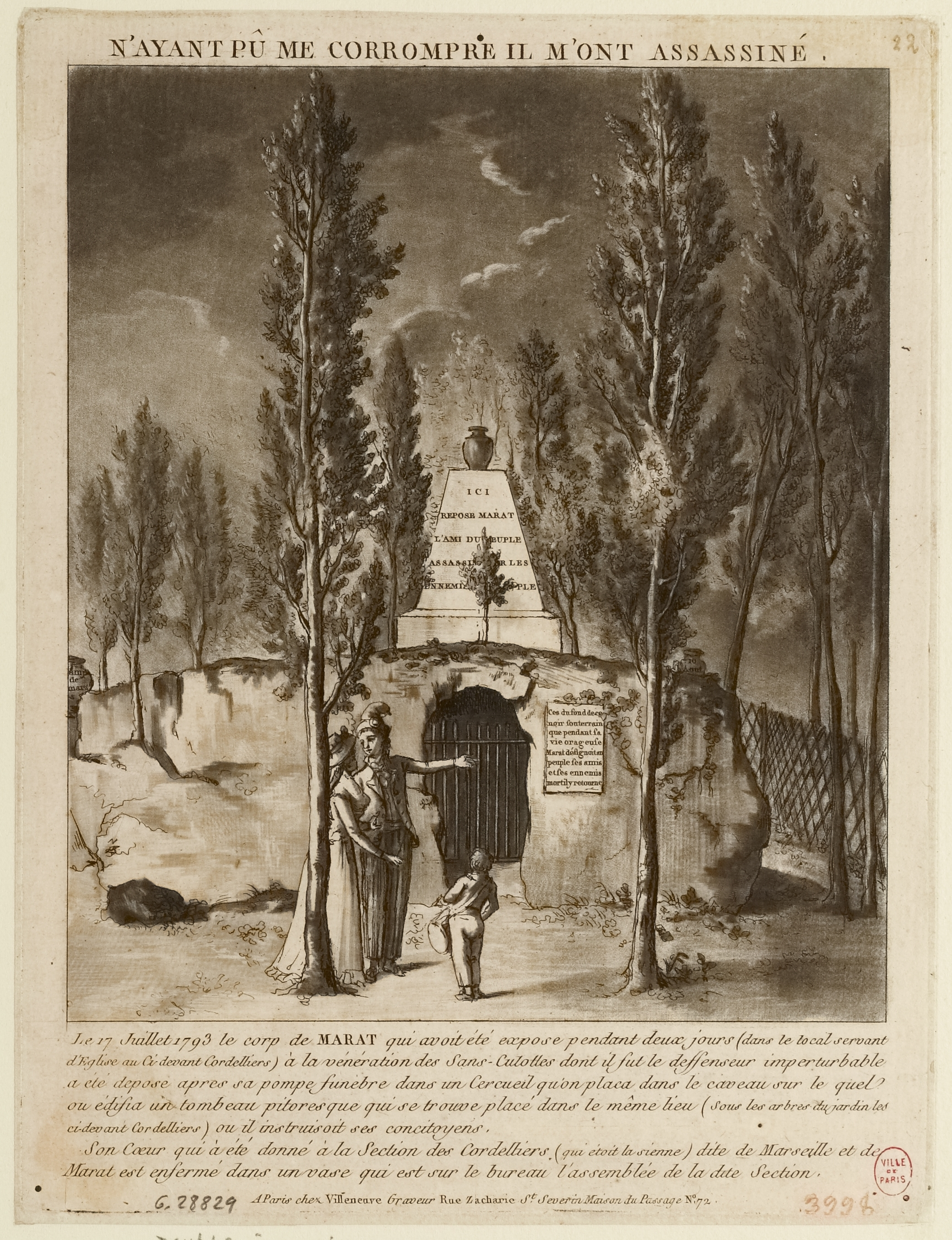
Tomb of Jean-Paul Marat in the garden of the former Cordeliers Convent, July 1793.

Unveiling of the bust of Marat at the tomb erected in honor of him and Lazowski, at Place de la Réunion on 18 August 1793

Marat's assassination was followed by an elaborate public cult. The National Convention commissioned Jacques-Louis David to organize his funeral, which took place in the late afternoon on 16 July 1793. Marat's body was displayed before being carried in procession to the former Cordeliers Convent, where he was buried beneath the trees in the convent garden late in the evening. A funerary monument designed by the sculptor Jean-François Martin was subsequently erected there. David also commemorated Marat in The Death of Marat, which became one of the best-known images of the Revolution.

After Marat's death, Simonne and Albertine lived together in Quartier Latin and on Île de la Cité, where they supported themselves by making watch hands. In 1794, Nicolas Benoît Mathelin published a two-act historical drama entitled: Marat dans le souterrain des Cordeliers, ou la journée du 10 août.

In the months following his death, Marat was commemorated as a revolutionary martyr in festivals, monuments and political imagery. On 30 July 1793, commissioners from the Paris sections, meeting with the Society of Revolutionary Republican Women, requested that an obelisk in his memory be erected on the Place de la Réunion, then the name of the Place du Carrousel. The Commune subsequently gave provisional authorization for a wooden obelisk. The site already contained the grave and a monument to Claude François Lazowski, a popular revolutionary leader who had died in April 1793. Marat was subsequently commemorated there alongside Lazowski, with a monument incorporating Marat's bust and the bathtub in which he had been assassinated. On 29 September 1793, the Marquis de Sade, delivered an address at a ceremony organized by his section in honour of Marat and Le Peletier as "martyrs of liberty".

Streets and public places were also renamed in Marat's honour. The former rue des Cordeliers, where he had lived and been assassinated, was renamed rue Marat. On 15 November 1793, Montmartre was renamed Mont-Marat. The Section du Théâtre-Français, which included the Cordeliers district where Marat had lived and worked, also took his name.

In November 1793, the port city of Le Havre likewise changed its name to Havre-Marat, a name it retained until January 1795. Busts, portraits and medallions of Marat proliferated, and ceremonies in his honour were organized by Parisian sections and popular societies. His commemoration acquired features of a secular martyr cult, which developed alongside the dechristianization movement and the Cult of Reason. Marat's remains were transferred to the Panthéon on 21 September 1794.

The Thermidorian Reaction brought a rapid reversal of Marat's official cult. Le Havre abandoned the name Havre-Marat in January 1795, while busts and other representations of Marat were publicly removed or destroyed. On 2 February 1795, his remains were removed from the Panthéon. Le Moniteur Universel reported that busts of Marat had been torn from their pedestals and that one was carried through the streets before being thrown into a sewer in the rue Montmartre to cries of « Marat, voilà ton Panthéon ! ». His remains were reinterred in the former Sainte-Geneviève cemetery, near the church of Saint-Étienne-du-Mont.

A bronze sculpture of Marat was removed from Parc des Buttes Chaumont and was melted down during the Nazi occupation of Paris. Another was created in 2013 for the Musée de la Révolution française. In his birthplace Boudry, a square is named Place Marat.

In 1964, Peter Weiss drew on the historical association between Sade and Marat for his play Marat/Sade, which imagines Sade directing a play about Marat's assassination at the asylum of Charenton. The play contrasts Marat's commitment to revolutionary social change with Sade's individualism and scepticism about the possibility of political progress. Peter Brook directed its celebrated Royal Shakespeare Company production and subsequently the 1967 film adaptation.

From 1917 onward, Russian Marxist and later Soviet writers often portrayed Marat as a defender of the poor and working people. Ivan Skvortsov-Stepanov's biography, first published in 1917, appeared in a fourth edition in 1919 in the series Whom the Proletariat Erects Monuments To. In the Soviet Union, Marat's surname was adopted as a male given name; a 1968 study of Soviet Russian names described Marat as having previously been one of the most popular Soviet names.

=== Skin disease ===
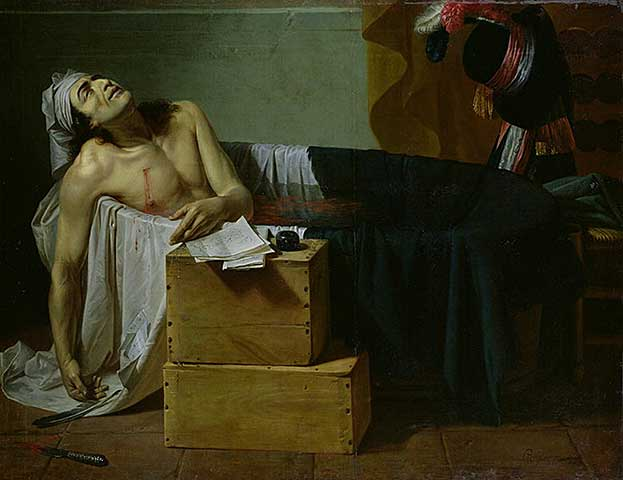
The Death of Marat by Guillaume-Joseph Roques (1793); a knife lies on the floor at lower left in the paintings by Roques and David

Marat suffered from a chronic and increasingly debilitating skin disease, the nature of which has been the subject of several retrospective diagnoses. In 1979, dermatologist Josef E. Jelinek described the condition as intensely itchy and blistering, beginning in the perianal region and eventually being associated with severe weight loss. He considered dermatitis herpetiformis the most likely diagnosis.

Marat sought relief by taking medicinal baths, particularly as his condition worsened during the last months of his life. Various substances were added to the bath, and he reportedly wore a cloth soaked in vinegar around his head.

A 2020 metagenomic study analysed DNA recovered from a bloodstained newspaper associated with Marat's assassination. The researchers found no evidence for several infectious agents previously proposed as causes of his illness and suggested that a fungal infection, possibly seborrhoeic dermatitis, was a plausible explanation.

=== Tub ===
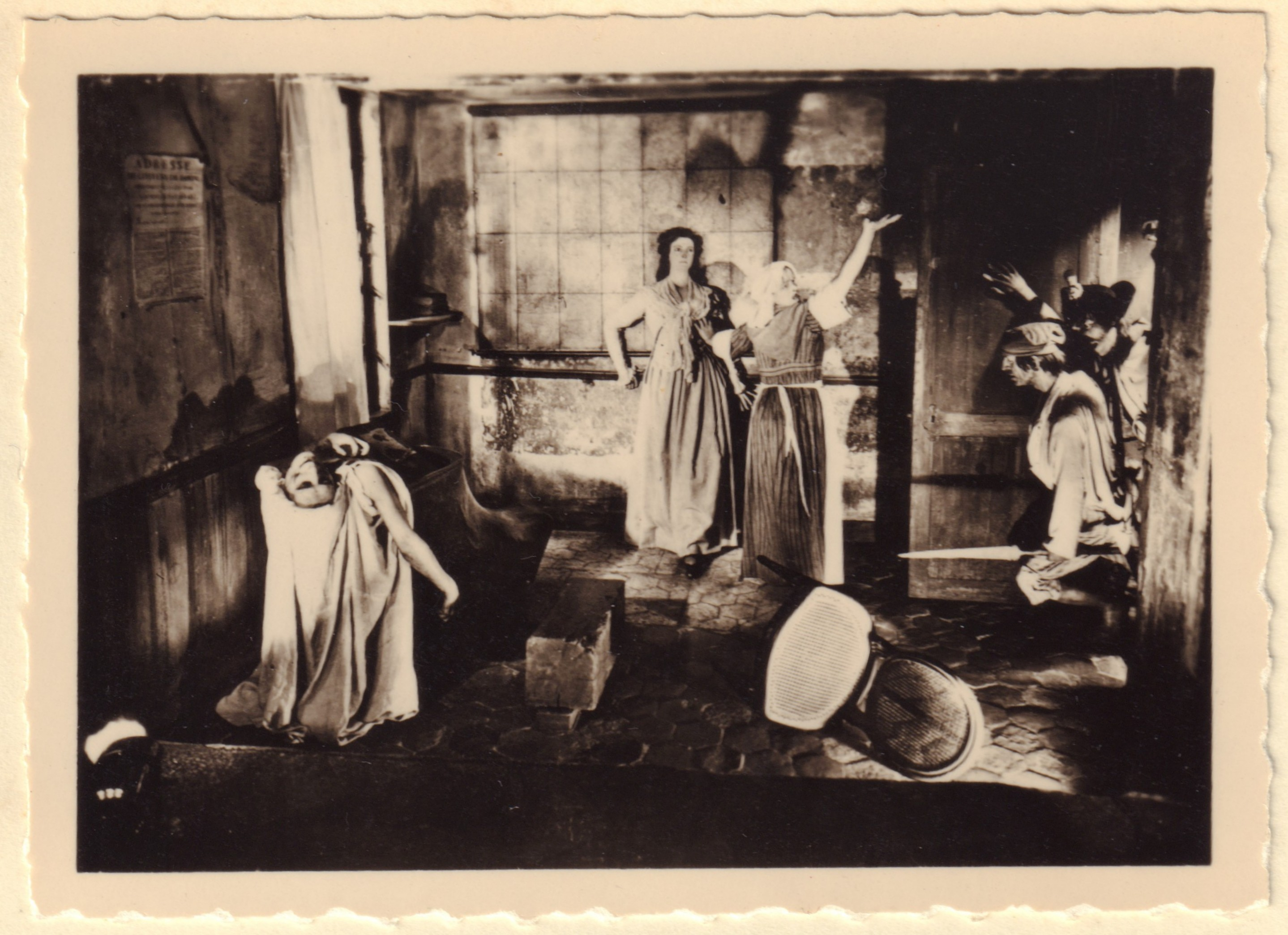
Reconstruction of Marat's assassination at the Musée Grévin, including the bathtub acquired by the museum in 1886.

The Musée Grévin in Paris displays a copper bathtub which it identifies as the tub in which Marat was assassinated. Its documented provenance, however, does not extend back to Marat. In 1804, Marie-Joseph-André-Augustin Capriol de Saint-Hilaire brought the tub to the fr:Château de Beauchamp at Taverny, having previously acquired it from a scrap-metal dealer in Paris. After the deaths of Saint-Hilaire and his wife in 1849–1850, it passed to their daughter Marie-Adélaïde-André-Augustine. On her death in 1861, she left her possessions to the abbé Joseph Rio, with whom she had been living. Rio subsequently moved several times, taking the tub with him; after his death in 1876 it passed to the bishopric of Vannes and subsequently to the abbé Le Cosse.

Baignoire sabot

The tub attracted wider attention after Le Figaro published an article about it in July 1885. Its identification as Marat's bathtub was already disputed at the time: the detailed inventory made of Marat's possessions after his death apparently did not mention a bathtub, and the Musée Carnavalet declined to acquire it because of the absence of documentary proof of its provenance. The Musée Grévin acquired the tub in 1886 and incorporated it into its reconstruction of Marat's assassination, where it remains on display.

The tub is a copper baignoire sabot, a high-backed type designed to reduce the amount of water required for bathing. Such copper tubs could also be rented in eighteenth-century Paris.

== Works ==
- Les Aventures du jeune comte Potowski: un roman de cœur (completed 1771; first published in Le Siècle in 1847; first complete book edition, edited by Paul Lacroix, Paris, 1848), 2 vols. Vol. 1 and Vol. 2 at Project Gutenberg.
- A Philosophical Essay on Man (1773) (in English)
- Lettres polonaises (epistolary novel attributed to Marat, but of disputed authorship; first published in English as Polish Letters in 1905; French edition by Apostolos P. Kouidis, 1993)
- The Chains of Slavery (1774) (in English)
- An Essay on Gleets &c. (1775) (in English)
- Enquiry into the Nature, Cause, and Cure of a Singular Disease of the Eyes (1776) (in English)
- De l'Homme (1776) (translation of his 1773 English work)
- Découvertes de M. Marat sur le feu, l'électricité et la lumière (1779)
- Plan de Législation Criminelle (1780)
- Recherches physiques sur le feu (1780)
- Découvertes de M. Marat sur la lumière, constatées par une suite d'expériences nouvelles (1780)
- Recherches physiques sur l'électricité, &c (1782)
- Mémoire sur l'électricité médicale (1783)
- Notions élémentaires d'optique (1784)
- Lettres de l'observateur Bon Sens à M. de M sur la fatale catastrophe des infortunés Pilatre de Rozier et Ronzain, les aéronautes et l'aérostation (1785)
- Observations de M. l'amateur Avec à M. l'abbé Sans . . . &c., (1785)
- Éloge de Montesquieu : présenté à l'Académie de Bordeaux, le 28 mars 1785 / par J.-P. Maratz; publié avec une introduction, par Arthur de Brézetz,...Éloge de Montesquieu (1785) (provincial Academy competition entry first published 1883 by M. de Bresetz)
- Optique de Newton (1787)
- Mémoires académiques (1788)
- Offrande à la Patrie (1789) (pamphlet)
- Constitution, ou projet de déclaration des Droits de l'Homme et du Citoyen (1789) (pamphlet)
- Les Charlatans modernes, ou lettres sur le charlatanisme académique (L'Ami du Peuple, 1791) (pamphlet)
- Les chaînes de l'Esclavage (1792) (translation of his 1774 English work)
- La Correspondance de Marat (collected and annotated by Charles Vellay, 1908)

== Cited sources ==
- Belfort Bax, Ernest (1901). Jean-Paul Marat; The People's Friend, A Biographical Sketch. Vogt Press; Read Books (2008). ISBN 978-1-4437-2362-6.
- Conner, Clifford D. (1999). Jean Paul Marat: scientist and revolutionary. Amherst, New York: Humanity Books. ISBN 978-1573926072.
- Conner, Clifford D. (2012). Jean-Paul Marat: Tribune of the French Revolution. Pluto Press. ISBN 978-1849646802.
- Coquard, Olivier (1991) "La politique de Marat". Annales historiques de la Révolution française, no. 285, pp. 325–351.
- Doyle, William (2002). The Oxford History of the French Revolution (2nd ed.). Oxford: Oxford University Press. ISBN 978-0-19-925298-5.
- Gottschalk, Louis Reichenthal (1927). Jean Paul Marat: a study in radicalism. University of Chicago Press. ISBN 978-0226305325.
