= Joseph-François Marie =

French mathematician (1738–1801)

- Born: 25 November 1738; Rodez
- Died: 24 February 1801 (aged 62); Klaipėda
- Occupation: Catholic priest, university teacher, translator, presbyter
- Employer: Collège des Quatre-Nations (1762–1791)
- Position held: abbot

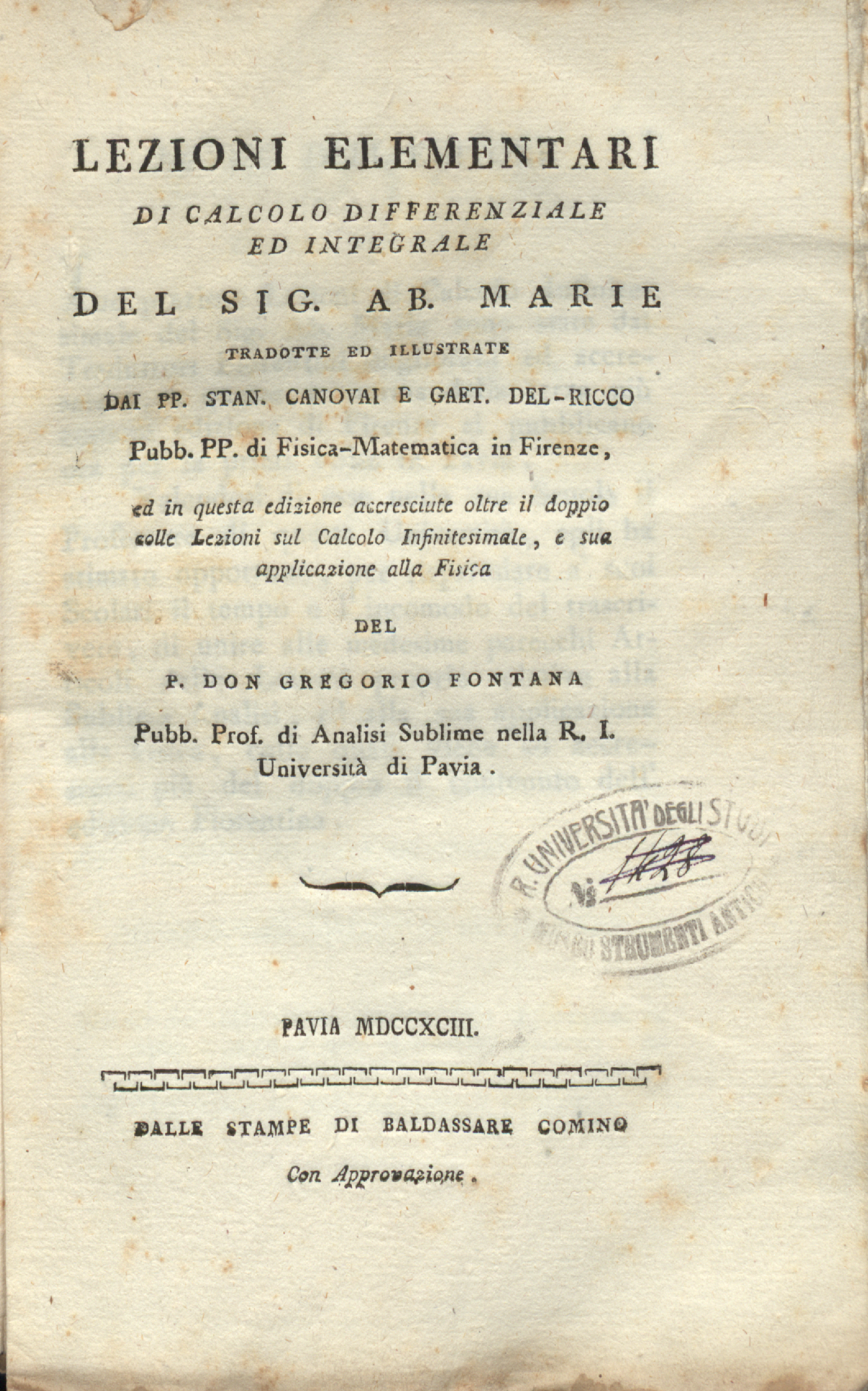
Lecons elementaires, Italian ed.

Joseph-François Marie (1738 – 1801) was a French mathematician.

He was an abbot and professor of mathematics at the Collège Mazarin.

== Works ==
- Lecons elementaires de mathematiques (in Italian). Florence: Guglielmo Piatti, Pietro Allegrini. 1803.
