= Brunswick Estate =

Brunswick Estate may refer to:

- Brunswick (Hove), Sussex
- Brunswick, West Midlands (Wednesbury)
