= Larder =

Cool room for storing food

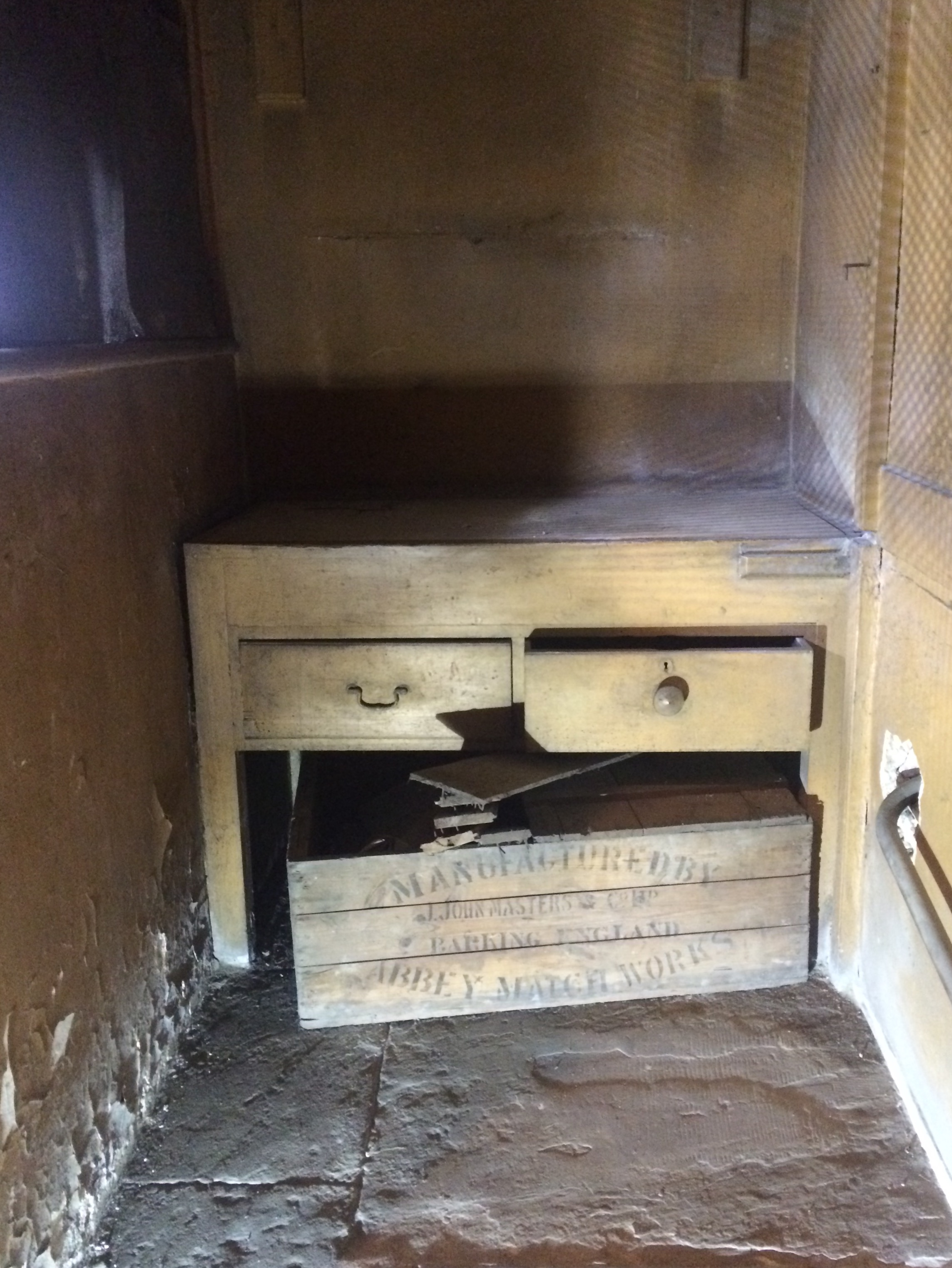
A pastry larder at The Regency Town House in Hove. A marble-topped table and deep drawers which would have contained flour and sugar allowed pastry to be made away from the heat of the kitchen.

A larder is a cool area for storing food prior to use. Originally, it was where raw meat was larded—covered in pig fat—to be preserved. This method slowed spoilage by sealing out air, bacteria, and moisture. In colder larders (4 °C/40 °F or lower), larded meat could last for months, while in warmer conditions, the fat turned rancid within weeks. By the 18th century, the term had expanded: at that point, a dry larder was where bread, pastry, milk, butter, or cooked meats were stored. Larders were commonplace in houses before the widespread use of the refrigerator.

Stone larders were designed to keep cold in the hottest weather. They had slate or marble shelves two or three inches thick. These shelves were wedged into thick stone walls. Fish or vegetables were laid directly onto the shelves and covered with muslin or handfuls of wet rushes were sprinkled under and around.

== Essential qualities ==
- Cool, dry, and well-ventilated.
- Usually on the shady side of the house.
- No fireplaces or hot flues in any of the adjoining walls.
- Might have a door to an outside yard.
- Had windows with wire gauze in them instead of glass.

== Description ==
In the northern hemisphere, most houses would be arranged to have their larders and kitchens on the north or west side of the house where they received the least sun. In Australia and New Zealand, larders were placed on the south or east sides of the house for the same reason.

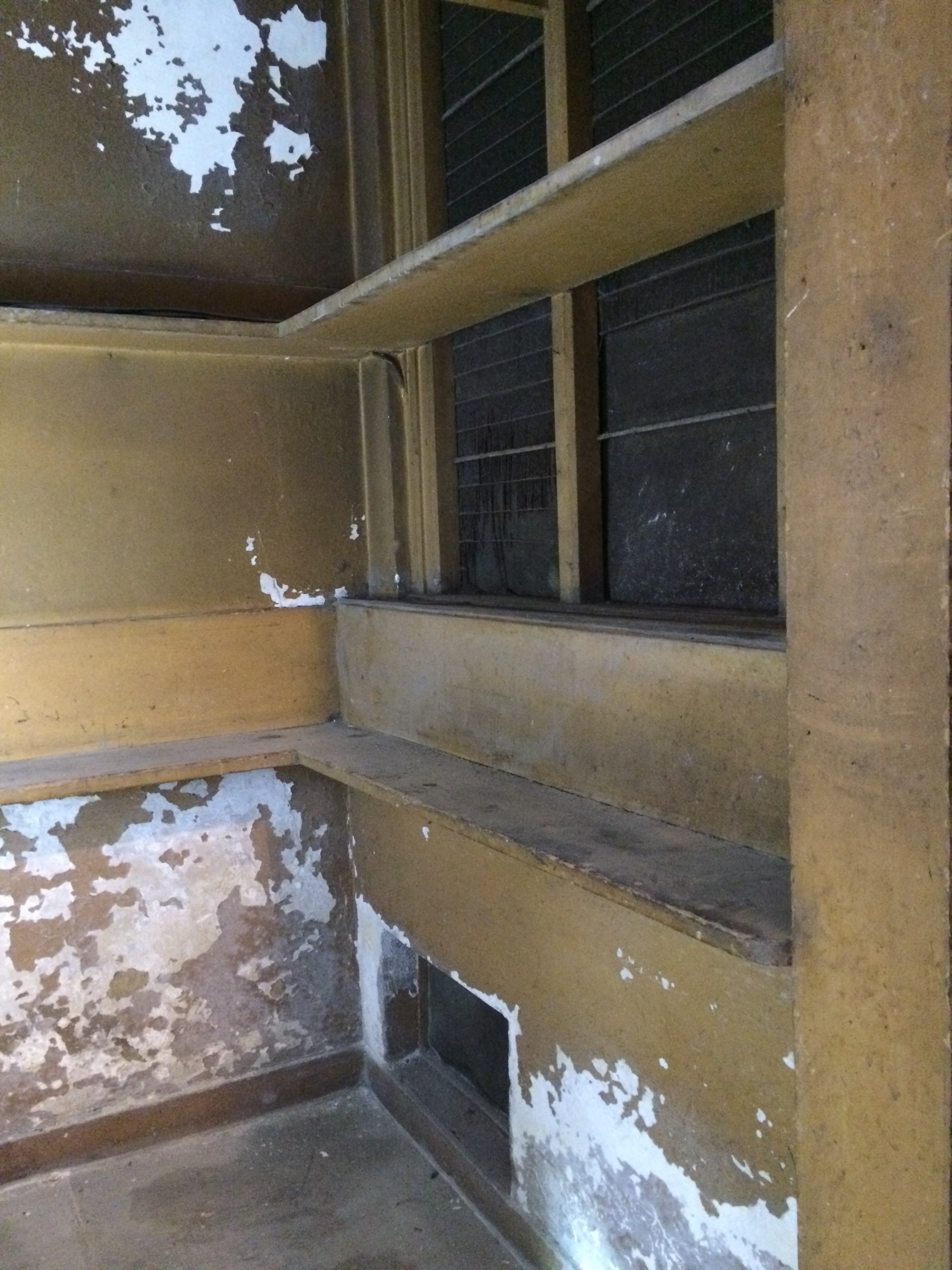
Inside the meat safe or wet larder at The Regency Town House in Hove, Britain. Meat larders have hooks for hanging joints of meat.

Many larders have small, unglazed windows with window openings covered in fine mesh. This allows free circulation of air without allowing flies to enter. Many larders also have tiled or painted walls to simplify cleaning. Older larders, and especially those in larger houses, have hooks in the ceiling to hang joints of meat.

== Etymology ==
Middle English (denoting a store of meat): from Old French lardier, from medieval Latin lardarium, from laridum.

== History ==
In medieval households, the word "larder" referred both to an office responsible for fish, jams, and meat, as well as to the room in which these commodities were kept. It was headed by a larderer. The Scots term for larder was spence, and referred specifically to a place from which stores or food were distributed, hence in Scotland larderers (also pantlers and cellarers) were known as spencers.

The office generally was subordinated to the kitchen and existed as a separate office only in larger households. It was closely connected to other offices of the kitchen, such as the saucery and the scullery.

Larders were used by the Indus Valley civilization to store bones of goats, oxen, and sheep. These larders were made of large clay pots.

== Animal larders ==
Places where animals store food for later consumption are sometimes referred to as 'larders', a well-known example being the hoards of seeds and nuts hidden by squirrels to provide a store of fresh food during the leaner months of the year.

For alligators and crocodiles, larders are underwater storage places for their fresh kills until such time as they wish to consume the carcass when its flesh is rotten. These larders are usually dug into the side of a land bank, or wedged under a log or tree root.

== See also ==
- Food storage
- Root cellar

== Bibliography ==
- Halliday, Tim, gen. ed. (1994). Animal Behavior. Oklahoma: UOP.
