= David Lionel Goldsmid-Stern-Salomons =

British scientific author, barrister and pioneer of road transport

Sir David Goldsmid-Stern-Salomons Bt
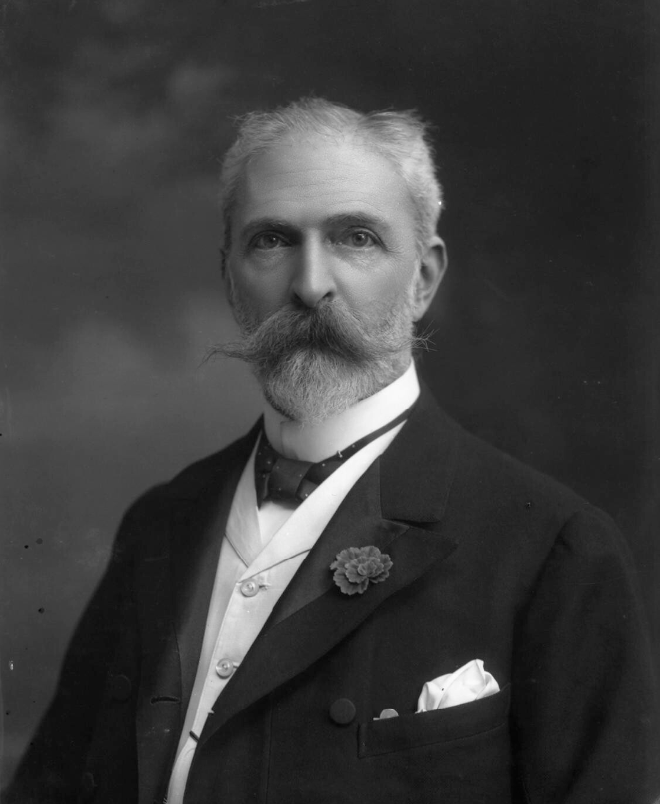
- Bassano Ltd c. 1909
- Born: 28 January 1851
- Died: 19 April 1925 (aged 74)
- Education: University College, London; Gonville and Caius College, Cambridge
- Occupations: Barrister, author
- Spouse: Laura de Stern
- Parent(s): Philip Salomons; Emma Montefiore
- Relatives: Hermann de Stern (father-in-law)

Sir David Lionel Goldsmid-Stern-Salomons, 2nd Baronet JP DL (28 January 1851 – 19 April 1925) was a British scientific author, barrister and pioneer of road transport.

== Early life ==
The son of Philip Salomons of Brighton, and Emma, daughter of Jacob Eliezer Montefiore of Barbados, he succeeded to the Baronetcy originally granted to his uncle David Salomons in 1873. He married Laura, daughter of Baron Hermann de Stern (of Portugal) and Julia, daughter of Aaron Asher Goldsmid, brother of Sir Isaac Lyon Goldsmid, by whom he had one son and four daughters. He assumed the additional surnames and arms of Goldsmid and Stern in 1899.

He studied at University College, London and at Gonville and Caius College, Cambridge, gaining a BA in 1874. In the same year he was called to the bar at the Middle Temple.

== Career ==
He went on to produce several scientific works and pamphlets. He was a JP, DL and Sheriff (1880) of Kent, mayor and alderman of Tunbridge Wells, county councilor for the Tonbridge division of Kent for 15 years, J.P. for London, Middlesex, Sussex, and Westminster, and chairman (1896–1900) and joint managing director (1915–23) of the City of London Electric Lighting Company.

== Interests ==
Salomons had an interest in photography. He joined the Photographic Society of Great Britain, later the Royal Photographic Society, in 1887 and gained its Fellowship in 1895. He remained a member until his death.

== House ==
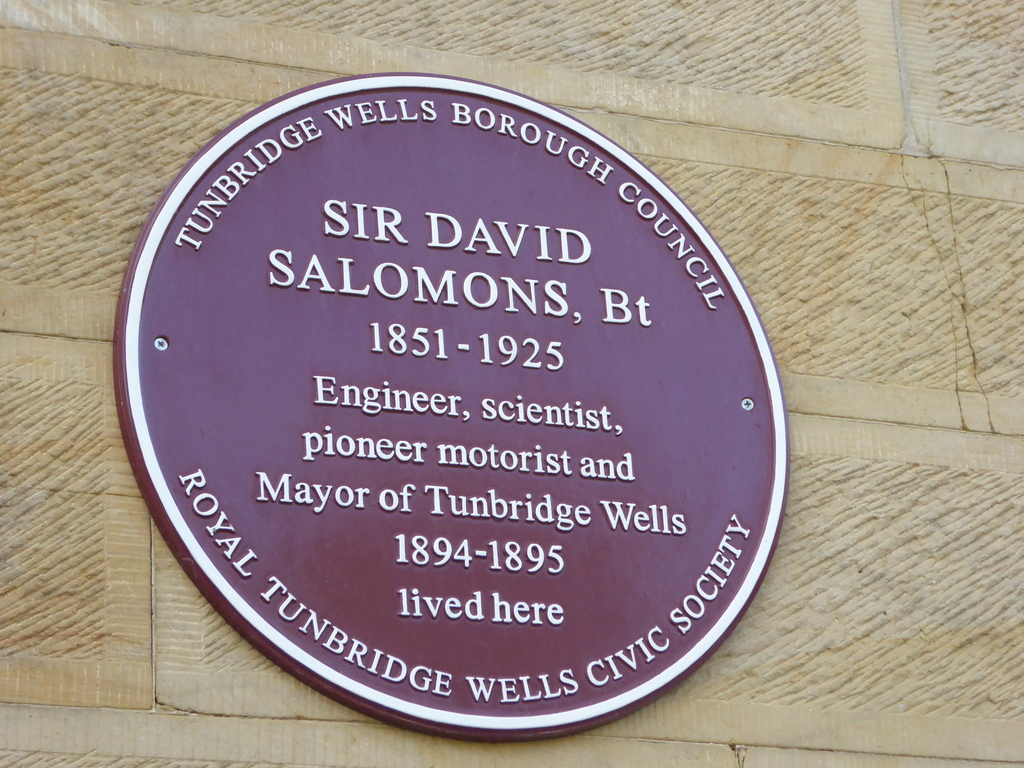
David Lionel Goldsmid-Stern-Salomons blue plaque

His home north of Tunbridge Wells, Broomhill, is preserved as the Salomons Museum. It is also a part of Markerstudy Group, and is a centre for postgraduate training, research and consultancy.

Salomons was interested in electricity from an early age and when he inherited Broomhill in 1873, he set up large laboratories and workshops where he investigated electromotive force and electric conductors and carried out countless experiments. He took out patents for electric lamps, current meters and various improvements to electrical equipment. The workshops were said to contain some 60,000 tools, which could manufacture anything from a watch to a steam engine and also included a huge electromagnet.

One of the new technologies Salomons installed at Broomhill was electric light. He had his own coal-fired generator and could produce enough electricity for 1,000 sixteen candle-power (about 60 watt) light bulbs. Electricity was installed on a small scale at first, in the workshops in 1874, where it was used for an arc light and to drive motors. Domestic electric lighting did not come in until about 1877–1880 when Joseph Swan invented a light bulb that could be used in homes, and Broomhill became one of the first to be lit with electricity.

Salomons also developed one of the first electric cooking devices, an electric butter churn and the first electric alarms, all made and installed by Salomons and his staff. There is also a Welte Philharmonic organ from 1914.

== Horology ==
In addition to his many other achievements, he developed a lifelong passion for horology and became the leading authority in his lifetime on the work of the famed Swiss-French watchmaker Abraham-Louis Breguet, who is generally acknowledged as the greatest watchmaker of all time. In 1921 he self-published the first major work on Breguet's life and career, including a detailed review of Breguet's inventions, and a timeline of production, with illustrations of major timepieces from his own collection.

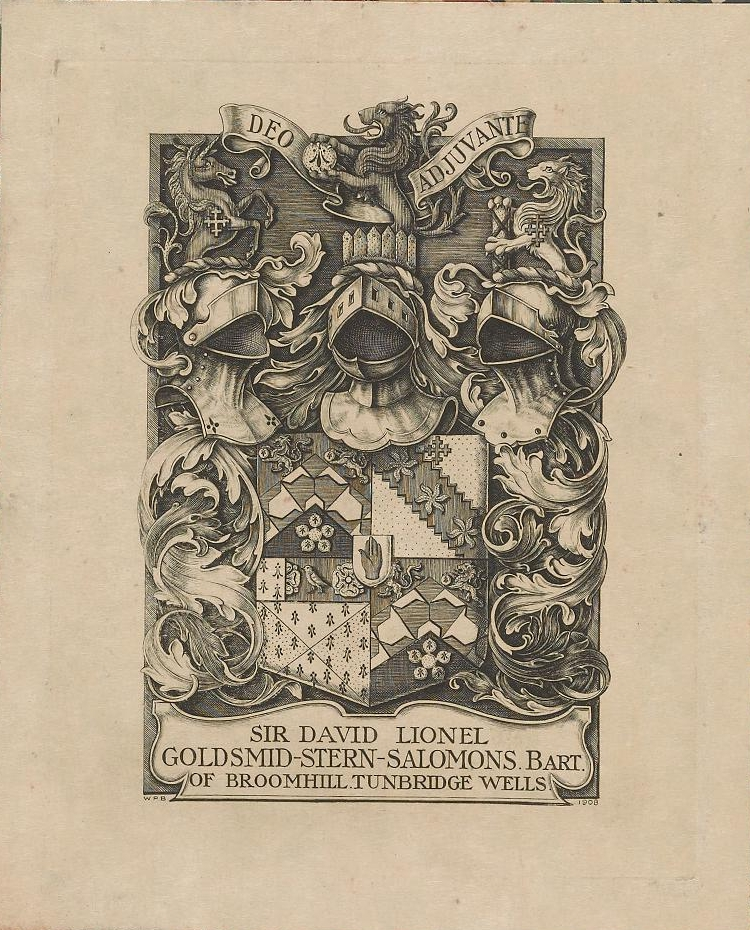
Bookplate

Over the course of his lifetime Salomons amassed the world's largest private collection of Breguet watches and clocks, comprising 124 pieces, including the two watches considered to be the pinnacle of Breguet's art—the "Marie Antoinette" (No. 160) and the "Duc de Praslin" (No. 92). In 1924 Salomons donated the "Duc de Praslin" to the Musée des Arts et Métiers in Paris, but it was subsequently stolen. Fortunately, after three months of tinkering with the watch, the thief was apprehended and the watch recovered when he took it to a renowned Parisian watch specialist for repair.

He left some of his collection to his wife and she later took them to Sotheby's to be auctioned, although on her first visit she was reportedly dismissed from the office because the Sotheby's staffer could not believe that anyone could possibly have owned such a collection. The timepieces were subsequently sold at auction for considerable sums.

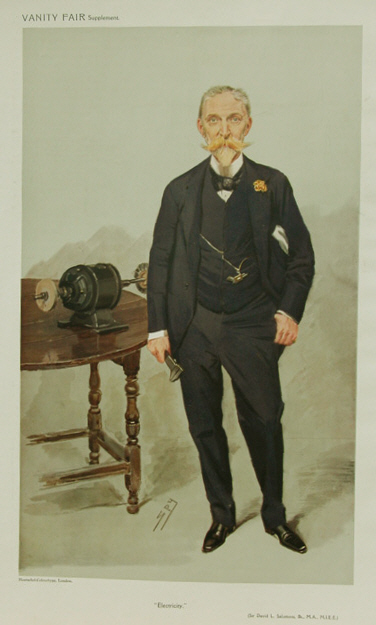
Caricature by Spy for Vanity Fair, 1908

In 1980, British master horologist George Daniels catalogued the Salomons collection and published a study on it. Three years later, on the night of 15 April 1983, the Mayer Institute was burgled and 106 rare timepieces were stolen, including the entire Salomons collection. The multimillion-dollar theft was Israel's largest-ever robbery—by this time, the "Marie Antoinette" alone was valued at nearly US$20 million. The case remained unsolved until 2006 when a Tel Aviv watchmaker tipped off Israeli police that he had paid US$40,000 to an anonymous person to purchase 40 timepieces, including the missing "Marie Antoinette".

Forensic experts examined the timepieces they recovered and detectives questioned the lawyer who negotiated the sale; their investigation led police to an Israeli woman living in Los Angeles, Nili Shamrat, whom they identified as the widow of Naaman Diller, the notorious Israeli criminal who carried out the burglary and then fled to Europe, before settling in the United States. When Israeli police and American officials arrived at Shamrat's home to question her, they found more timepieces and 66 of the stolen Mayer Institute timepieces were eventually recovered.

== The Hythe disaster ==
Sir David Salomons was appointed Honorary Colonel of the Kent Fortress Royal Engineers, a part-time Territorial Force unit, on 6 November 1908. His only son and heir, David Reginald Herman P. Salomons, served as an officer in the unit and commanded 3rd Kent Fortress Field Company as a captain during World War I. He died on 28 October 1915 during the Gallipoli Campaign when HMS Hythe carrying his company to Suvla Bay was sunk in an accidental collision with HMS Sarnia. Salomons and 128 of his men died. He has no known grave and is commemorated on the Helles Memorial. The baronetcy therefore became extinct on Sir David's death.

Baronetage of the United Kingdom
Preceded by David Salomons	Baronet (of Broom Hill); 1873–1925	Extinct
