= Goldsmid-Stern-Salomons baronets =

Extinct baronetcy in the Baronetage of the United Kingdom

Goldsmid-Stern-Salomons baronets of Broom Hill and Great Cumberland Place
- Escutcheon of the Salomons baronets
- Creation date: 1869
- Status: extinct
- Extinction date: 1925
- Seat(s): Broom Hill, Tunbridge Wells

The Salomons, later Goldsmid-Stern-Salomons Baronetcy, of Broom Hill in the Parish of Tunbridge in the County of Kent and of Great Cumberland Place in the County of Middlesex, was a title in the Baronetage of the United Kingdom. It was created on 26 October 1869 for David Salomons, a leading figure in the 19th century struggle for Jewish emancipation in the United Kingdom, with remainder in default of male issue of his own to his nephew David Lionel Salomons and the heirs male of his body. Salomons died childless and was succeeded according to the special remainder by his nephew, the second Baronet. He was the son of Philip Salomons, younger brother of the first Baronet. The second Baronet married Laura, daughter of Hermann Stern, 1st Baron de Stern (of Portugal) and Julia, daughter of Aaron Asher Goldsmid, brother of Sir Isaac Goldsmid, 1st Baronet. In 1899 he assumed the additional surnames of Goldsmid and Stern. The title became extinct on his death in 1925.

== Salomons, later Goldsmid-Stern-Salomons baronets, of Broom Hill and Great Cumberland Place (1869) ==
- Sir David Salomons, 1st Baronet (1797–1873)
- Sir David Lionel Goldsmid-Stern-Salomons, 2nd Baronet (1851–1925)

== See also ==
- Goldsmid baronets
- d'Avigdor-Goldsmid baronets
