= Brunswick Terrace Synagogue =

Former Orthodox synagogue, now listed building, in Hove, England

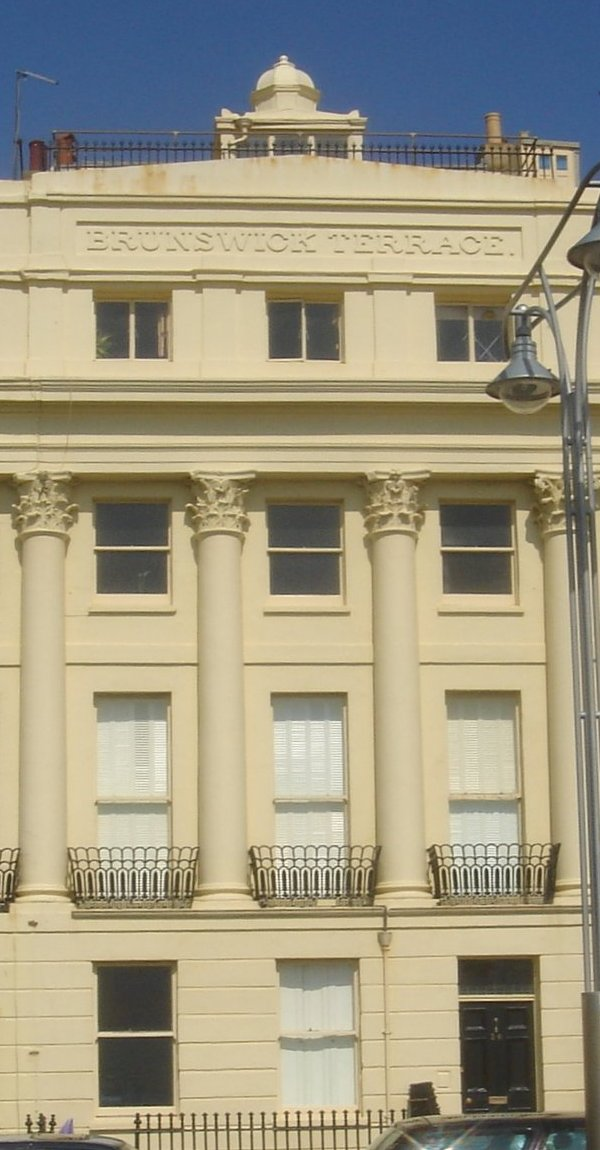
- The "pepper-pot cupola" on the roof-top of 26 Brunswick Terrace, that was part of the former synagogue

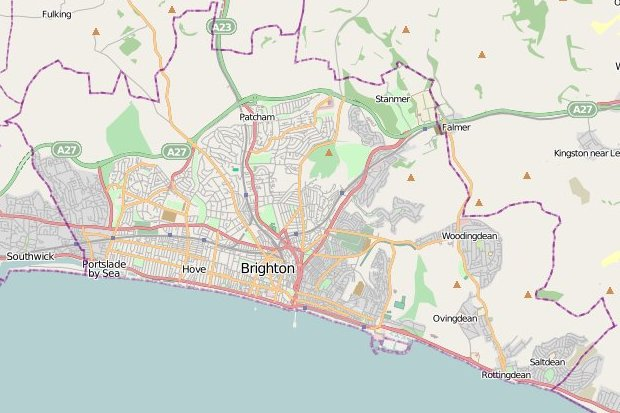
- Location of the former synagogue, in Brighton and Hove

Religion
- Affiliation: Orthodox Judaism (former)
- Rite: Nusach Ashkenaz
- Ecclesiastical or organizational status: Synagogue; Jewish museum; Residential dwelling
- Status: Closed (as a synagogue); Repurposed

Location
- Location: 26 Brunswick Terrace, Brunswick Estate, Hove, East Sussex, England
- Country: United Kingdom
- Interactive map of Brunswick Terrace Synagogue
- Coordinates: 50°49′25″N 0°09′39″W

Architecture
- Architects: Synagogue: unknown Terrace: Amon Henry Wilds; Charles Busby
- Type: Terraced house
- Style: Synagogue: Neoclassical; Terrace: Regency
- Founder: Philip Salomons
- Funded by: Philip Salomons
- Completed: c. 1852
- Direction of façade: South

Listed Building – Grade I
- Type: Listed building
- Designated: 24 March 1950
- Part of: Nos. 20–32 (Consecutive) and attached railings, Brunswick Terrace, Hove
- Reference no.: 1187546

The Brunswick Terrace Synagogue, also sometimes called the Roof-top synagogue, was a private Orthodox Jewish synagogue that was built on the roof-top of 26 Brunswick Terrace, a terraced-row of houses on the Brunswick Estate in Hove, now a constituent part of the city of Brighton and Hove, in East Sussex, England, in the United Kingdom.

The synagogue, completed in c. 1852, consists of a small octagonal edifice on the top of a glass room built on the roof of the home of Philip Salomons on the Regency-era terrace house, that was built in the period between 1824 and 1830. Salomons and his family worshipped in the Ashkenazi rite. The synagogue, now disused, is part of a Grade I listed consecutive row of terraced houses that were heritage-listed in 1950.

== History ==
Brunswick Terrace, built in four parts facing the English Channel coast on Hove seafront, was part of the Brunswick estate development laid out at the extreme east end of Hove following the rapid growth of neighbouring Brighton in the early 19th century, and particularly in response to Kemp Town. Although within the parish of Hove, it was closer to the boundary of Brighton and was considered part of the latter. The estate was laid out by Amon Henry Wilds and Charles Busby between 1824 and 1828. The terrace, described as an "elegant Regency block", is part of a Grade I listed consecutive row of terraced houses, from 20–32 Brunswick Terrace, that were heritage-listed in 1950.

The Salomons family moved into 26 Brunswick Terrace in the early 1850s. The interior was badly damaged by fire on 4 September 1852, and was subsequently restored. At some point between 1852 and his death in 1867, Salomons commissioned an unknown architect to design and build a private synagogue and prayer-room on the roof of the house. In common with the eastern half of Brunswick Terrace, only this, the central house, has a fourth floor above the portico. It was the subject of an acrimonious debate between Salomons and the members of the Middle Street Synagogue, since private synagogues violated the Laws of the Congregation.

In Salomons' lifetime, the synagogue displayed his fine collection of antique Judaica. For a period after his death, it was turned into a Jewish history museum. The Tablets of the Ten Commandments from the synagogue are preserved in the collection of the Salomons Museum in Tunbridge Wells.

The former synagogue forms past of a Grade I listed terraced row of houses. The house is in use as a private residence – the whole top floor forming one of the building's several flats. The cupola and base can be seen from the lawns on the promenade.

== Architecture ==
The synagogue is a pedimented, Neoclassical cube with glass from waist height, surmounted by an octagonal dome set atop an octagonal drum. Today it contains bench seating for approximately six people, around the edges. The large dome was intended as a replica of the Dome of the Rock in Jerusalem. The roof-top synagogue is one of a considerable number of synagogues and synagogue domes built in the form of an octagon, a tradition that developed from the once widely held opinion that the architects of the Dome of the Rock emulated the shape of the Temple in Jerusalem and, therefore, that the ancient Jewish Temple was octagonal in shape. An example of this opinion can be seen in Raphael's The Marriage of the Virgin.

== Gallery ==
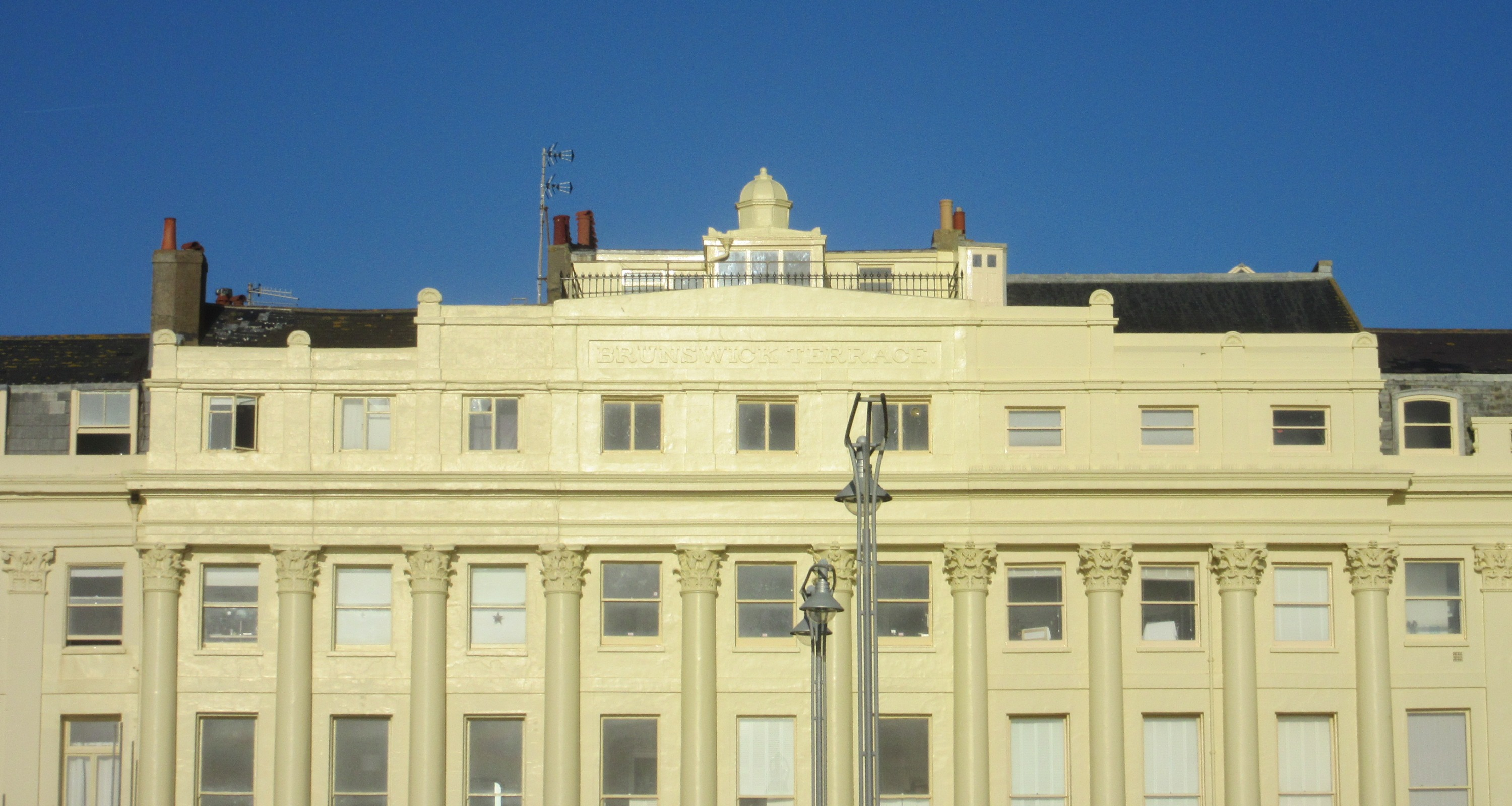
A detailed image of the cupola in perspective of 26 Brunswick Terrace

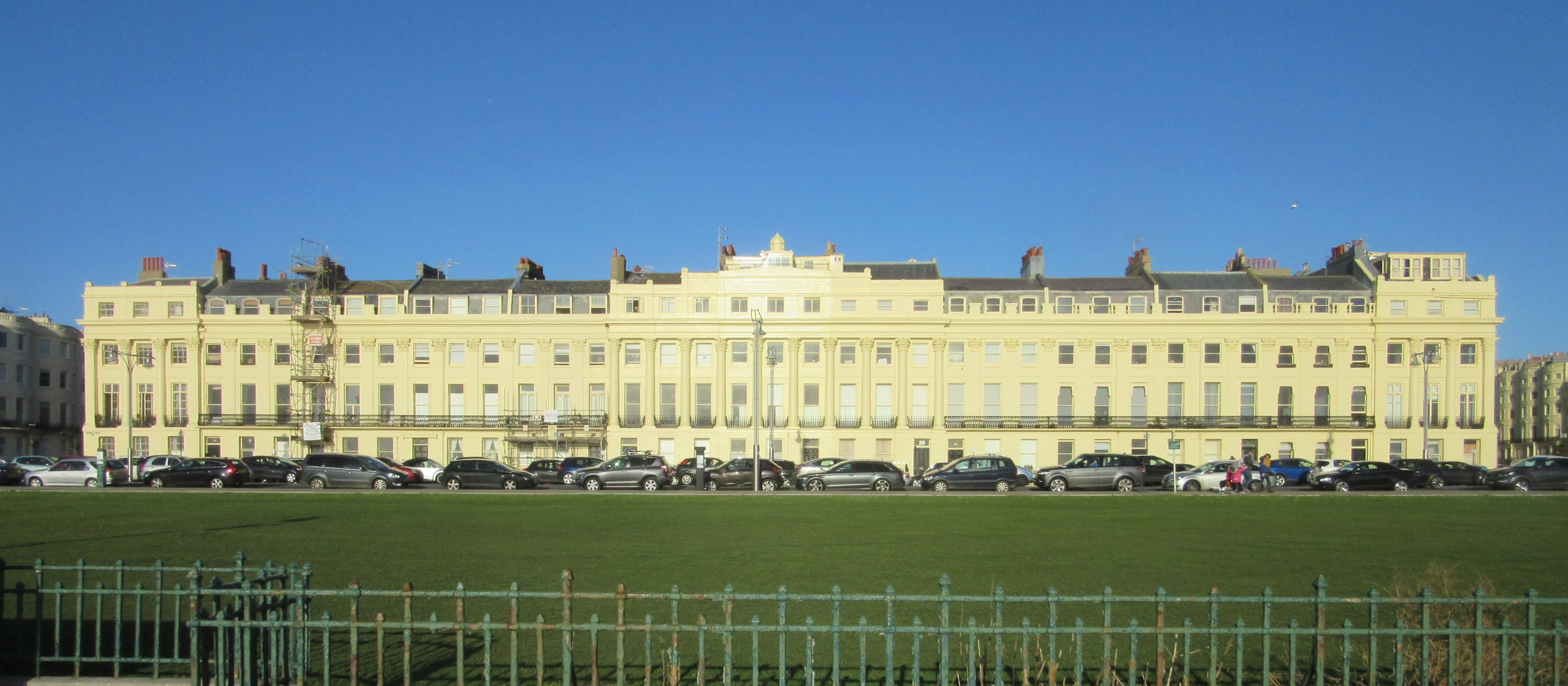
The Grade I listed row of 20–32 Brunswick Terrace

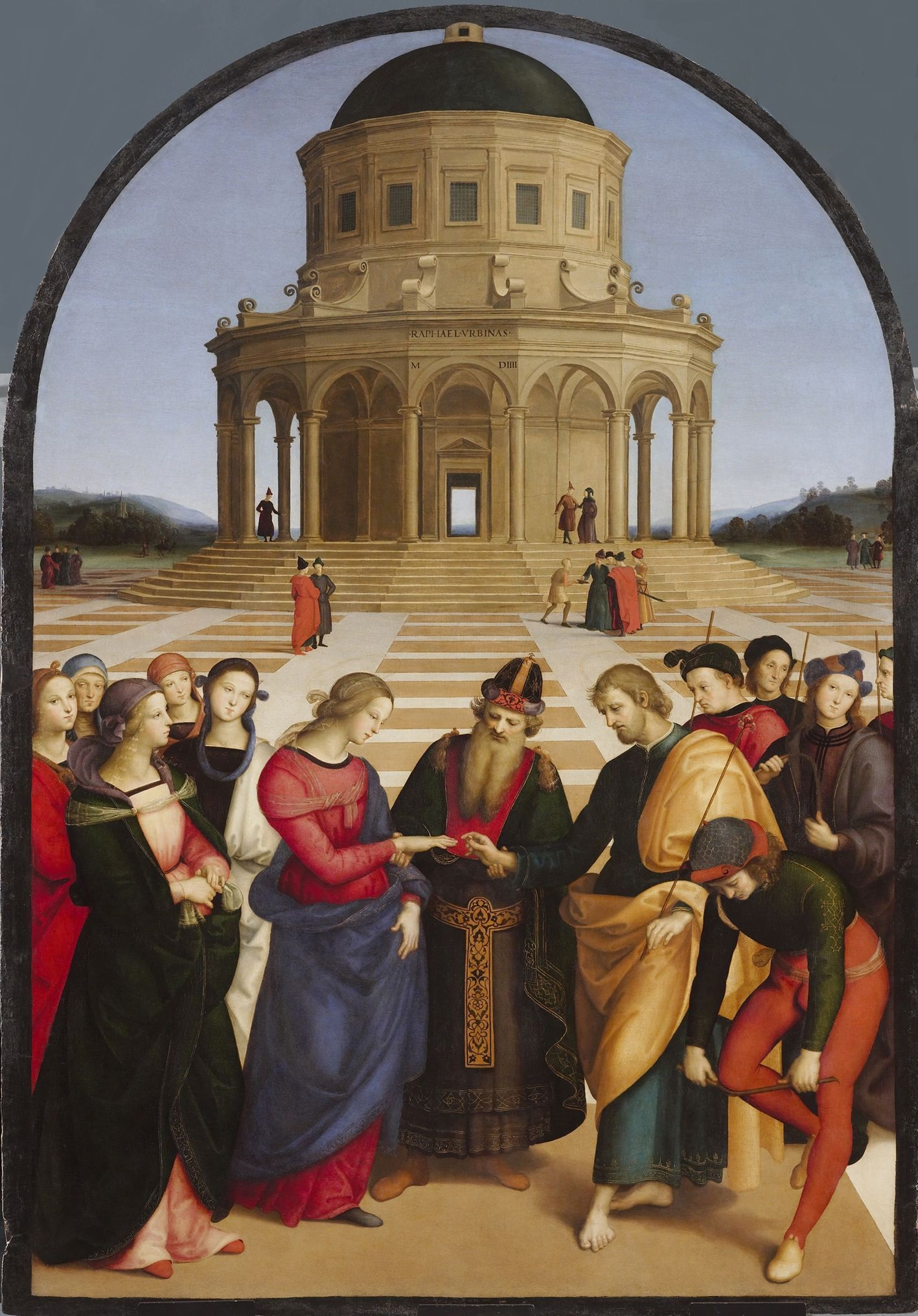
The Temple at Jerusalem in the shape of the Dome of the Rock, as depicted in The Marriage of the Virgin

== See also ==
- History of the Jews in England
- List of former synagogues in the United Kingdom
