= Marie Antoinette (watch) =

1802 case watch designed by Abraham-Louis Breguet

Breguet No 160.
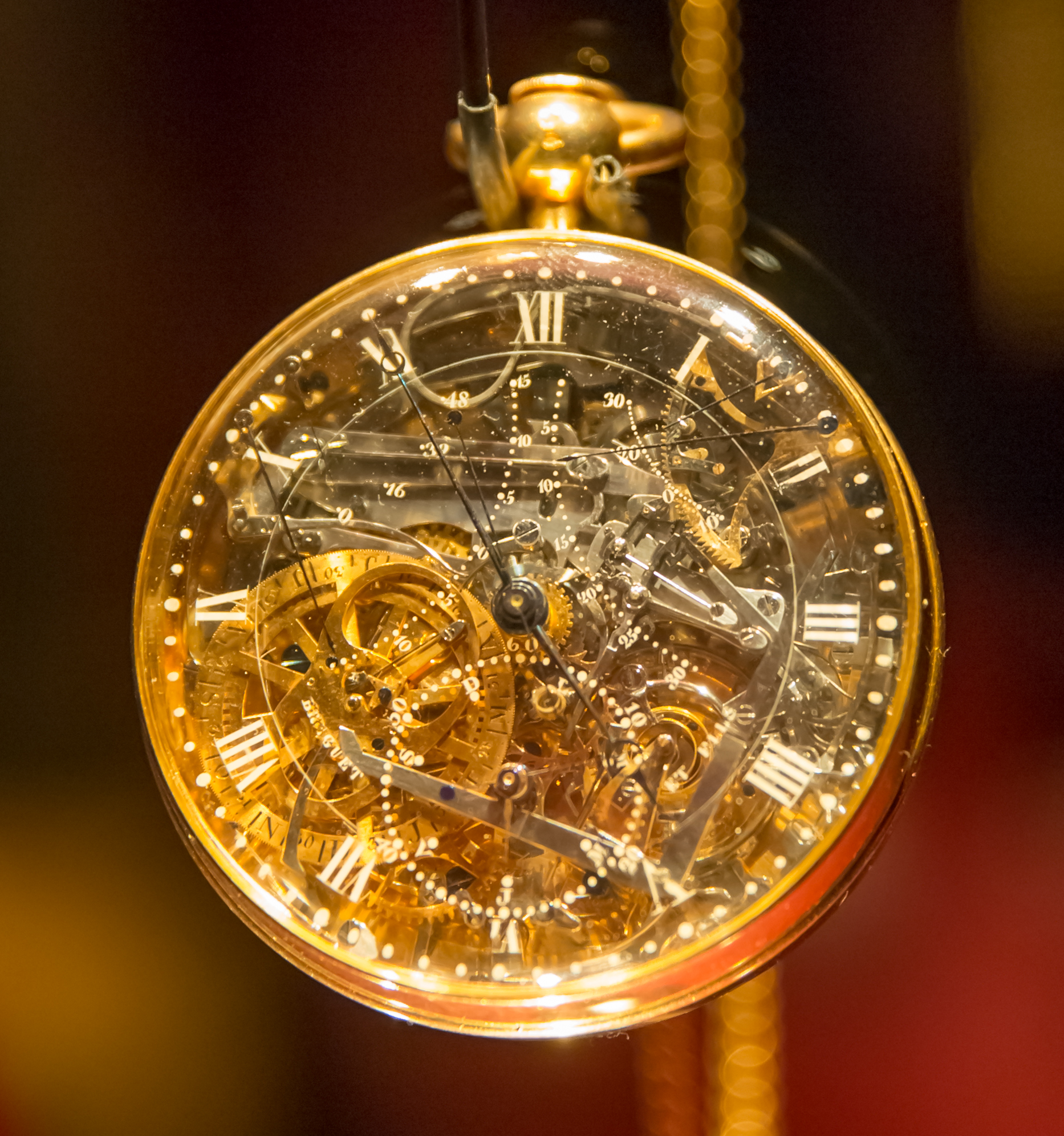
- Type: Mechanical
- Display: Analogue
- Introduced: 1802

The Breguet No. 160 "The Grand Complication," more commonly known as the Marie-Antoinette or the Queen, is a case watch designed by Swiss watchmaker Abraham-Louis Breguet, and was his 160th watch. It has been called 'a poem in clockwork'. The watch is thought to have been commissioned in 1783 by Swedish count Axel von Fersen the Younger, the rumored lover of the French Queen, Marie Antoinette. Work on the watch was begun in 1783 and completed in 1802.

The watch is a central plot point in the novel The Grand Complication by Allen Kurzweil.

== History ==
The watch is thought to have been commissioned in 1783 by an unknown admirer of the French Queen, Marie Antoinette.

It took nineteen years to complete. Marie Antoinette did not live to see the watch, as it was completed 9 years after she was executed. Work stopped for around seven years (1789–1795) during the period of Breguet's exile. It was finally finished in 1802. The "Marie Antoinette" remained in the possession of the Breguet company until it was sold to Sir Spencer Brunton in 1887, eventually finding its way into the collection of Breguet expert Sir David Lionel Salomons in the 1920s.

It was stolen from the L.A. Mayer Institute for Islamic Art on April 17, 1983 along with 105 other rare timepieces from Salomons' collection. The theft was unsolved for 23 years until the police were tipped off by people who reported to have been shown pieces from the collection. It turned out that master-thief Naaman Diller had committed the theft, hiding the watches in safes in the United States, Europe and Israel. After Diller's death, his widow tried to sell the stolen watches and clocks in 2004. She was caught and given 5 years probation for accepting stolen goods. Of the 106 timepieces that were stolen, only 39 were recovered in 2007, including the Marie Antoinette. The watches were returned to the museum in Jerusalem. In 2013, the watch was valued at $30 million.

== Construction ==
The watch is composed of 823 components, and was to contain every watch function known at that time, including the following:

- Clock
- Celestial time
- State of winding
- Perpetual calendar
- Minute repeater
- Thermometer
- Chronograph
- Power reserve
- Pare-Chute (shock protection system, Breguet's own invention)
- Chime
- Automatic winding
- Independent seconds hand

Even by the standards of the day it was an astronomically expensive piece. The most valuable materials (including gold, platinum, rubies and sapphires) were used with no limit placed on time or cost. The watch is encased in gold, with a clear face that shows the complicated movement of the gears inside. Breguet used sapphires in the mechanism to decrease friction.

Breguet company records indicate that the factory costs eventually came to the colossal sum of 30,000 francs. This is more than six times the cost of Breguet's other major work, No. 92, which was sold to the Duc De Preslin for 4800 francs.

== Replica ==
Watchmakers from Breguet, supported by Swatch chairman Nicolas Hayek, were commissioned to make a copy of the watch in 2005. The watch was finished after three years and presented to the public in an oak case, made from Marie-Antoinette's favourite tree in France.

== See also ==
- Patek Philippe Henry Graves Supercomplication
- Patek Philippe Calibre 89
