= Brunswick, Hove =

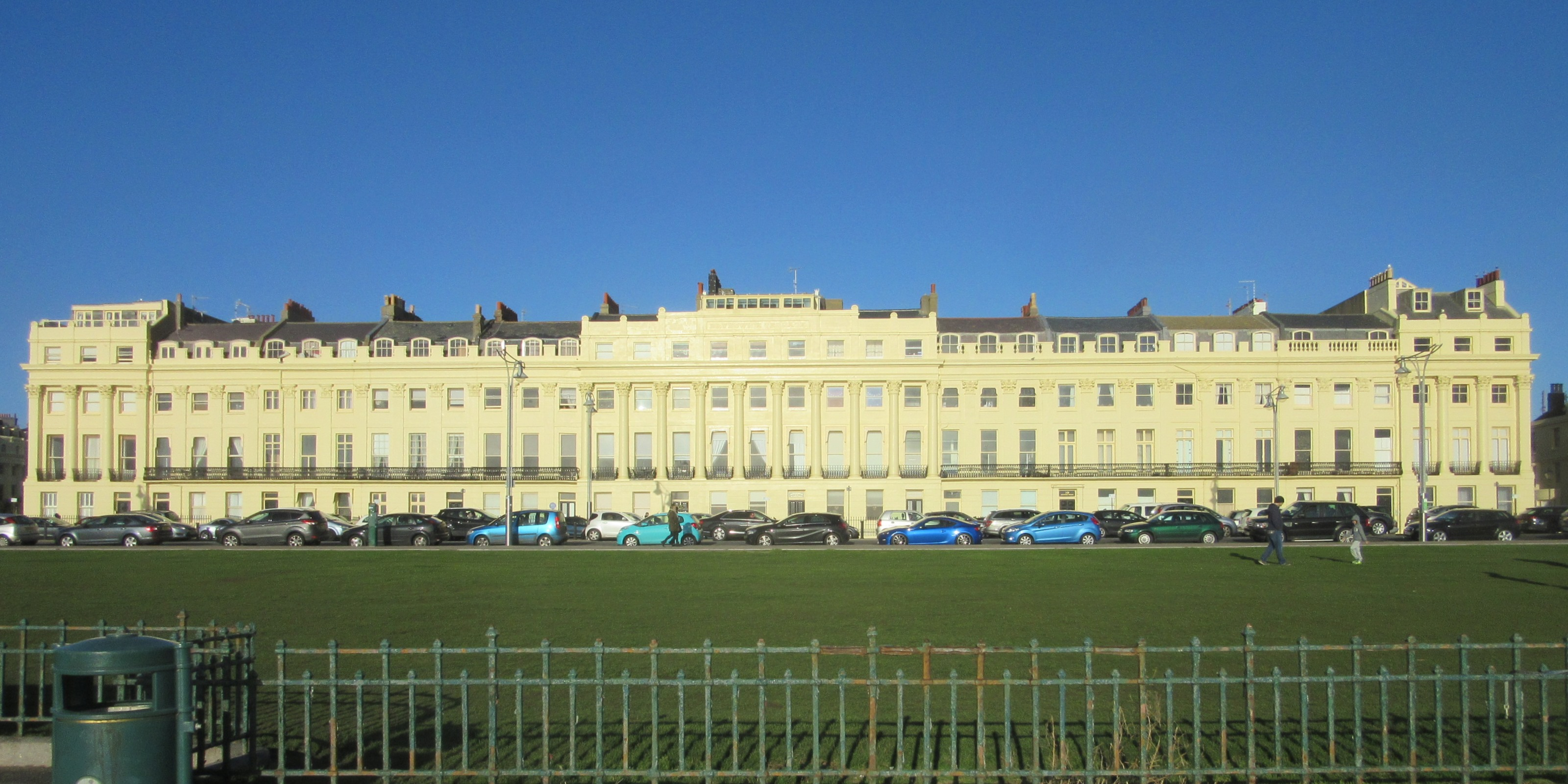
- 7-19 Brunswick Terrace

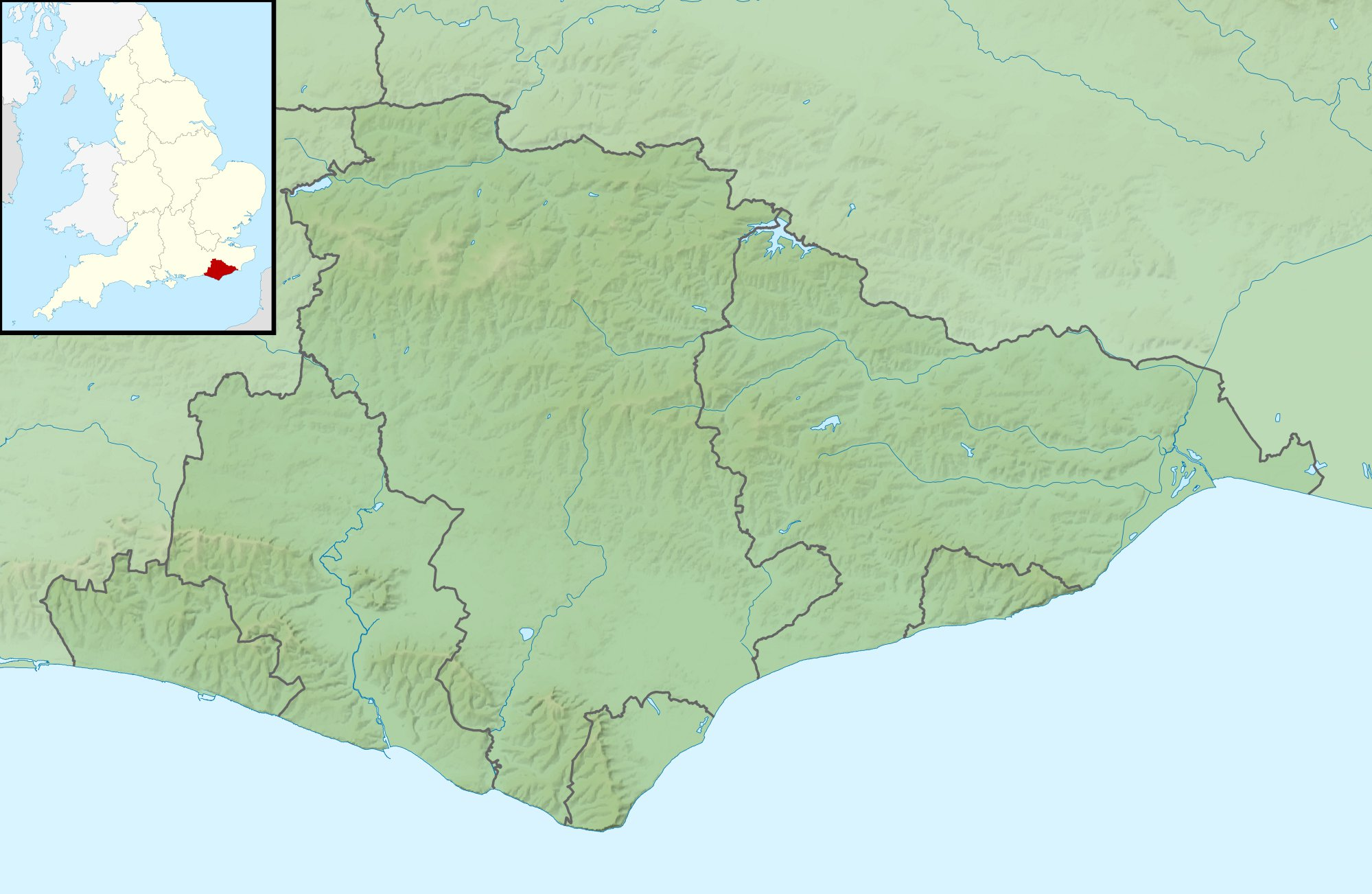
- Location within East Sussex
- 50.8231°N 0.1569°W
- Type: House
- Location: Hove, Brighton and Hove, East Sussex

History
- Built: 1824–1830; 196 years ago

Site notes
- Architect: Charles Busby
- Architectural style: Regency
- Governing body: Privately owned

Listed Building – Grade I
- Official name: Nos 1-6 Brunswick Terrace and attached railings
- Designated: 24 March 1950
- Reference no.: 1204829

Listed Building – Grade I
- Official name: Nos 7-19 Brunswick Terrace and attached railings
- Designated: 24 March 1950
- Reference no.: 1281033

Listed Building – Grade I
- Official name: Nos 20-32 Brunswick Terrace and attached railings
- Designated: 24 March 1950
- Reference no.: 1187546

Listed Building – Grade I
- Official name: Nos 33-42 Brunswick Terrace and attached railings
- Designated: 24 March 1950
- Reference no.: 1204856

Listed Building – Grade I
- Official name: Nos 1-29 Brunswick Square and attached railings
- Designated: 24 March 1950
- Reference no.: 1187544

Brunswick Town is an area in Hove, in the city of Brighton and Hove, England. It is best known for the Regency architecture of the Brunswick estate.

== History ==
Hove Improvement Act 1830
- Act of Parliament
- Parliament of the United Kingdom
- Long title: An Act for paving, lighting, watching, cleansing and otherwise improving Brunswick Square and Brunswick Terrace, and certain Streets and other Public Places upon certain Grounds, late part of a Farm called the Wick Farm, in the Parish of Hove, in the County of Sussex.
- Citation: 11 Geo. 4 & 1 Will. 4. c. xvi)

Dates
- Royal assent: 8 April 1830

Text of statute as originally enacted

Brunswick Square Improvement Extension Act 1851
- Act of Parliament
- Parliament of the United Kingdom
- Long title: An Act to extend the Limits of the Brunswick Square (Hove) Improvement Act, and for other Purposes.
- Citation: 14 & 15 Vict. c. cxl

Dates
- Royal assent: 7 August 1851

Hove Borough Council Act 1976
- Act of Parliament
- Parliament of the United Kingdom
- Long title: An Act to make further provision for preserving uniformity in the exterior of buildings in Brunswick Square, Brunswick Terrace and part of Brunswick Place in the borough of Hove; and for purposes incidental thereto.
- Citation: 1976 c. xv

Dates
- Royal assent: 22 July 1976

Text of statute as originally enacted

Originally, the area had been part of Wick Farm. In the late 18th and early 19th centuries, nearby Brighton had become very fashionable. The Kemp Town estate there had been a success in 1824 architect Charles Busby entered into an agreement to build a similar development on land lying at the extreme east of Hove, adjacent to Brighton. The name "Brunswick" was taken from House of Brunswick, a term sometimes used for the House of Hanover, the name of the British royal family at the time.

Brunswick Town was built as a collaborative project between Busby and the landowner, the Reverend Thomas Scutt. Construction started in 1824. The first houses were completed by 1826. Busby designed Brunswick Town as a long row of terraced houses facing the sea. In the middle point of this sea-facing terrace was a central square, which stretched back. This square was named Brunswick Square. The terraced houses, in Brunswick Terrace and in Brunswick Square, were built for the upper classes, they were designed as 'first-class' housing. Beyond these houses were second-class houses in streets such as Waterloo Street.

The early 20th century saw the area enter decline. At the extreme eastern edge of Brunswick Terrace, on the border of Hove and Brighton, the modernist Embassy Court apartment block was completed in the 1930s, envisaged by local politicians such as Sir Herbert Carden as the beginning of a transformation of the entire seafront, which would have entailed the obliteration of Brunswick Terrace. (Note: Sir Herbert Carden (1867-1941), mayor of Brighton in 1916, was a visionary with pronounced Modernist architectural sympathies. In an essay he authored in 1935, entitled The City Beautiful: A Vision of the New Brighton, he condemned; “the gaunt, basemented houses, badly converted into so-called flats”, damning them as “extremely ugly [with] no pretensions to architecture” and urging their replacement by buildings such as Embassy Court, which “has shown us the way to build for the new age.”) By the late 1940s Brunswick Square itself had become so run-down that the council was considering wholesale demolition and redevelopment with modern housing. These plans encountered strong local opposition, in particular through the founding of the Regency Society which fought successfully against the plans.

In the late 1990s the top of Brunswick Square, where it meets busy Western Road, was closed to motor traffic, changing the nature of the square from a through route to a residential area. Embassy Court was also renovated, having fallen into decay.

== Notable residents ==
Brunswick Square and Brunswick Terrace have had a large number of prominent residents.

- Henry Brougham, 1st Baron Brougham and Vaux
- James Brudenell, 7th Earl of Cardigan
- Roger Quilter, composer
- John Horace Round, historian
- Robin Maugham, writer
- Robert Bevan, artist
- Philip Salomons, financier, who built a Roof-top synagogue at 26 Brunswick Terrace
- Admiral Sir George Augustus Westphal, served in over 100 actions and wounded at Trafalgar on HMS Victory lived at No 2 Brunswick Square 1836-1875
- Sir Winston Churchill was schooled in Hove in the Brunswick area between 1883 and 1885.
- Edward Carpenter, English socialist poet, socialist philosopher, anthologist, and early gay activist
- Nick Tyson, the curator of The Regency Town House, a heritage centre at No.13

== Politics ==
Brunswick is currently part of the local council's Brunswick & Adelaide ward which is represented by Andrei Czolak of Labour and Ollie Sykes of the Green Party. Sykes previously represented the ward for eight years until he stepped down in 2019. In July 2024 he replaced Labour councillor Jilly Stevens, who stepped down due to ill health.

== Culture ==
The Brunswick Festival takes place each year, centred on Brunswick Square. The Old Market, built in 1828 to serve Brunswick Town, was restored in 1999 and is used as a theatre.

=== Listing designations ===
Many of the buildings in the area are listed by Historic England. (Note: Historic England is the statutory body with responsibility for the listing of buildings in England. It uses a tiered rating system, classifying listed buildings into one of three categories; Grade I, the highest grade, for buildings of “exceptional interest”, Grade II*, the next grade, for buildings of “more than special interest”, and Grade II, the lowest grade, for buildings of “special interest”.) Some are listed at the highest grade, Grade I. These include the four components of Brunswick Terrace; Nos 1-6, Nos 7-19, Nos 20-32, and Nos 33-42; the East, and West sides of Brunswick Square, and the Church of St Andrew.

== Gallery ==
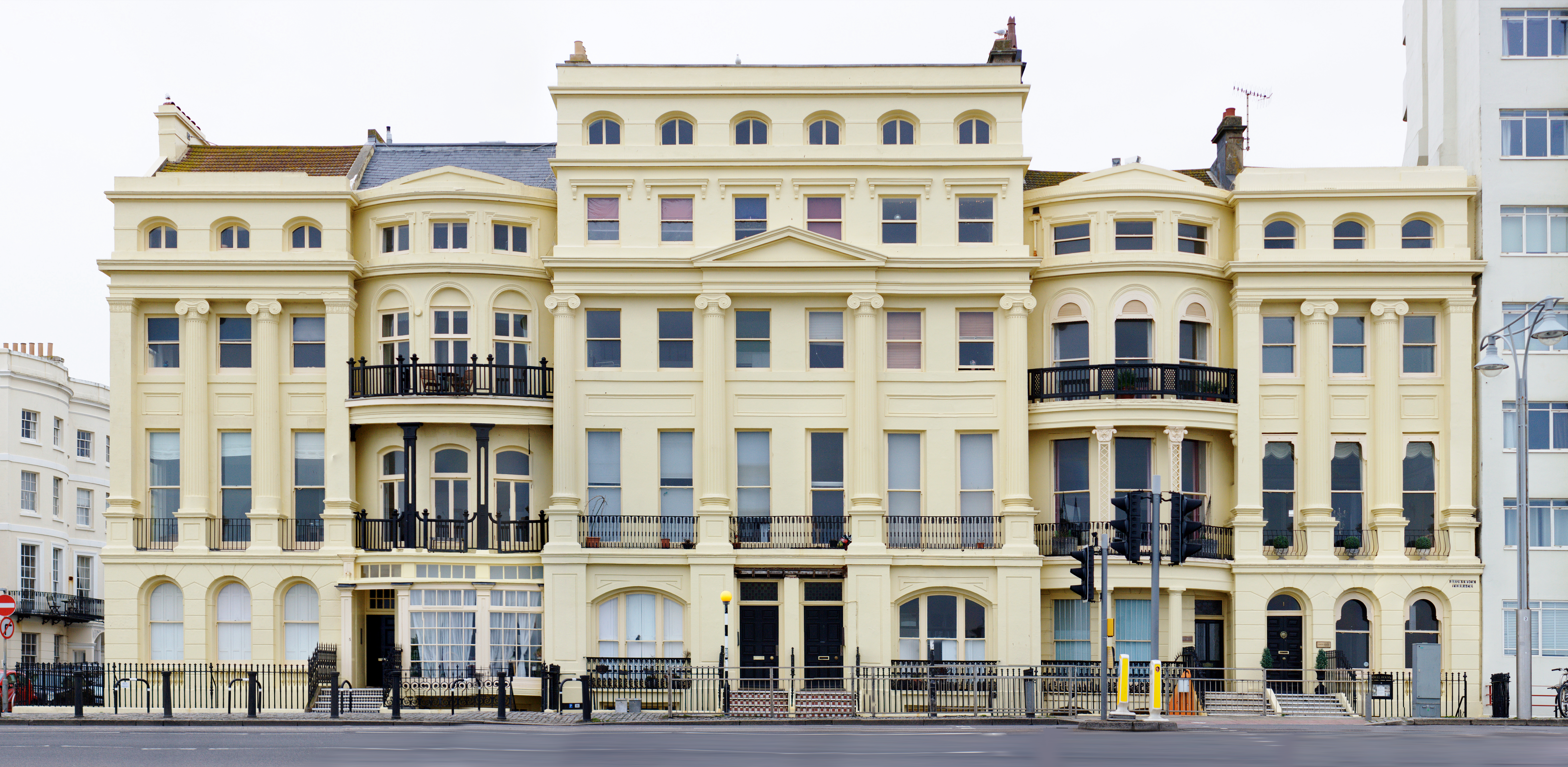
1-6 Brunswick Terrace

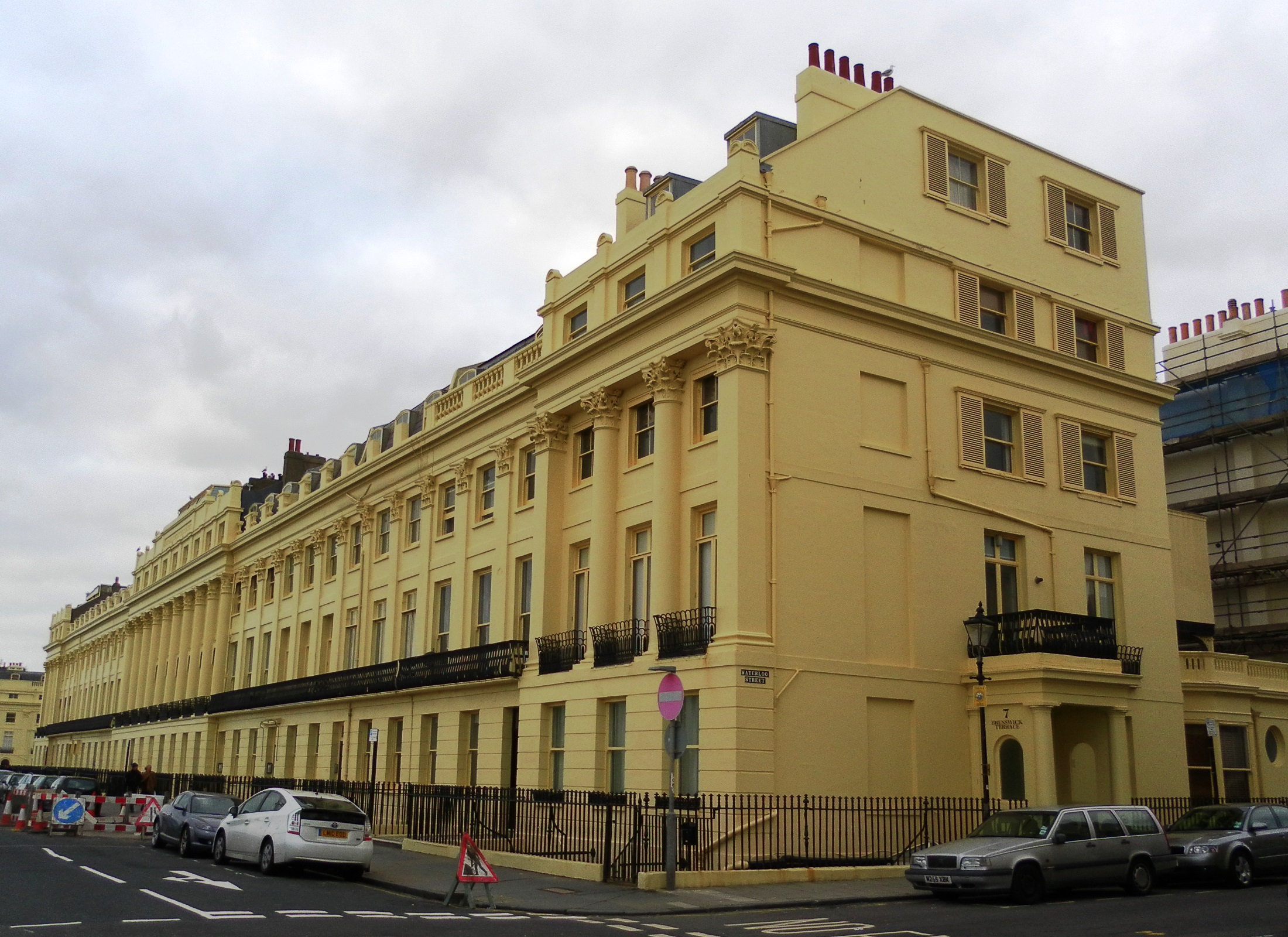
7-19 Brunswick Terrace

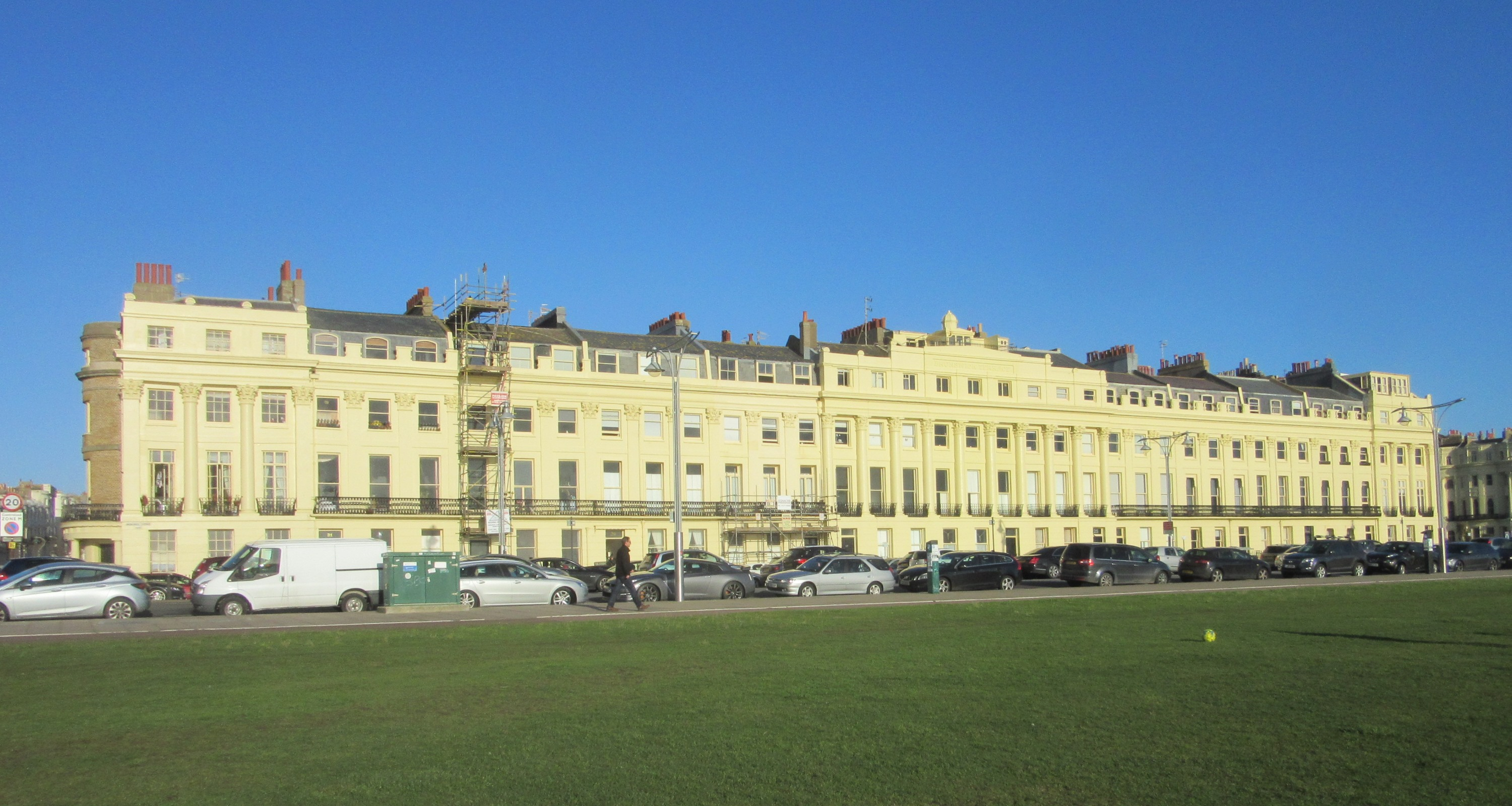
20–32 Brunswick Terrace

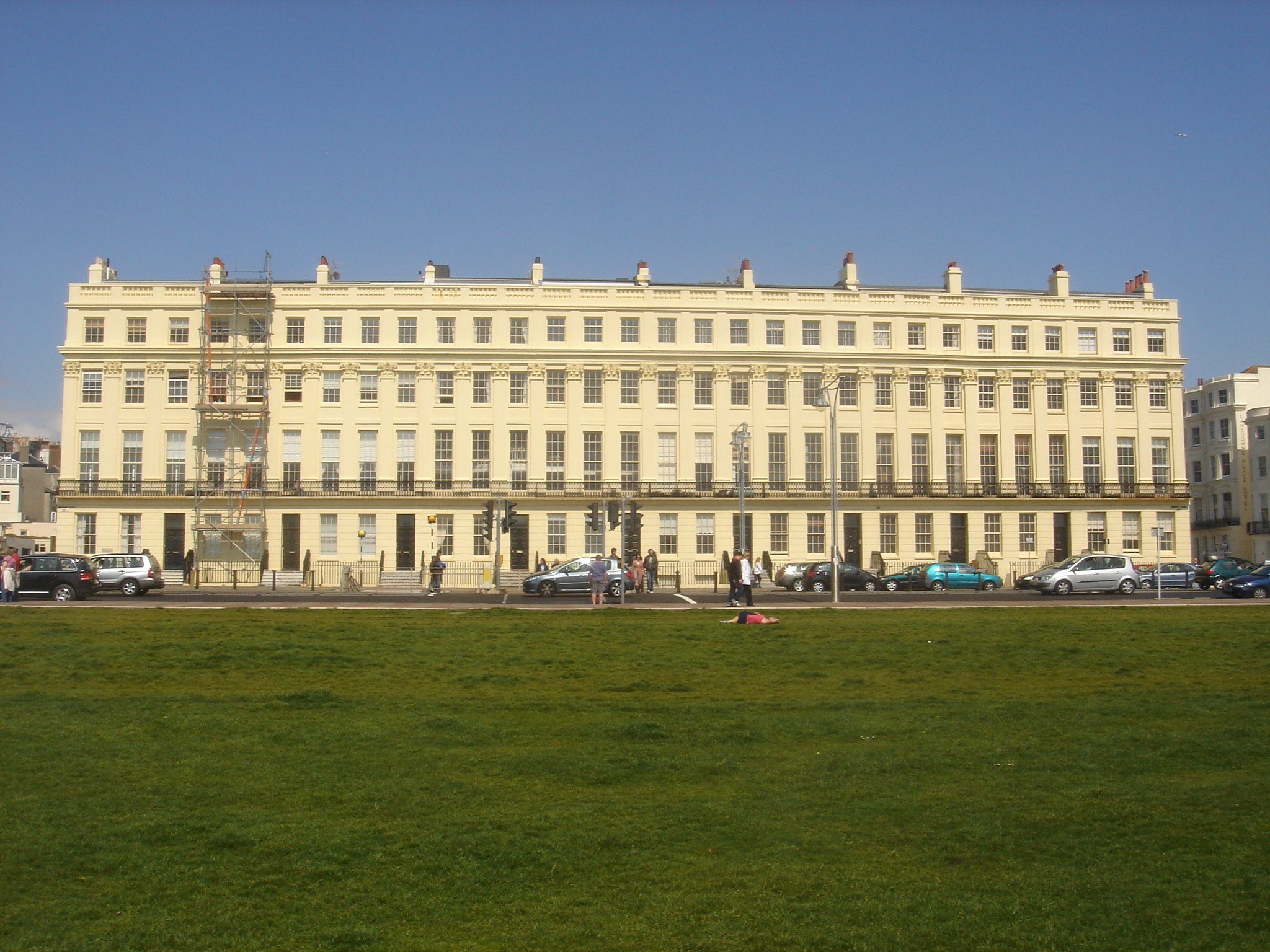
33–42 Brunswick Terrace

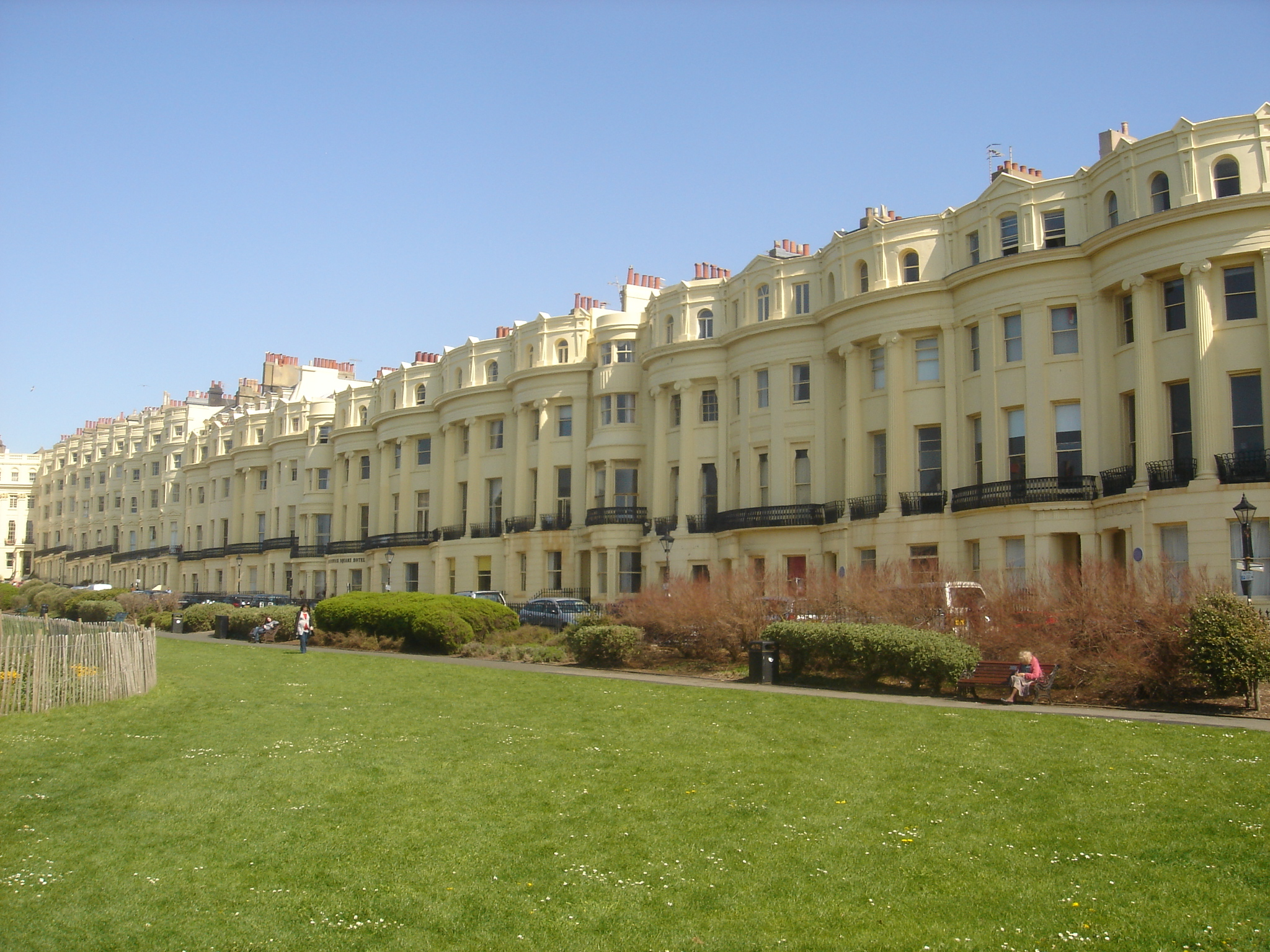
Brunswick Square, East side

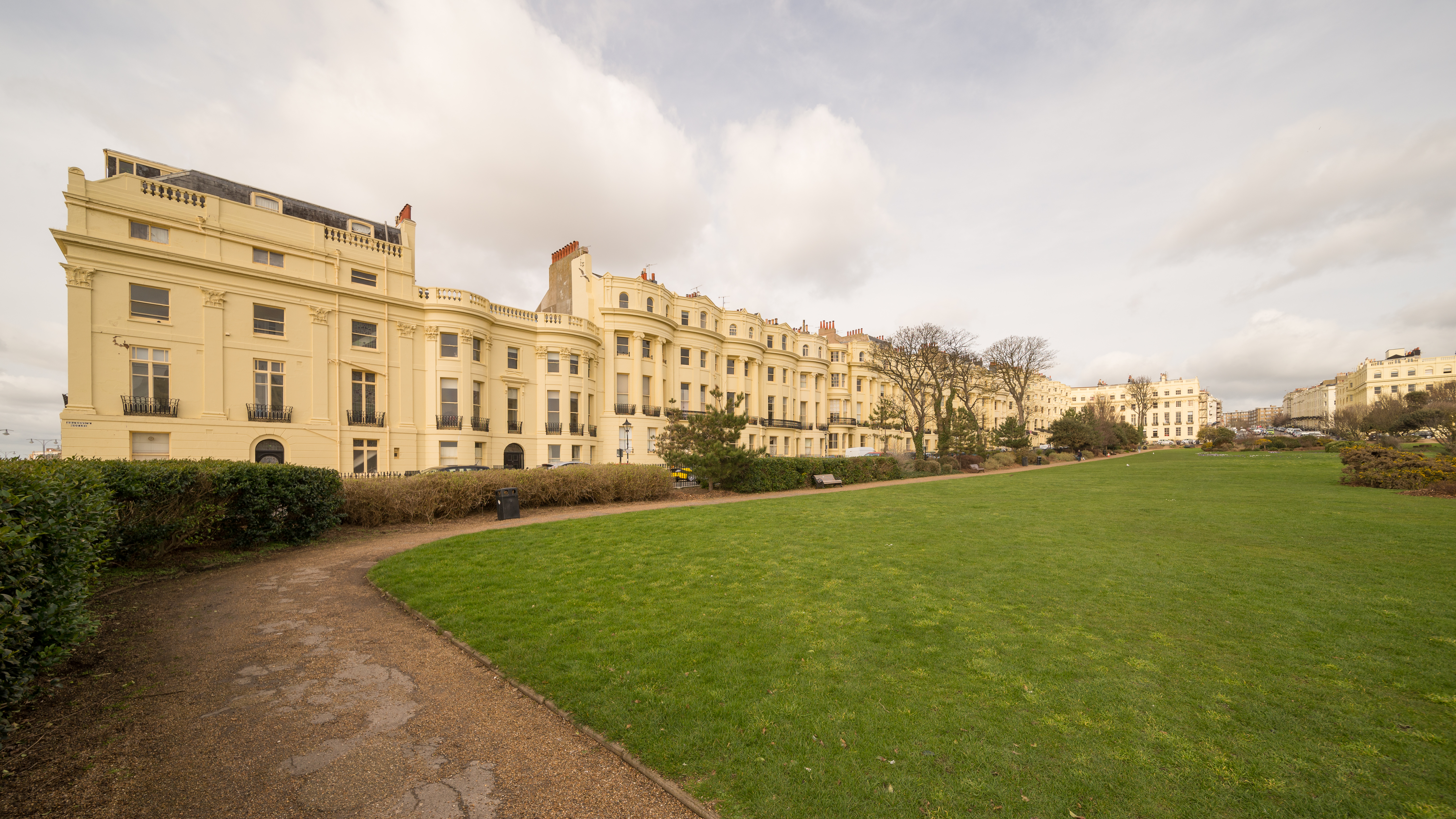
Brunswick Square, West side

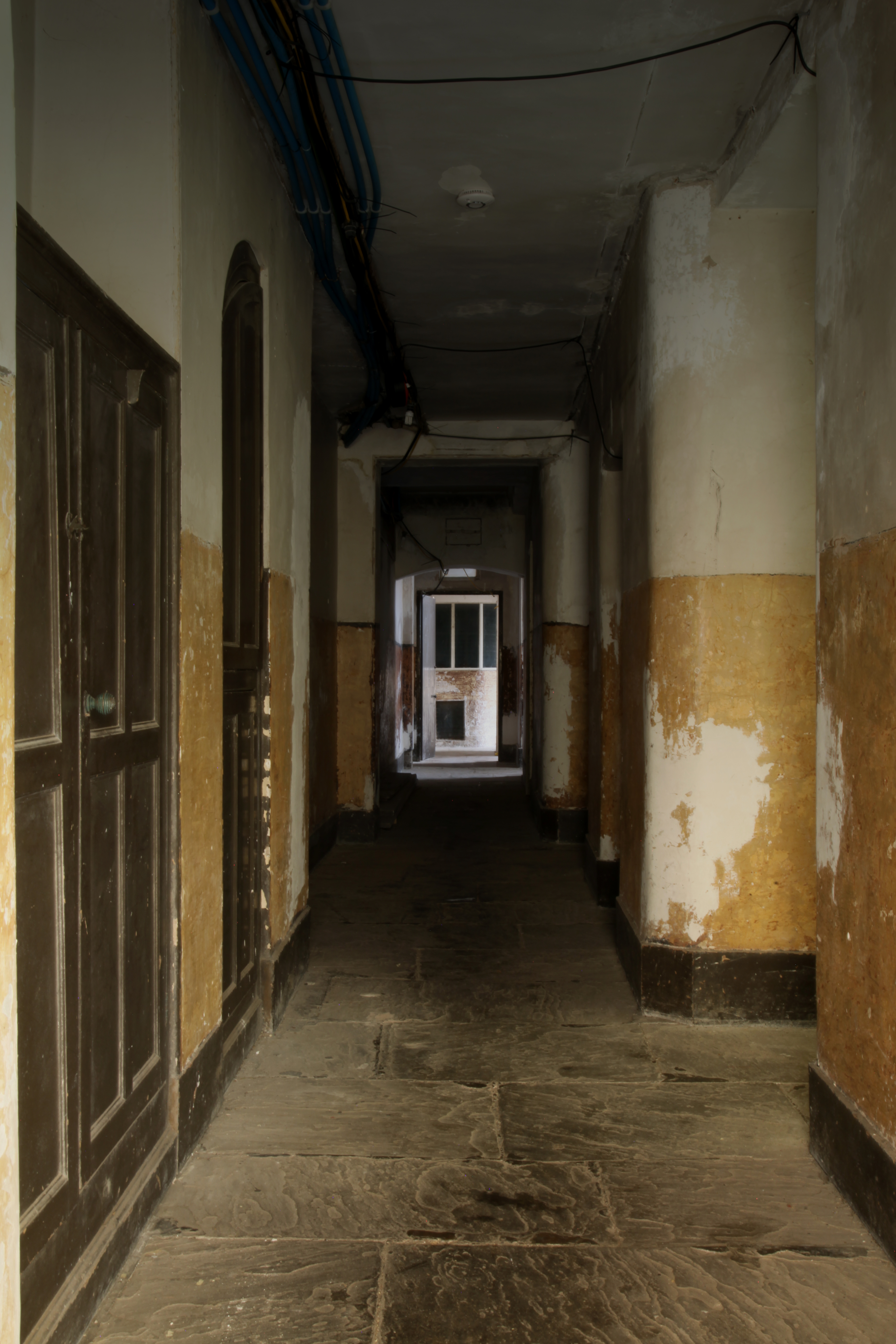
The basement of 10 Brunswick Square. This is part of Regency Town House

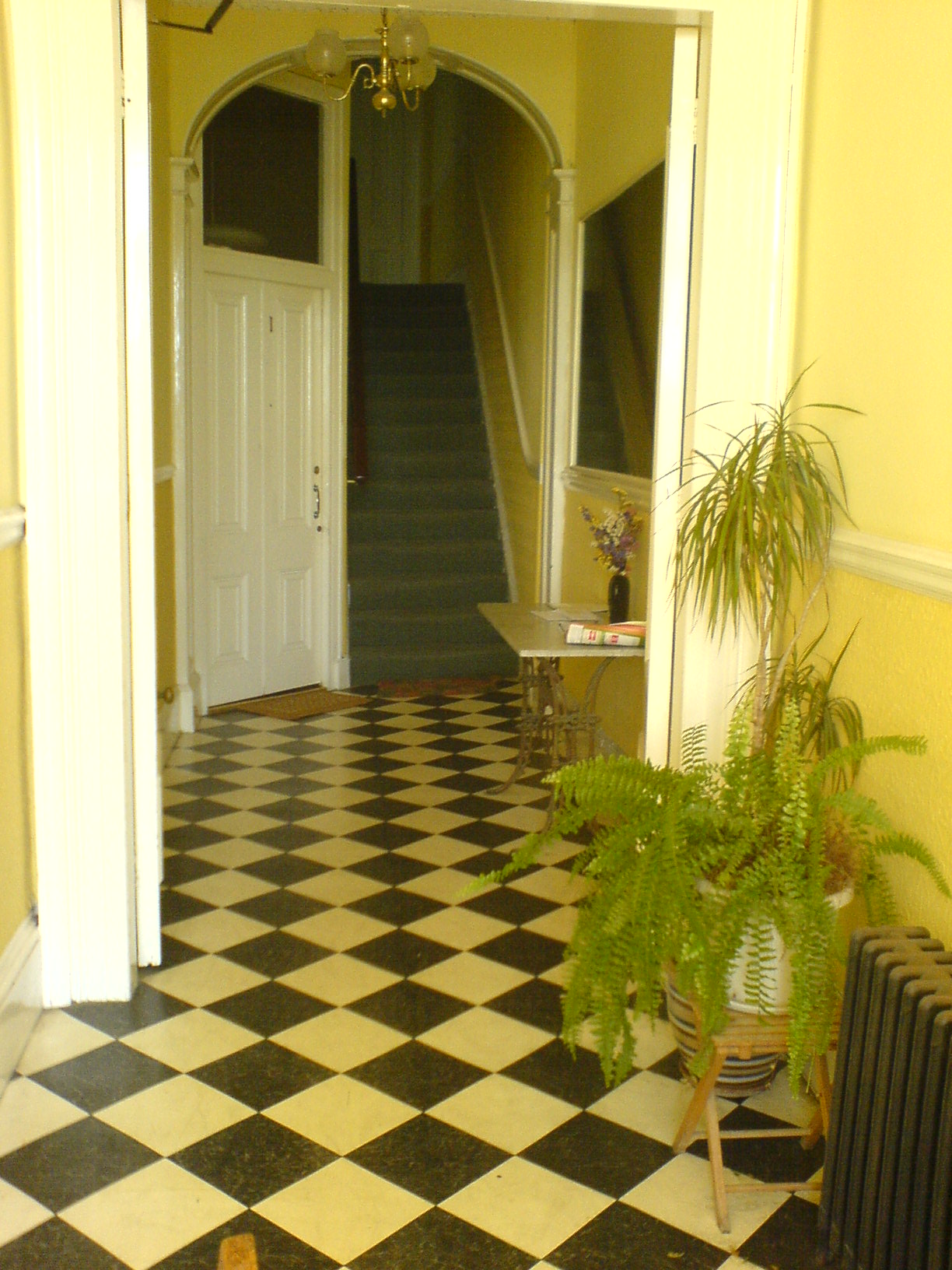
Typical entrance hallway to a Brunswick house converted to flats

== See also ==
- Landmarks and notable buildings of Brighton and Hove

== Sources ==
- Antram, Nicholas; Morrice, Richard (2008). Brighton and Hove. Pevsner Architectural Guides. New Haven, US and London: Yale University Press. ISBN 978-0-300-12661-7.
- Antram, Nicholas; Pevsner, Nikolaus (2013). Sussex: East. Pevsner Buildings of England. New Haven, US and London: Yale University Press. ISBN 978-0-300-18473-0.
- Bingham, Neil (1991). C.A. Busby: The Regency Architect of Brighton and Hove. London: RIBA Heinz Gallery. ISBN 978-1-872-91110-6.
- Binney, Marcus (1998). Town Houses - Evolution and Innovation in 800 years of Urban Domestic Architecture. London: Mitchell Beazley. ISBN 978-1-840-00029-0.
