= Naaman Diller =

Israeli burglar

Naaman Diller (later known as Naaman Lidor) was an Israeli burglar best known for the 1983 theft of 106 rare clocks and watches from the L. A. Mayer Museum for Islamic Art in Jerusalem, a case often described as the largest art robbery in Israel's history.

== Background ==
Diller was a former air force pilot. He became known in the 1960s and 1970s for inventive, technically skilled burglaries and forgery. Among his most famous crimes was a 1967 Tel Aviv bank robbery that he prepared for months, using an improvised 300-foot pipeline to feed oxygen to a cutting torch as he penetrated the vault and opened safe-deposit boxes methodically over several days. When he made the preparations, the Six Day War started; Diller paused the robbery preparations and returned to the army for the duration of the war. When he entered the bank, "he had as much loot as he could carry, he took it home, took a shower, then returned to get more". He was caught only when he started to bang on the safe door, frustrated that he couldn't crack it. A neighbor heard the noise and called the police.

== 1983 Museum for Islamic Art heist ==
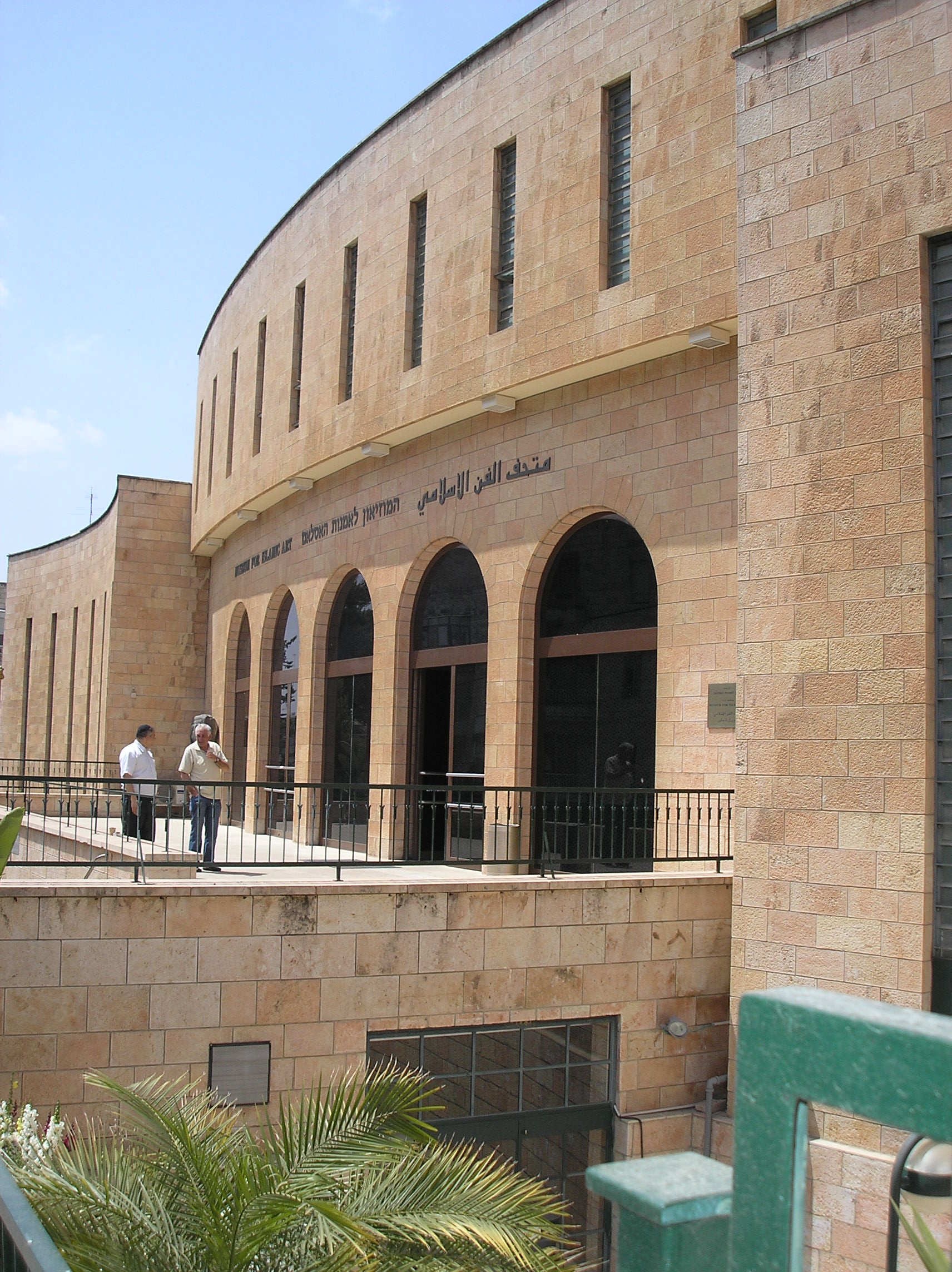
Museum for Islamic Art

On the night of 15–16 April 1983, Diller entered the L. A. Mayer Museum for Islamic Art and removed 106 timepieces, including a number of major works by Abraham-Louis Breguet and other rare items. Among them was the famous Breguet pocket watch commissioned for Marie Antoinette, sometimes nicknamed “the Queen” and often described as one of the most valuable watches in the world. The burglar exploited multiple weaknesses—an inoperative alarm and predictable guard routine—slipping through a small barred window after bending its metal with tools, then shuttling items out to a waiting vehicle. Several larger pieces were dismantled to fit through the opening.

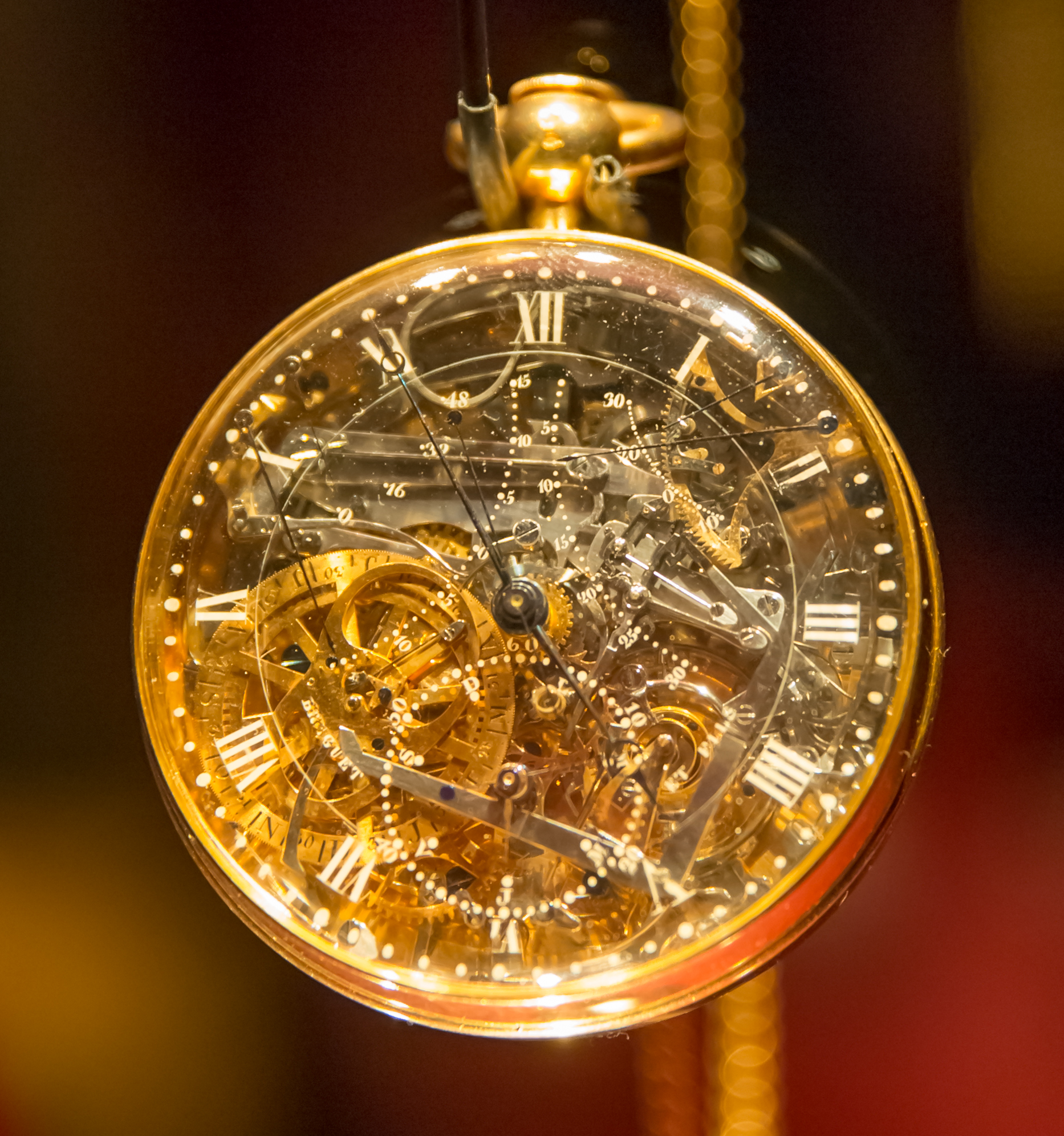
The Marie Antoinette Watch

Despite international attention, the case was unsolved for more than two decades. In August 2006 a lawyer, acting for an anonymous woman, approached the museum and arranged the return of 39 items—including the Marie Antoinette watch—in exchange for a payment reported as roughly US$35,000 by one account and about US$40,000 by another. Police scrutiny of the returned pieces and the intermediaries led investigators to identify the woman as Nili Shamrat, an Israeli expatriate living in Los Angeles. She was Diller's widow and had come into possession of some of the stolen collection after his death.

It is believed that Diller robbed the museum not for the money, but for the "thrill" of robbery. He sold only 3 out of 106 stolen watches.

"Luckily for us, Diller was so passionate about the watches that he kept each of the tiny pieces in perfect condition," Hasson told the Financial Times in 2009. “We found meticulous notes Diller wrote about each component and mechanism … on scraps of paper, toilet paper and old boxes."

Following this break, authorities reconstructed the method of the burglary and concluded that Diller had acted alone, forging documents to create a false alibi that placed him outside Israel at the time. In total, authorities recovered 96 of the 106 stolen timepieces. The museum later restored damaged objects and re-opened the Salomons clock gallery to the public in July 2009.

The 1983 heist, sometimes referred to as the "Great Clock Robbery", remains a landmark case in Israeli history. It prompted changes in museum security practices in Israel, and the restored display has since been used by the museum to narrate the investigation and recovery to visitors.

== Death ==
Diller died of cancer in 2004; before his death he told his wife that he had carried out the museum theft and left the remaining stolen items to her, some of which were stored in safes in Israel, Europe and the United States.
