= Philip Salomons =

English financier, Jewish leader and High Sheriff of Sussex

- Born: 1796; London, U.K.
- Died: 1867 (aged 70–71); London, U.K.
- Resting place: West Ham Jewish Cemetery
- Occupation: Banker
- Spouse: Emma Abigail Montefiore
- Children: David Lionel Salomons

Philip Salomons (1796–1867) was an English financier, Jewish leader and High Sheriff of Sussex.

== Early life ==
Philip Salomons was born in London in 1796. He travelled extensively in the United States as a young man, and became a naturalized American citizen in 1826. Later that year, however, he returned to England and resumed his British citizenship. His father was a financier in the City of London, as was his brother, Sir David Salomons (1797–1873).

== Career ==
Salomons became a financier in the City of London.

== Judaism ==
Salomons followed his father as Warden of London's New Synagogue in 1843. He succeeded his brother as a representative on the Board of Deputies of British Jews. A devout man, he had his own private Roof-top synagogue on top of his Hove home. He was a noted collector of antique Judaica. The Tablets of the Ten Commandments from the synagogue are preserved in the collection of the Salomons Museum in Tunbridge Wells.

== Public office ==
Salomons served as Justice of the Peace, High Sheriff of Sussex (1852) and Deputy Lieutenant of the county.

== Personal life ==
Salomons married Emma Abigail Montefiore (1833–1859) in 1850 when he was 54 and she was 17. She died aged 26 and he died eight years later; their children were reared by Sir David Salomons. The couple are buried in the West Ham Jewish Cemetery. They had a son, Sir David Lionel Salomons (1851–1925).
