= Regency Town House =

The Regency Town House
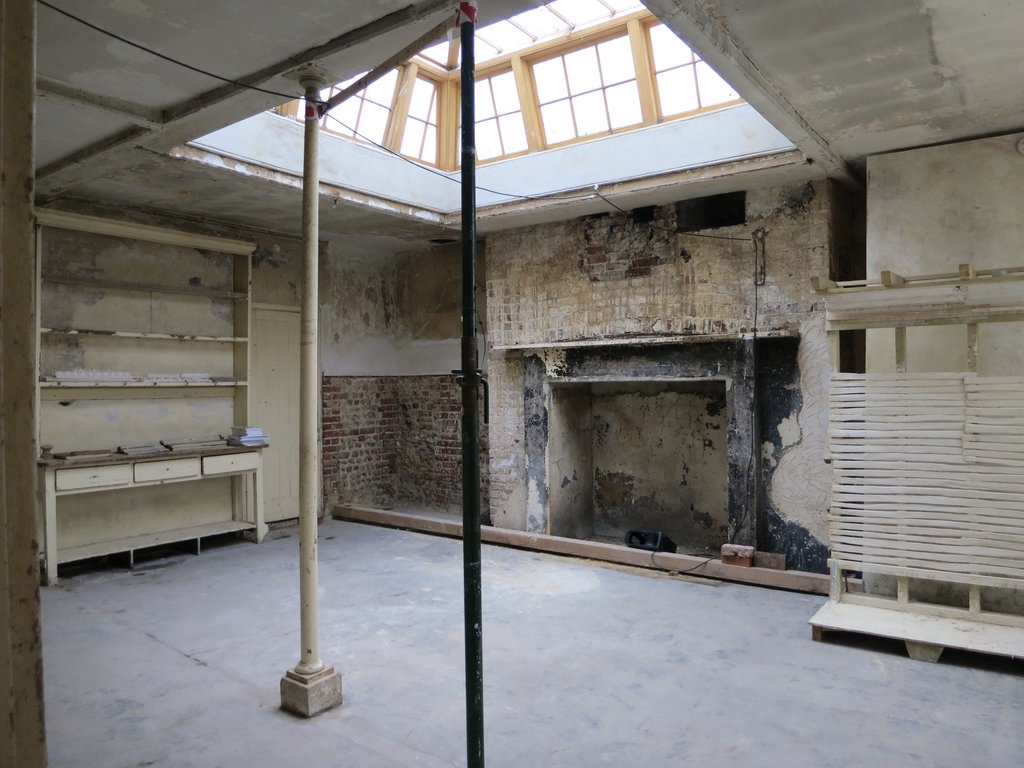
- The old kitchen at 10 Brunswick Square. It is part of The Regency Town House at 13 Brunswick Square. The kitchen is virtually untouched by time.

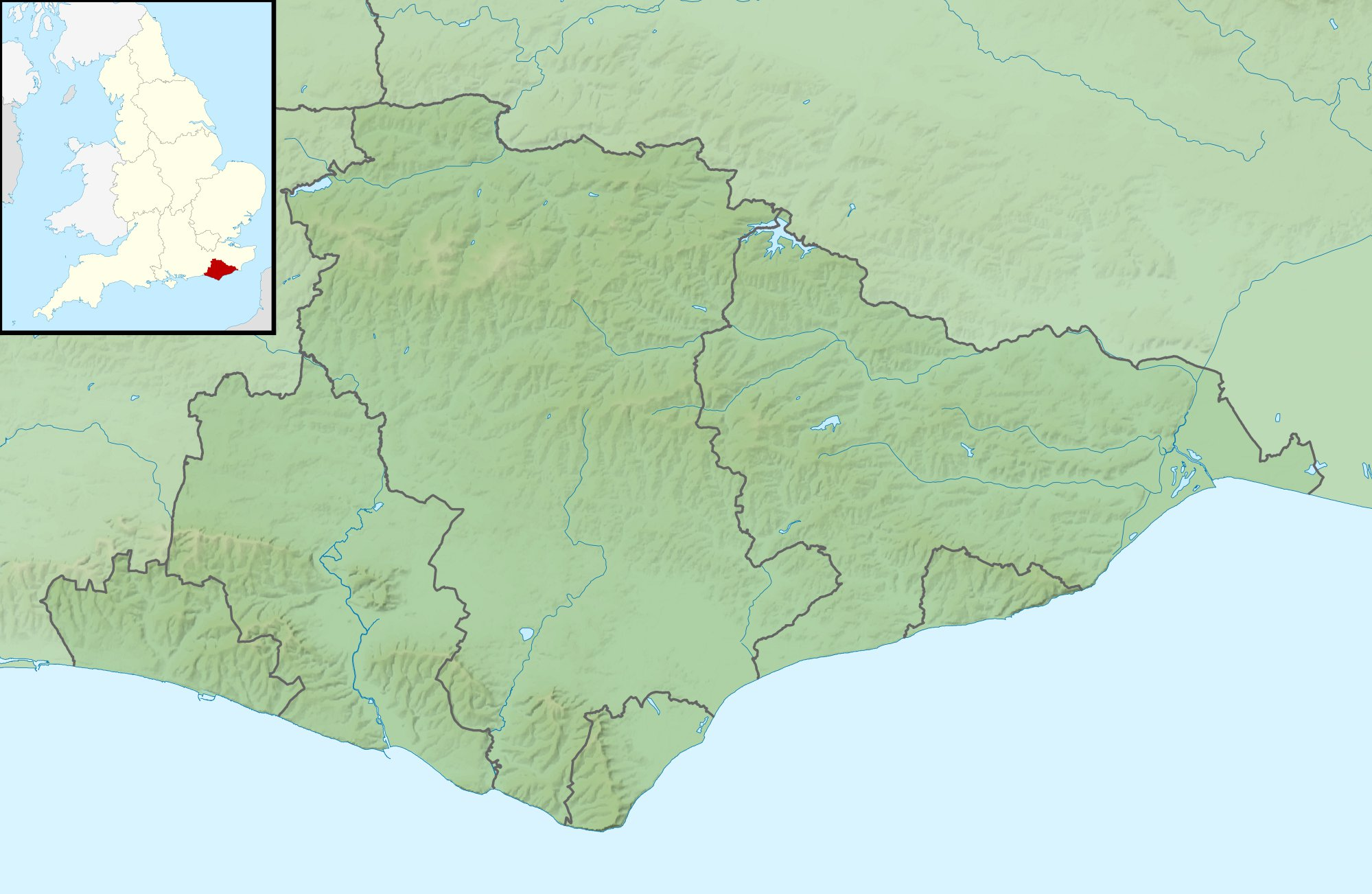
- Location within East Sussex

General information
- Status: Completed
- Type: Townhouse
- Architectural style: Regency
- Location: Brunswick Square, Brunswick, an area of Hove in Brighton & Hove, East Sussex, England, United Kingdom
- Coordinates: 50°49′28″N 0°09′30″W
- Completed: 1820; 206 years ago
- Owner: Nick Tyson

Design and construction
- Designations: Grade I listed

Renovating team
- Other designers: Nick Tyson

The Regency Town House is a Grade I listed historic town house, now a museum, in Brunswick, an area of Hove in Brighton & Hove, East Sussex, England. The Regency Town House is located at 13 Brunswick Square near the beach in Hove. Brunswick Square forms part of Brunswick Town. The house was built in the 1820s. It was designed in the Regency architectural style by Charles Augustin Busby.

The house is being restored by a team headed by Nick Tyson, a curator. Two full-time members of staff are performing the restoration with a team of volunteers. They hope to transform the building into a museum and heritage centre.

== Description ==
The Regency Town House has a dining room and a parlour on the ground floor. On the half-landing, there is a waiting room and a water closet. On the first floor are the drawing rooms. These rooms could be used separately, by using folding doors, or as one large party space. The upper storeys had bedrooms, these rooms now house the offices of the project. The basement was where the servants worked, with access from the front area and also behind through the stables.

A part of The Regency Town House project is located at 10 Brunswick Square. This is the last intact basement in the Square. It provides an insight into servant life. Visitors can walk down the stairs from the street to a front basement area that has a stone-flagged floor. There is a coal cellar under the street which would have provided the fuel for the fireplaces upstairs. Next to the coal cellar is a beer cellar. The first right on the right is the housekeeper's room, next to this is the wine cellar. It has double doors, the second is iron-lined. This acts as an extra precaution again theft from servants. Next is a servant's hall. Large in this house as there would have been 8-12 servants. The room overlooks a small courtyard. On the other side of this courtyard is the kitchen. It has a large skylight and it's said that its layout was influenced by the Prince Regent's famous kitchen at the Brighton Pavilion.

== Restoration project ==
In 1984 Nick Tyson, the owner decided to reassemble a whole 1829 terraced house in Hove's Brunswick Square. He first bought the basement flat. Then he bought the remaining flats as the other tenants left. He plans to restore the building as authentically as possible. Every detail will be restored authentically. It will be opened to the public. The period craftsmanship will be showcased this way.

Nick Tyson founded the Town House project in the 1980s. After he discovered Regency-style architecture in the United States, he observed that Brighton and Hove's historic buildings were being converted with little care and attention, which concerned him. Tyson and his partner at the time bought the lease of an uninhabitable basement flat at 13 Brunswick Square and decided to take a year out to restore it before returning to the United States. However, leases of the other flats began to become available and Tyson could see the possibility of putting the house back together again. The building started as flats and is now a complete house again.

In 1992 the Brunswick Town Charitable trust appealed to Brighton and Hove residents to help find fireplaces for the drawing room and a ceiling rose for the dining room that it hoped artists could replicate. The Trust's spokeswoman at the time said that they were 'at a standstill and not sure where to turn'. The plan was to photograph original fire places and ceiling roses and then to copy them for the Town House.

The restoration work uses traditional techniques and materials where it is possible to do so. The Town House is being returned to its former glory with the help of a team of volunteers. It is being slowly restored. Every tour and event which raises money means funds for more restoration.

Layers of peeling paint have been removed. The mouldings and plasterwork had been repaired by experts in plasterwork. Analysis was carried out on finishes that were original to the property by paint expert Patrick Baty. This information will be used to recreate decoration in other parts of the project. The goal of the Town House project is to offer complete access to all rooms in the house. The project would like the rooms to appear to as guests as they would have when the house was first occupied.

Regular fundraising activities including Dine Like a Servant are held to support restoration of the townhouses. The townhouses are also an exhibition venue and in 2018 held an exhibition by the artist Suzanne O‘Haire.

== Funding ==
On 17 December 2020 The Regency Town House was awarded an Art Fund Grant.

Councillor Mac Cafferty, representing Brunswick and Adelaide Ward at the time, commented:

"It’s a fitting tribute to the team of enthusiastic and dedicated volunteers, headed up by the tireless Nick Tyson, who have worked so hard to bring this project to life. The funding will provide a lifeline for the house which, like museums and art galleries across the country, has been severely affected by the current Covid crisis. The Regency Town House plays a crucial role in understanding the history of our city, as well as providing a unique and much-loved arts venue."

== In media ==
The house was used as a filming location for the 2022 romantic film My Policeman.

== Gallery ==
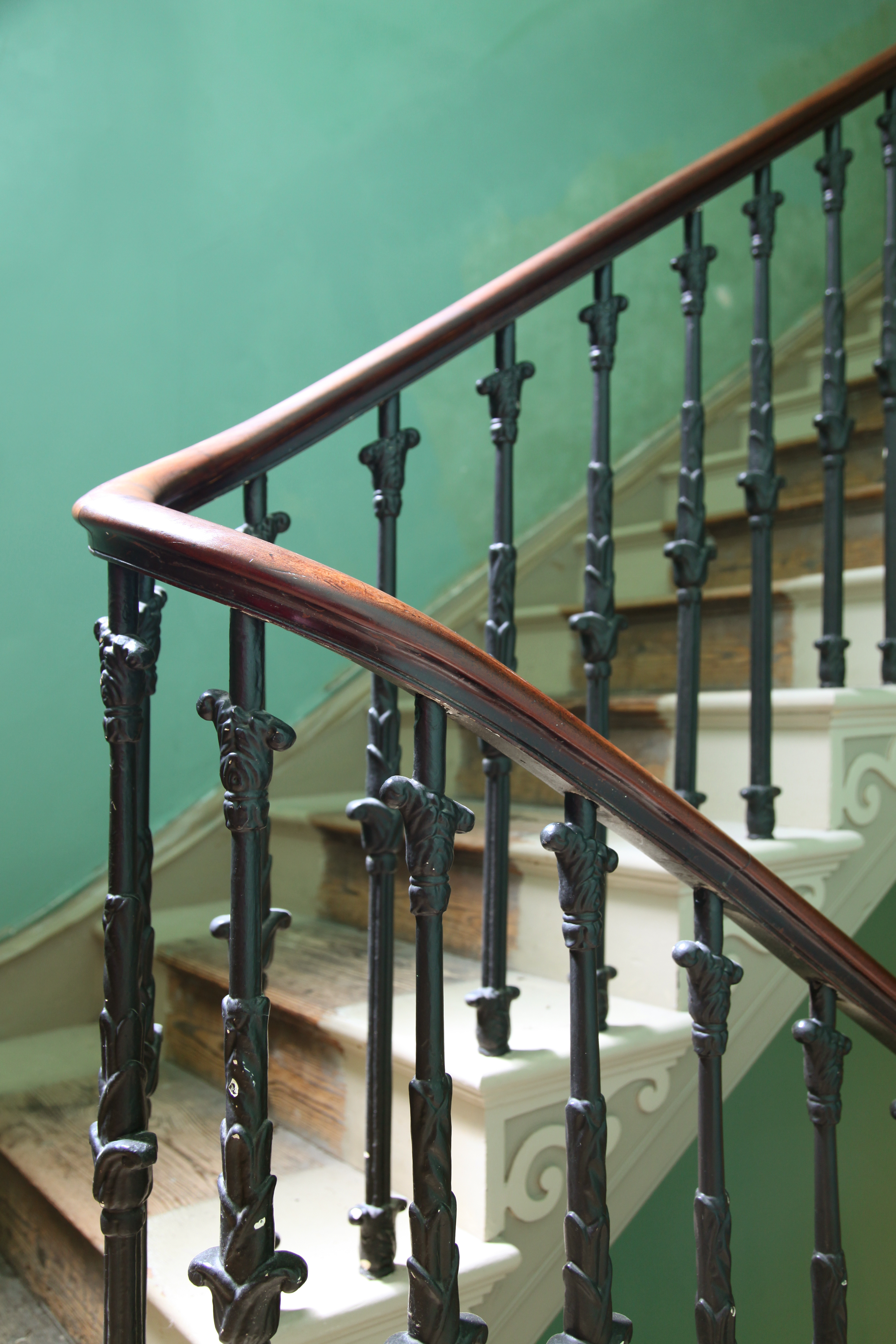
Main staircase. The staircase goes not just to the first floor but to the top of the house. It has iron balustrades, these are a feature of many Regency homes in Brighton. Brighton produced much cast iron.

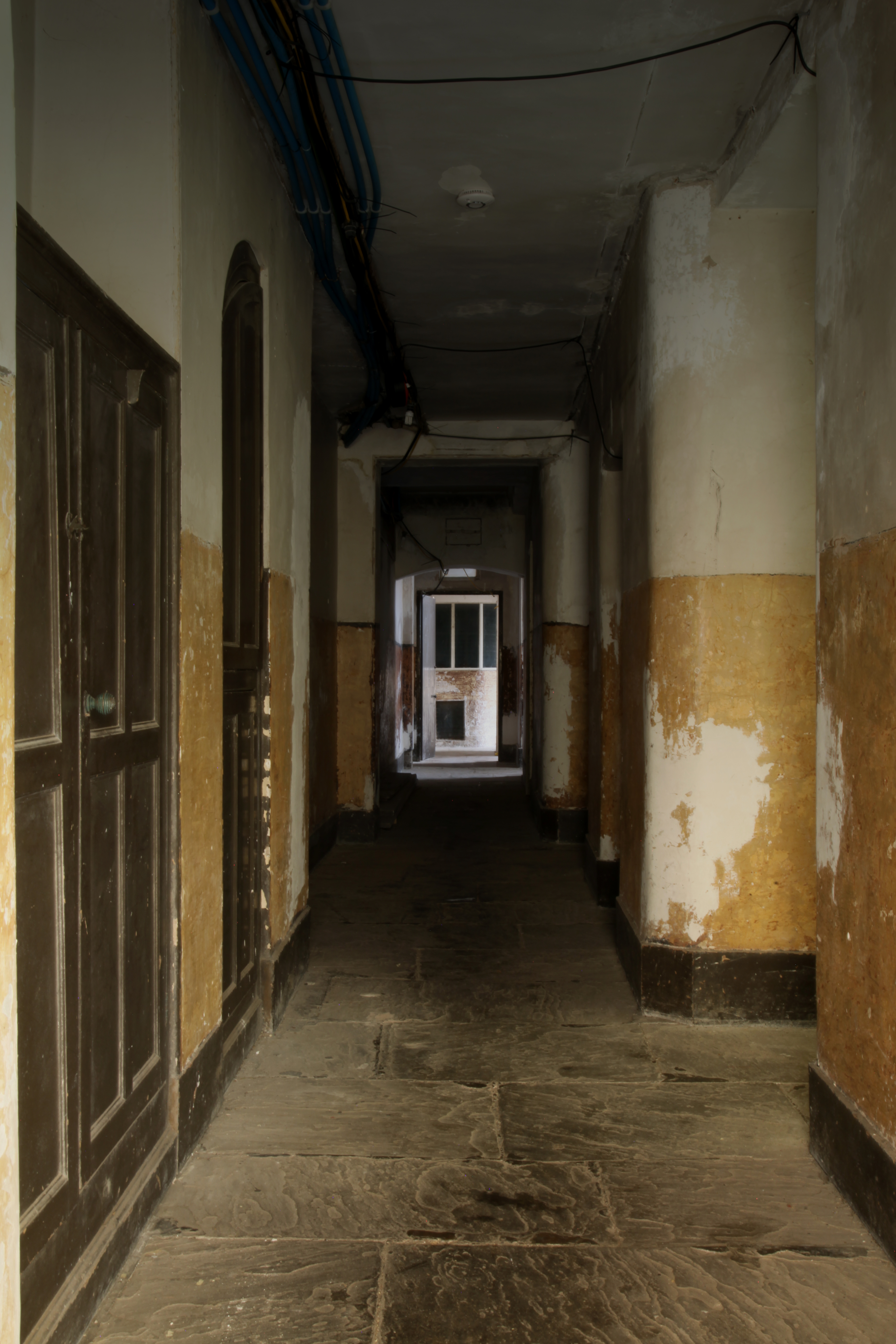
The basement of 10 Brunswick Square, the annexe of The Regency Town House. This is the last basement in Brunswick Square that remains intact.

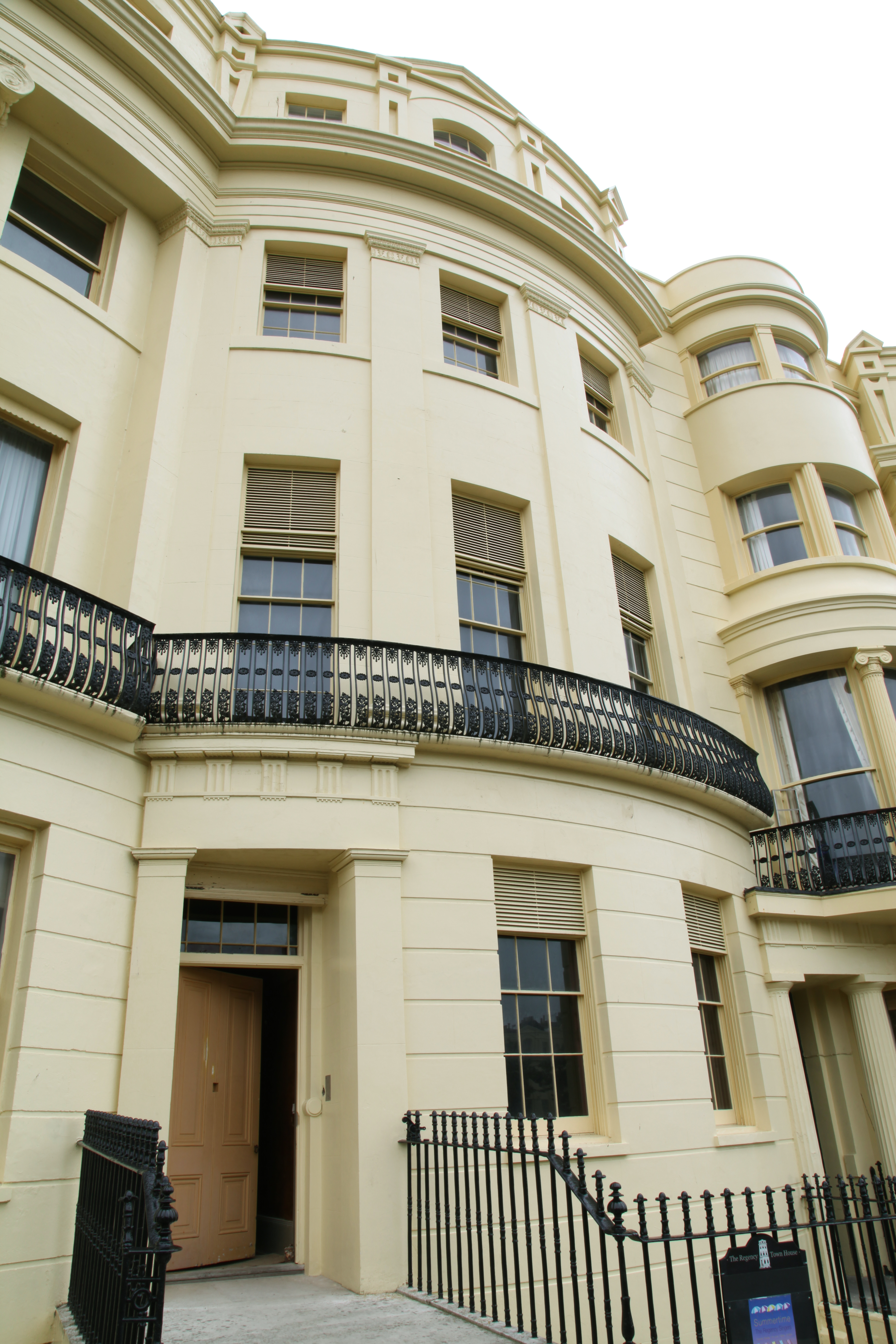
The Exterior of 13 Brunswick Square. The early glass was fragile and storm shutters protected the glass from stones blown up during storms.
