= Salomons Museum =

Museum in the county of Kent, southeast England

Coordinates: 51°9′8″N 0°14′28″E

The Salomons Museum is a museum north of Tunbridge Wells, in the county of Kent, southeast England. It preserves the country house of Sir David Salomons, the first Jewish Lord Mayor of London, and of his nephew, Sir David Lionel Salomons, a scientist and engineer. Originally called Broomhill, the house is now called Salomons. The museum is managed by Markerstudy Group.

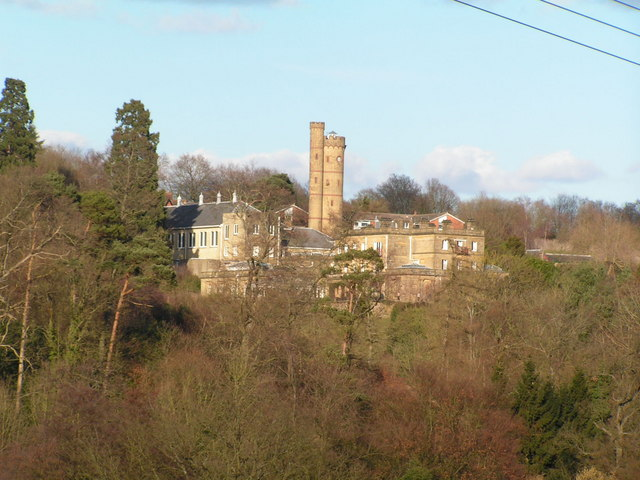
Salomons Museum

== Architecture ==
The house was built in the 1830s by Decimus Burton. It features an extremely tall water tower, stables, a private science lecture theatre and Sir David Lionel's laboratories. Major additions were made in 1854, 1863, 1908, 1910 and 1913. The house is a Grade II listed building.

== Collections ==
The museum preserves the bench from which David Salomons rose to speak in 1851, becoming the first Jew ever to speak in Parliament.

The first Jew elected to Parliament was Baron Lionel de Rothschild. Elected in 1847, he refused to swear his oath of office using the phrase "on the true faith of a Christian." Unable, therefore, to serve, he stood down but was again elected M.P. for the City of London in 1850. He took his oath leaving out the crucial phrase. A Parliamentary debate ensued, the conclusion of which was that a non-Christian could not take a seat in Parliament. David Salomons was elected MP for Greenwich in an 1851 by-election. He arrived at Parliament on 18 July 1851, and, like Rothschild, took his oath omitting the words "on the true faith of a Christian". He sat on the bench in the museum's collection, but when requested to leave a second time he stood and departed. He returned three days later and again took his seat. A heated debate ensued. A fellow MP for the Liberal Party turned to Salomons and inquired what he intended to do. Salomons stood and spoke, the first Jew to ever speak in Parliament. He said that he had been elected by a large majority, and that he was carrying out the wishes of the people in being there. He voted three times before he was removed by the Serjeant-at-Arms. Salomons was fined £500 for voting illegally. The law requiring Members of Parliament to swear an oath "on the true faith of a Christian" was changed in 1858. Lionel de Rothschild, who had been elected yet again in 1857, became the first Jewish MP, taking his seat as soon as the law was changed. David Salomons was elected for Greenwich in 1859 and continued to sit in Parliament until his death in 1873.

Items in the museum include Sir David Lionel Salomons' collections of hot air ballooning memorabilia, early automobiles, a Welte Philharmonic-Organ and writings on electrical and scientific subjects. There is also a collection of Judaica, which includes the tablets of the Ten Commandments from the Salomons family's private Roof-top synagogue in Brighton.

== Sources ==
- David Salomons House; catalogue of mementos, Malcolm Denis Brown, printed privately by T. and A. Constable, 1968.
- The Story of Three David Salomons at Broomhill, James William Parkes, 1950
- Catalogue of the Library at Broomhill, Tunbridge Wells: The Property of Sir David Lionel Salomons, Bt., by Sir David Salomons, Edition 3, 1903
