= John Angerstein =

John Angerstein may refer to:

- John Julius Angerstein (1735–1823), London merchant, Lloyd's under-writer, and patron of the fine arts
- John Angerstein (MP) (c. 1774–1858), his son, Member of Parliament for Greenwich 1835–1937
