= The Card Players (Wilkie) =

Painting by David Wilkie

- Artist: David Wilkie
- Year: 1808
- Type: Oil on panel, genre painting
- Dimensions: 53.3 cm × 74.9 cm (21.0 in × 29.5 in)
- Location: Private collection

The Card Players is an 1808 genre painting by the British artist David Wilkie. It features a group of figures playing card game in a room in a tavern or kitchen. Stylistically it draws inspiration from the classic genre scenes of the Dutch Old Masters. The young Scotsman Wilkie burst onto the London art world with his The Village Politicians in 1806. His genre paintings were popular and influential throughout the Regency era.

The painting was displayed at the Royal Academy Exhibition of 1808 at Somerset House. The picture was hung close to J.M.W. Turner'S The Unpaid Bill regarded by critics as an attempt to take on Wilkie. His sole exhibit that year, it was very popular with audiences, who appreciated Wilkie's skill in producing what was almost a still life.

== Bibliography ==
- Lübbren, Nina. Narrative Painting in Nineteenth-Century Europe. Manchester University Press, 2023.
- Newman, Gerald (ed.) Britain in the Hanoverian Age, 1714-1837; An Encyclopedia. Garland Publishing, 1998.
- Tromans, Nicholas. David Wilkie: The People's Painter. Edinburgh University Press, 2007.
