= James Dundas (Royal Navy officer) =

Royal Navy Admiral (1785–1862)

Admiral Sir James Dundas GCB
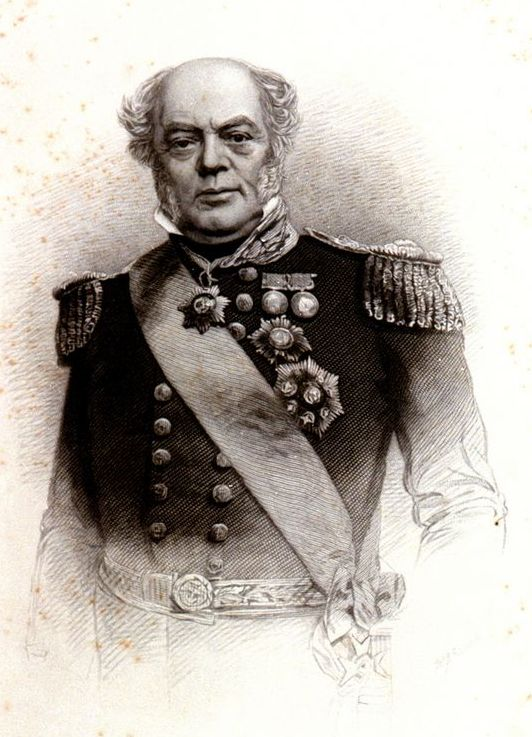
- Born: 4 December 1785
- Died: 3 October 1862 (aged 76); Weymouth, Dorset
- Military career
- Allegiance: United Kingdom
- Branch: Royal Navy
- Service years: 1799–1857
- Rank: Admiral
- Commands: HMS Tagus; HMS Prince Regent; HMS Britannia; Mediterranean Fleet; Baltic Fleet
- Conflicts: Napoleonic Wars; Crimean War
- Awards: Knight Grand Cross of the Order of the Bath

Admiral Sir James Whitley Deans Dundas, GCB (4 December 1785 – 3 October 1862) was a Royal Navy officer. He took part in the Napoleonic Wars, first as a junior officer when he took part in the Anglo-Russian invasion of Holland in Autumn 1799 and later as a commander when he was in action at Copenhagen Dockyard shortly after the capture of that City in August 1807. He also served as Whig Member of Parliament for Greenwich and then for Devizes and became First Naval Lord in the First Russell ministry in July 1847 and in that role his service was dominated by the needs of Whig party. He was appointed Commander-in-Chief in the Mediterranean in 1852 and led all naval operations in the Black Sea including the bombardment of Sevastopol in October 1854 during the Crimean War.

== Early career ==
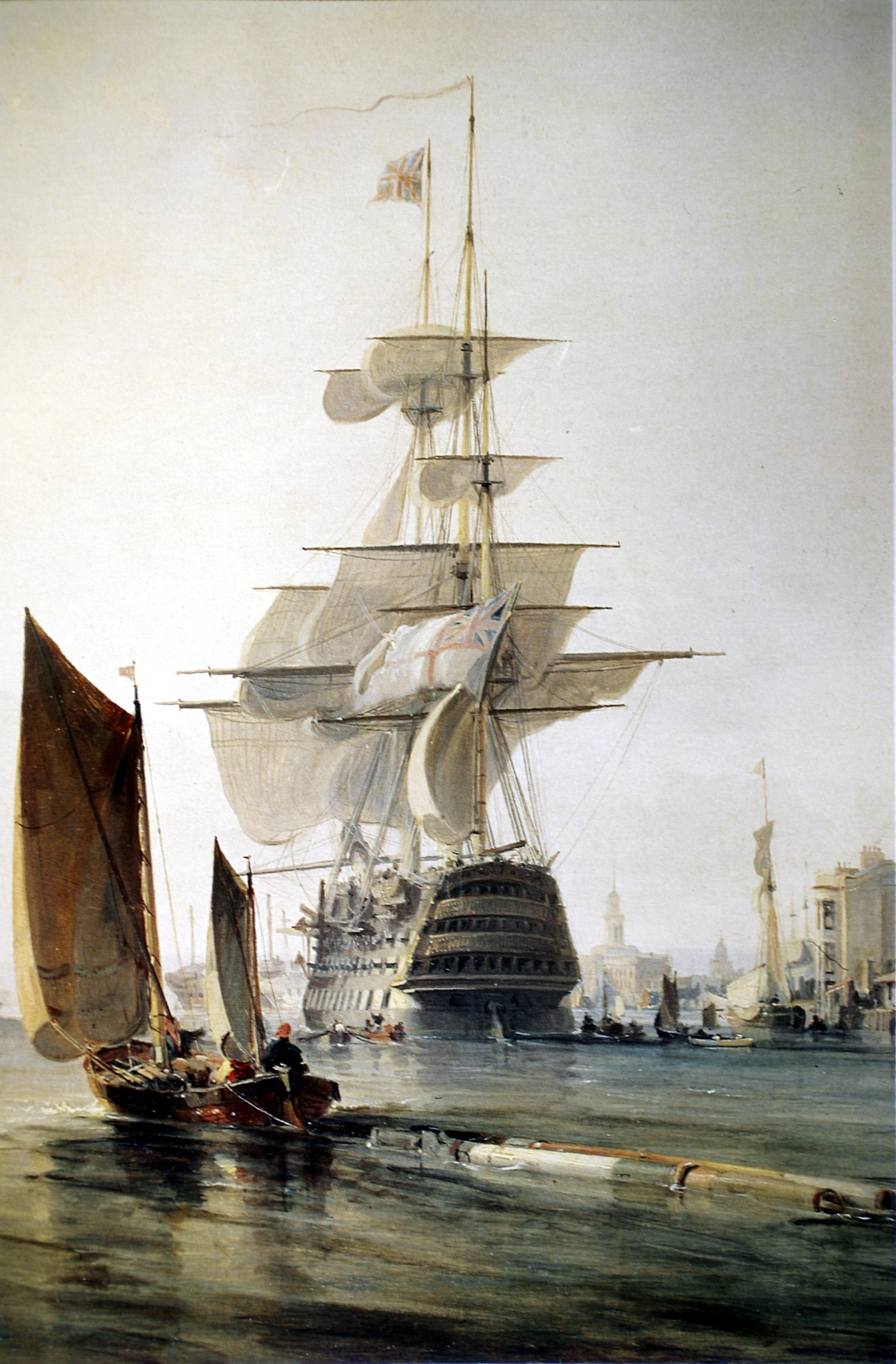
The first-rate HMS Britannia, a ship commanded by Dundas, as flag captain to Admiral Sir Philip Durham who was Commander-in-Chief, Portsmouth

Born the son of Dr James Deans (of Calcutta) and Janet Deans (née Dundas), daughter of Thomas Dundas MP, James Deans, as he then was, joined the Royal Navy in March 1799. He initially joined the third-rate HMS Kent and took part in the Anglo-Russian invasion of Holland in Autumn 1799 during the War of the Second Coalition. In 1802 he saw action in combat with the French ship Duguay Trouin and was also involved with the capture of La Vautour. Promoted to lieutenant on 25 May 1805, he joined the fifth-rate HMS Cambrian and took part in capturing three privateers that year. After serving for a few weeks as flag-lieutenant to Admiral The Hon. George Berkeley on the North American Station and having been promoted to commander on 8 October 1806, he was given command of the fifth-rate HMS Rosamond but was injured while putting out a fire at Copenhagen Dockyard shortly after the capture of that City in August 1807. Promoted to captain on 13 October 1807, he briefly took command of the fifth-rate HMS Cambrian. Following his marriage to Janet Dundas he assumed the surname of Dundas in April 1808.

Dundas was given command of the third-rate HMS Stately, flagship of Rear Admiral Thomas Bertie, in the Baltic Fleet in March 1809. He took command of the third-rate HMS Venerable in January 1812 and then the frigate HMS Pyramus in September 1812 and in the latter ship captured two more privateers. He took command of the armed frigate HMS Tagus in the Mediterranean Fleet in August 1815 and then the first-rate HMS Prince Regent, as flag captain to Admiral Sir William Parker who was commanding on the coast of Portugal, in 1830.

Entering politics, Dundas became Whig Member of Parliament for Greenwich at the 1832 general election and, having also become Deputy Lieutenant of Berkshire on 16 June 1834, he sat in Parliament until he stood down at the 1835 general election in favour of a fellow Whig. He was then given command of the first-rate HMS Britannia, as flag captain to Admiral Sir Philip Durham who was Commander-in-Chief, Portsmouth, in 1836. He became Member of Parliament for Devizes in February 1836 in place of Sir Philip Durham who had stood down as Member of Parliament for that constituency. He then resigned his seat in Parliament when he became Clerk of the Ordnance on 21 March 1838. He was appointed a Companion of the Order of the Bath on 25 October 1839.

Having been elected Member of Parliament for Greenwich again at the 1841 general election, Dundas became Fourth Naval Lord in the Second Melbourne ministry in June 1841 but stood down in September 1841 when the Government fell from power.

== Senior command ==
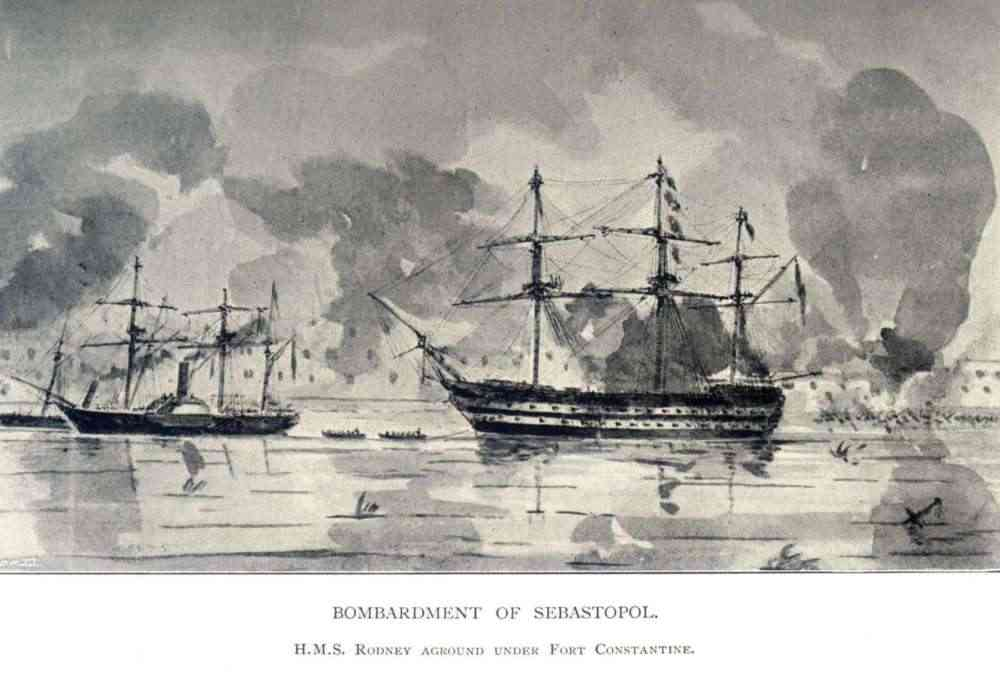
The bombardment of Sevastopol which was led by Dundas

Promoted to rear-admiral on 23 November 1841, Dundas became Second Naval Lord in the First Russell ministry in July 1846 before stepping up to be First Naval Lord in the same ministry in July 1847. As First Sea Lord his service was dominated by the needs of Whig party and he stood down as First Naval Lord when the Government fell from power in February 1852.

Dundas was appointed Commander-in-Chief of the Mediterranean Fleet in 1852 and consequently resigned from the House of Commons, using the device of seeking appointment as Steward of the Manor of Hempholme, on 29 January 1852. Promoted to vice-admiral on 17 December 1852, he led all naval operations in the Black Sea in command of the Baltic Fleet during the Crimean War.

Oriental Army of the Crimean campaign by Gustav Bartsch. From left to right: Admiral Ferdinand-Alphonse Hamelin, Lord Lucan, Lord Raglan, Admiral Dundas, Sir John Campbell, Duke of Cambridge, Lord Cardigan, Ismail Pasha, Omer Pasha, Muhlis Pasha (Grigore Sturdza), Sultan Abdülmecid I, Said-Bey (Vasile Obedeanu), Ahmed Pasha, col. Desmaret, Marshal Baraguey d'Hilliers, Prince Napoleon, col. Trochu, Marshal de Saint-Arnaud, general Bosquet, general de Canrobert

Dundas returned to England in January 1855 and was appointed to the Turkish Order of the Medjidie (First Class) on 15 May 1855, advanced to Knight Grand Cross of the Order of the Bath on 5 July 1855 and awarded the Grand Cross of the French Legion of Honour on 30 April 1857. Promoted to full admiral on 8 December 1857, he died at Weymouth in Dorset on 3 October 1862.

== Family ==
On 2 April 1808, he married his first cousin, Janet, only daughter and heiress of Charles Dundas, later Lord Amesbury. His first wife died in April 1846 and, in August 1847, he married Lady Emily Moreton, fourth daughter of Thomas Reynolds-Moreton, 1st Earl of Ducie. By his first wife, he had a life interest in large estates in Flintshire and Berkshire – centred on Aston Hall in Flintshire and Barton Court at Kintbury in Berkshire – which, at his death, passed to his grandson, Mr. Charles Amesbury Deans Dundas. (Dundas' elder son, Charles Whitley Deans Dundas, having predeceased him in 1856.)

== See also ==
- Deans Dundas Bay
- List of British recipients of the Légion d'Honneur for the Crimean War

Parliament of the United Kingdom
| New constituency | Member of Parliament for Greenwich; 1832–1835; With: Edward George Barnard | Succeeded by Edward George Barnard; John Angerstein |
| Preceded by Sir Philip Charles Durham; Thomas Estcourt | Member of Parliament for Devizes; 1836–1838; With: Thomas Estcourt | Succeeded by Thomas Estcourt; George Heneage Walker Heneage |
| Preceded by Edward George Barnard; Matthias Wolverley Attwood | Member of Parliament for Greenwich; 1841–1852; With: Edward George Barnard 1841–1851; David Salomons 1851–1852 | Succeeded by Houston Stewart; David Salomons |
Military offices
| Preceded by Sir Andrew Leith Hay | Clerk of the Ordnance; 1838–1841 | Succeeded by George Anson |
| Preceded by Sir Samuel Pechell | Fourth Naval Lord; 1841 | Succeeded by Sir William Gordon |
| Preceded by Sir William Gage | Second Naval Lord; 1846–1847 | Succeeded by Sir Henry Prescott |
| Preceded by Sir Charles Adam | First Naval Lord; 1847–1852 | Succeeded by Sir Maurice Berkeley |
| Preceded by Sir William Parker | Commander-in-Chief, Mediterranean Fleet; 1852–1854 | Succeeded by Sir Edmund Lyons |
