= Venus and Adonis (Phillips) =

Painting by Henry Thomas Phillips

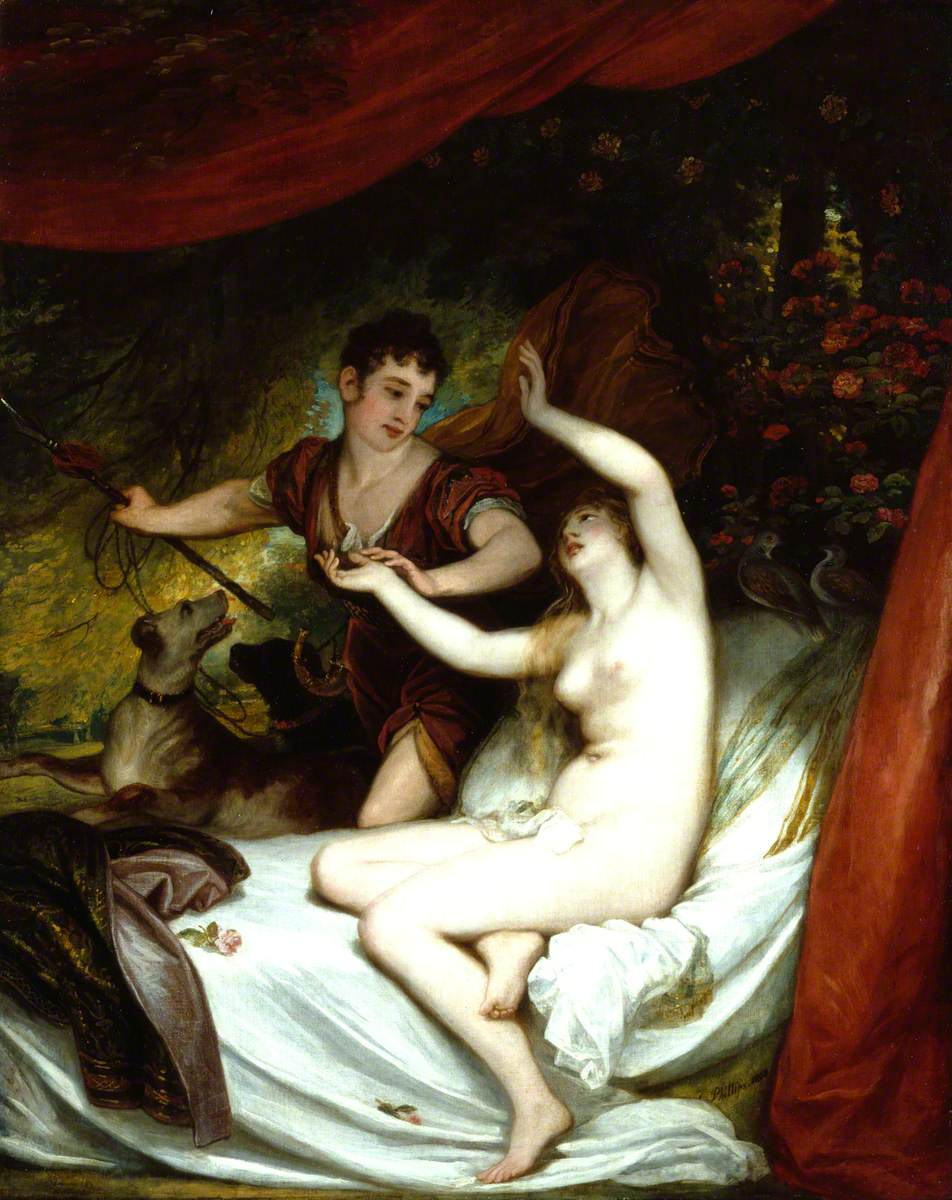
- Artist: Thomas Phillips
- Year: 1808
- Type: Oil on canvas, history painting
- Dimensions: 127.4 cm × 101.9 cm (50.2 in × 40.1 in)
- Location: Royal Academy of Arts, London

Venus and Adonis is an 1808 history painting by the British artist Thomas Phillips. It depicts a scene from Greek and Roman Mythology. Venus, the Goddess of Love, trying to persuade her lover Adonis to stay with her and not go out hunting. As often she is shown with doves while he is accompanied by a dog.

Phillips was one of the top portrait painters of the Regency era alongside Thomas Lawrence When in 1808 he was elected a full member of the Royal Academy he was required to submit as a diploma work. The rules of the Academy forbade him from submitting a portrait so he presented this. The work was displayed at the Royal Academy Exhibition of 1808 at Somerset House. It remains in the collection of the Royal Academy.

== Bibliography ==
- Chambers, Neil (ed.) Letters Of Sir Joseph Banks, The, A Selection, 1768-1820. World Scientific Publishing, 2000.
- Wright, Christopher, Gordon, Catherine May & Smith, Mary Peskett. British and Irish Paintings in Public Collections: An Index of British and Irish Oil Paintings by Artists Born Before 1870 in Public and Institutional Collections in the United Kingdom and Ireland. Yale University Press, 2006.
