= Portrait of William Pitt (Lawrence) =

1807 painting by Thomas Lawrence

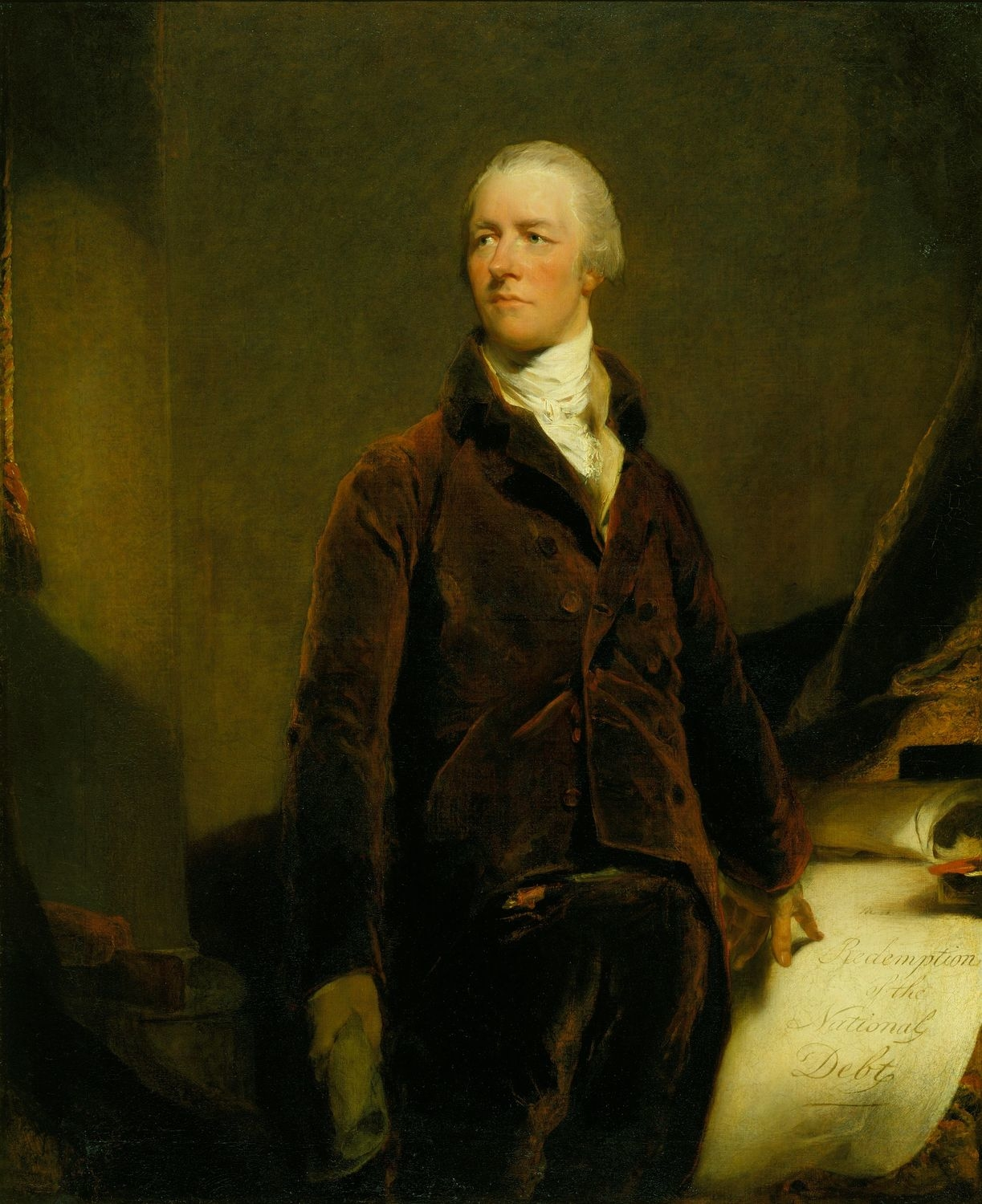
- Artist: Thomas Lawrence
- Year: 1807
- Type: Oil on canvas, portrait
- Dimensions: 150 cm × 121 cm (59.1 in × 47.8 in)
- Location: Royal Collection, Windsor Castle

Portrait of William Pitt is an 1807 portrait painting by the English artist Thomas Lawrence of the British politician William Pitt the Younger. It was one of a number of depictions of prime ministers executed by Lawrence during his career.

William Pitt, the son of Pitt the Elder, served as prime minister from 1783 to 1801 and again from 1804 to 1806. He led Britain through much of the French Revolutionary Wars and early Napoleonic Wars. Pitt had intended to sit for Lawrence before his death in January 1806. Painted posthumously, Lawrence was forced to rely on a bust by Joseph Nollekens and his own observations from memory of earlier meetings with Pitt. It was commissioned by the art collector John Julius Angerstein.

It was displayed at the Royal Academy's Summer Exhibition of 1808 at Somerset House in London. The impressive likeness of the former prime minister was widely commented on, possibly to the irritation of Lawrence's rival John Hoppner who had painted his own portrait of Pitt from life. One review observed that it had "a mixture of ideal art with a sufficiency of that personal resemblance which a portrait requires" and it was "a portrait in the epic style of painting, and worthy of going down to posterity".

Pitt is shown holding a scroll in one hand and pointing to a paper with Redemption of the National Debt written on it. Today the work hangs in the Waterloo Chamber at Windsor Castle having been acquired by George IV from Angerstein.

== See also ==
- Portrait of William Pitt (Hoppner), an 1804 painting by John Hoppner

== Bibliography ==
- Bishop, Roy. Paintings of the Royal Collection. G. G. Harrap, 1937.
- Hague, William. William Pitt the Younger: A Biography. HarperCollins UK, 2012.
- Elliott, Kamilla. Portraiture and British Gothic Fiction: The Rise of Picture Identification, 1764–1835. JHU Press, 2012.
- Levey, Michael. Sir Thomas Lawrence. Yale University Press, 2005.
