= Royal Academy Exhibition of 1808 =

1808 art exhibition in London

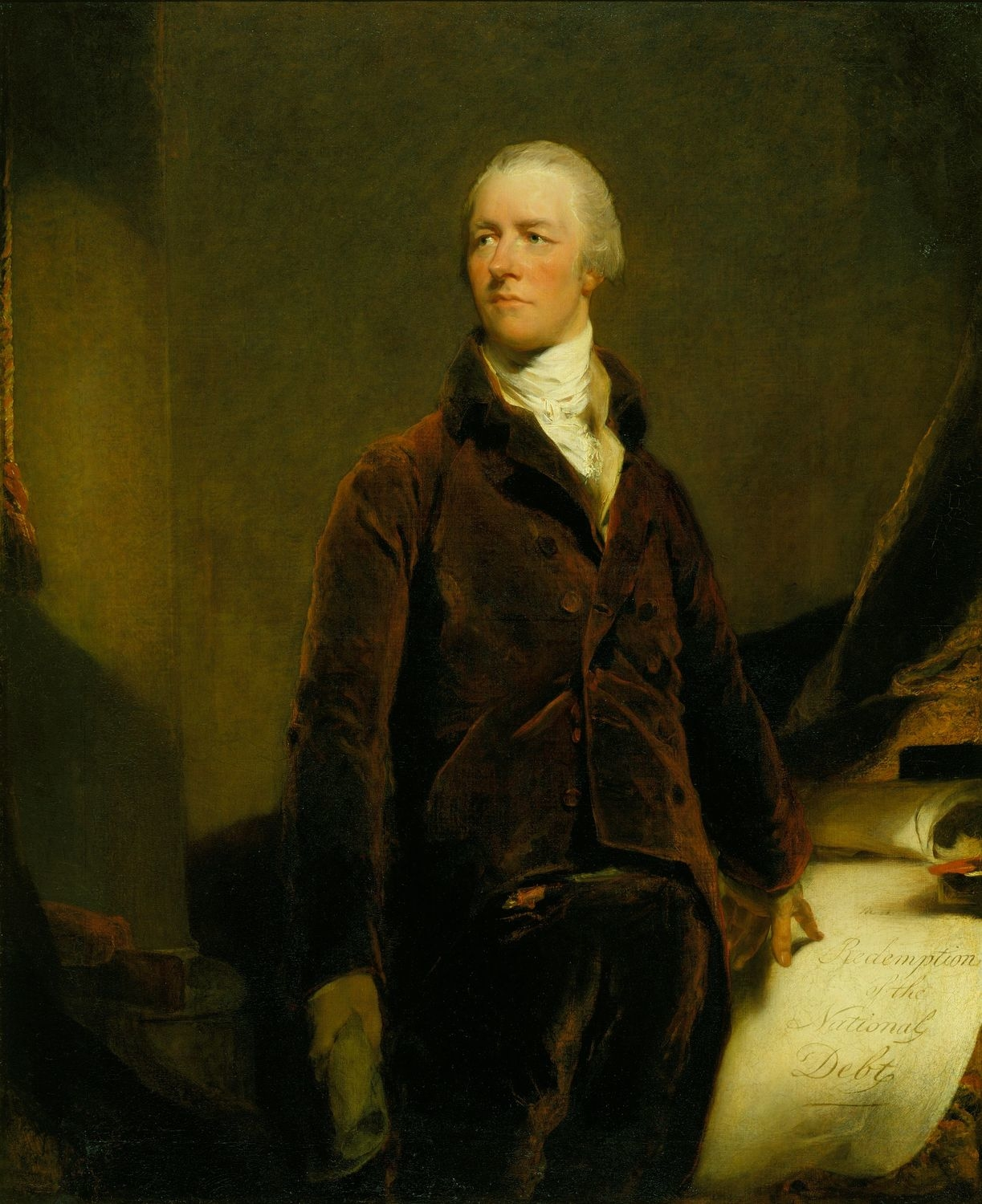
Portrait of William Pitt by Thomas Lawrence

The Royal Academy Exhibition of 1808 was the fortieth annual Summer Exhibition of the British Royal Academy of Arts. It was held at Somerset House in London between 2 May and 18 June 1808 during the early Regency era. It drew nearly sixty thousand visitors, but was "not particularly notable" according to one critic although other reviews were more positive.

One of the most popular works on display was the young Scottish artist David Wilkie's genre painting The Card Players. Wilkie had enjoyed success with his scenes of everyday life that drew inspiration from the Dutch Old Masters of the seventeenth century. J.M.W. Turner submitted his own genre work The Unpaid Bill, which was regarded as an attempt to match Wilkie. The Academy's hanging committee may have placed them close together to draw comparisons. However, critics were generally unimpressed that Turner had not focused on his atmospheric seascapes. This was the only work that Turner submitted to the Academy that year, instead displaying his paintings at his own studio gallery in Marylebone as well as the rival British Institution.

As often portraits featured heavily amongst the submitted works. Thomas Lawrence exhibited a clutch of fashionable works. Particular attention was drawn to his Portrait of William Pitt featuring the late Prime Minister. Lawrence's rival William Beechey presented a portrait of the Duke of Cambridge, a son of George III. Other prominent figures who submitted portraits included Martin Archer Shee, James Lonsdale and Samuel Lane.

The President of the Royal Academy Benjamin West displayed several history paintings including Thetis Bringing Armour to Achilles. His Death of Nelson in the Cockpit of the Victory was a follow-up to his 1806 painting The Death of Nelson. West had recently visited Bath in the West Country and he also exhibited four pictures of the county surrounding the city and nearby Bristol. West's fellow American John Singleton Copley displayed a Tudor era history painting The Offer of the Crown to Lady Jane Grey. Loutherbourg, close to the end of his lengthy career, sent in several landscapes reflecting the growing romantic style. John Constable, at this point a comparatively obscure young artist, sent in three pictures from his recent visit to the Lake District. These included views of Lake Windermere and Borrowdale in Cumberland.

== Gallery ==
The Unpaid Bill by J.M.W. Turner

The Card Players by David Wilkie

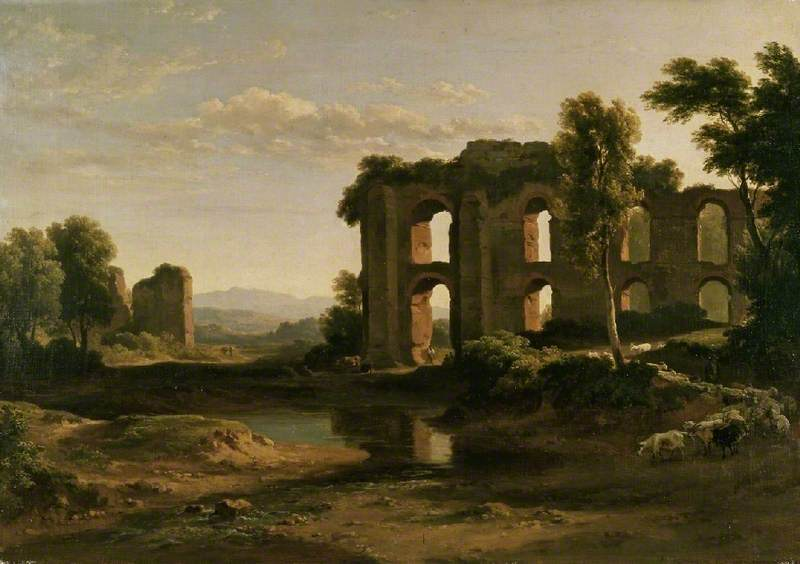
Landscape near Tivoli, with Part of the Claudian Aqueduct by Ramsay Richard Reinagle

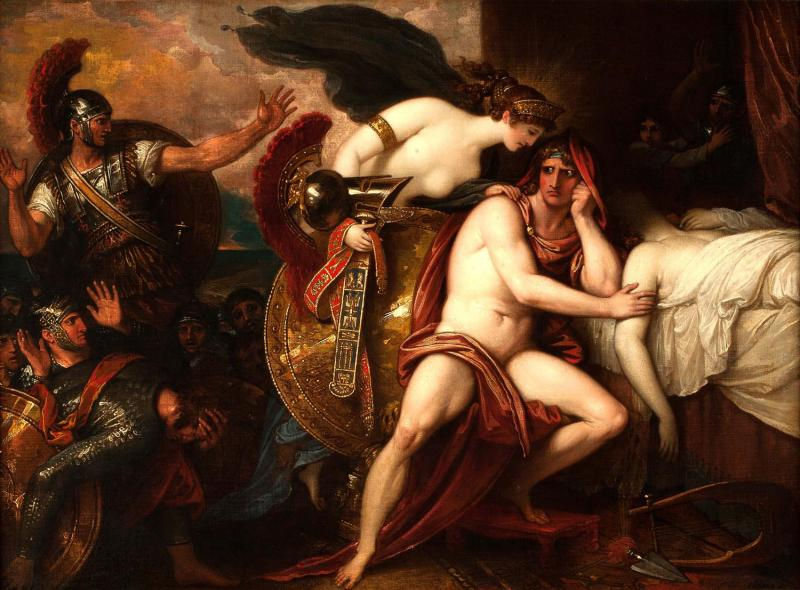
Thetis Bringing Armour to Achilles by Benjamin West

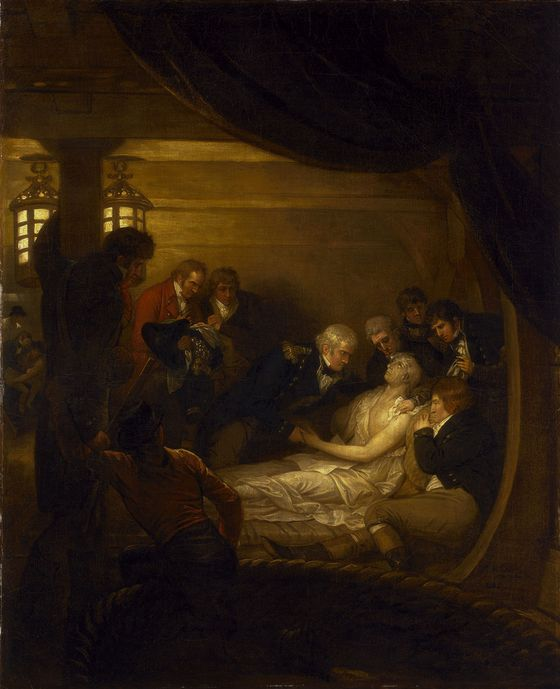
Death of Nelson in the Cockpit of the Victory by Benjamin West

Portrait of Lord Aberdeen by Thomas Lawrence

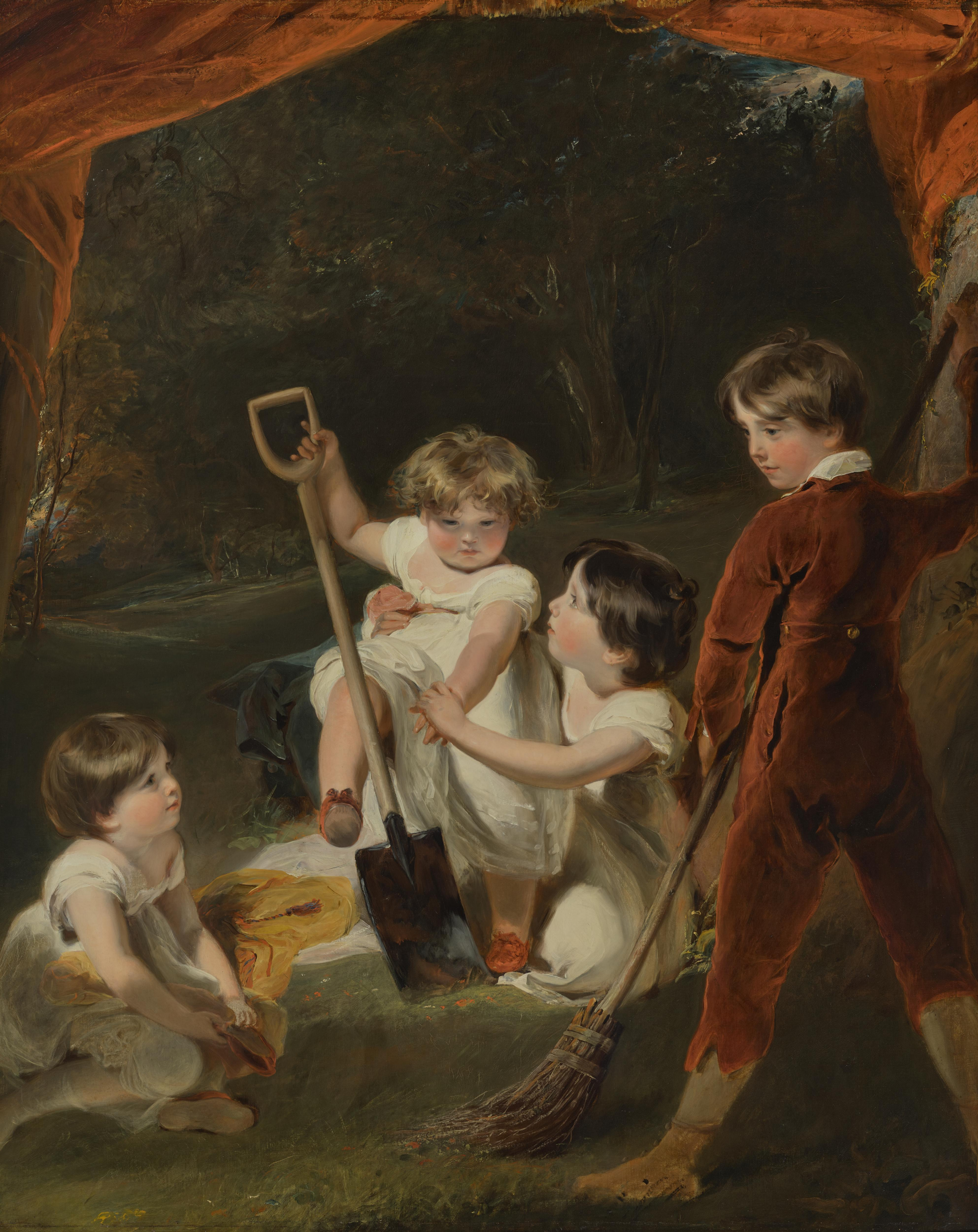
The Angerstein Children by Thomas Lawrence

Portrait of Lady Hood by Thomas Lawrence

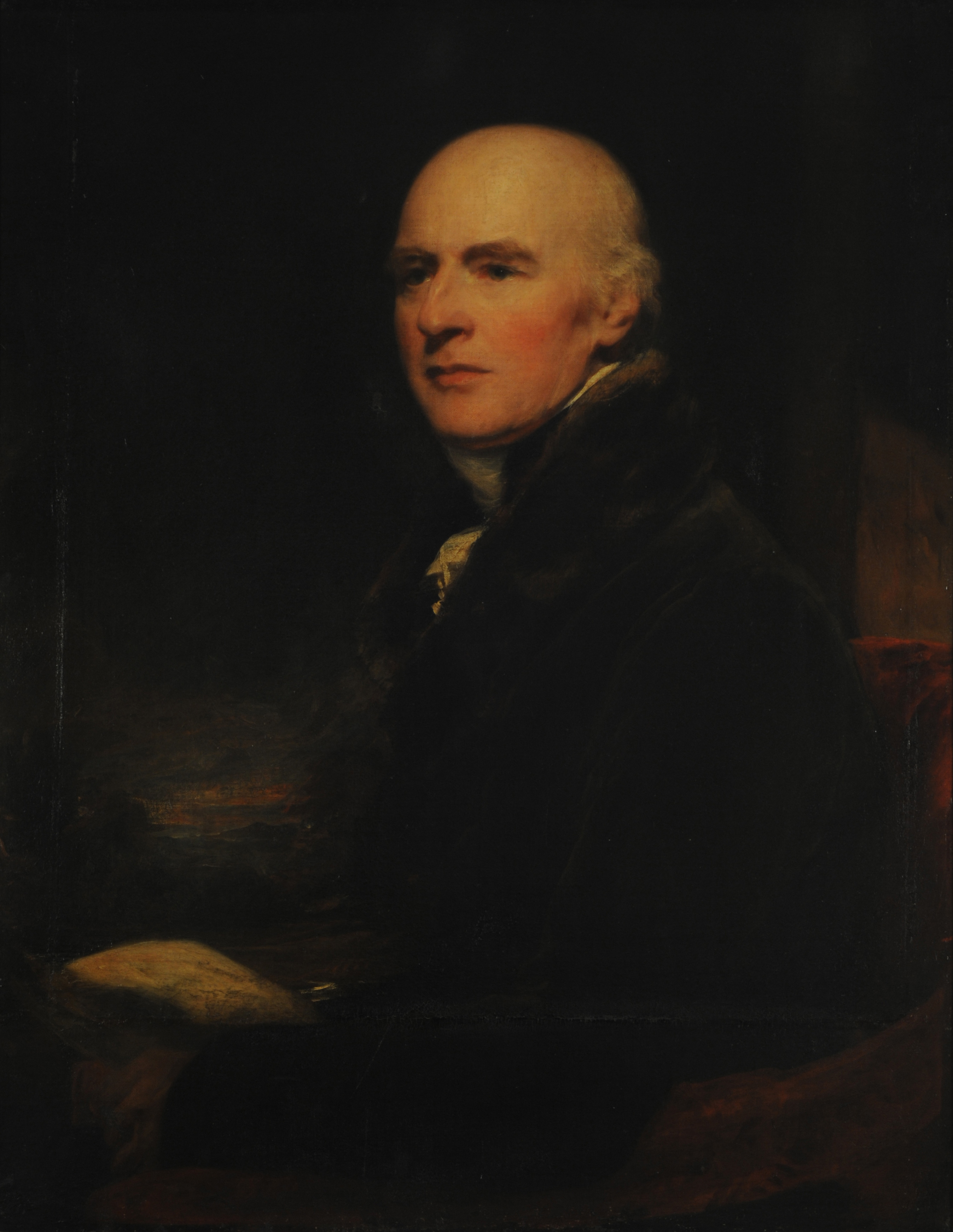
Portrait of Joseph Farington by Thomas Lawrence

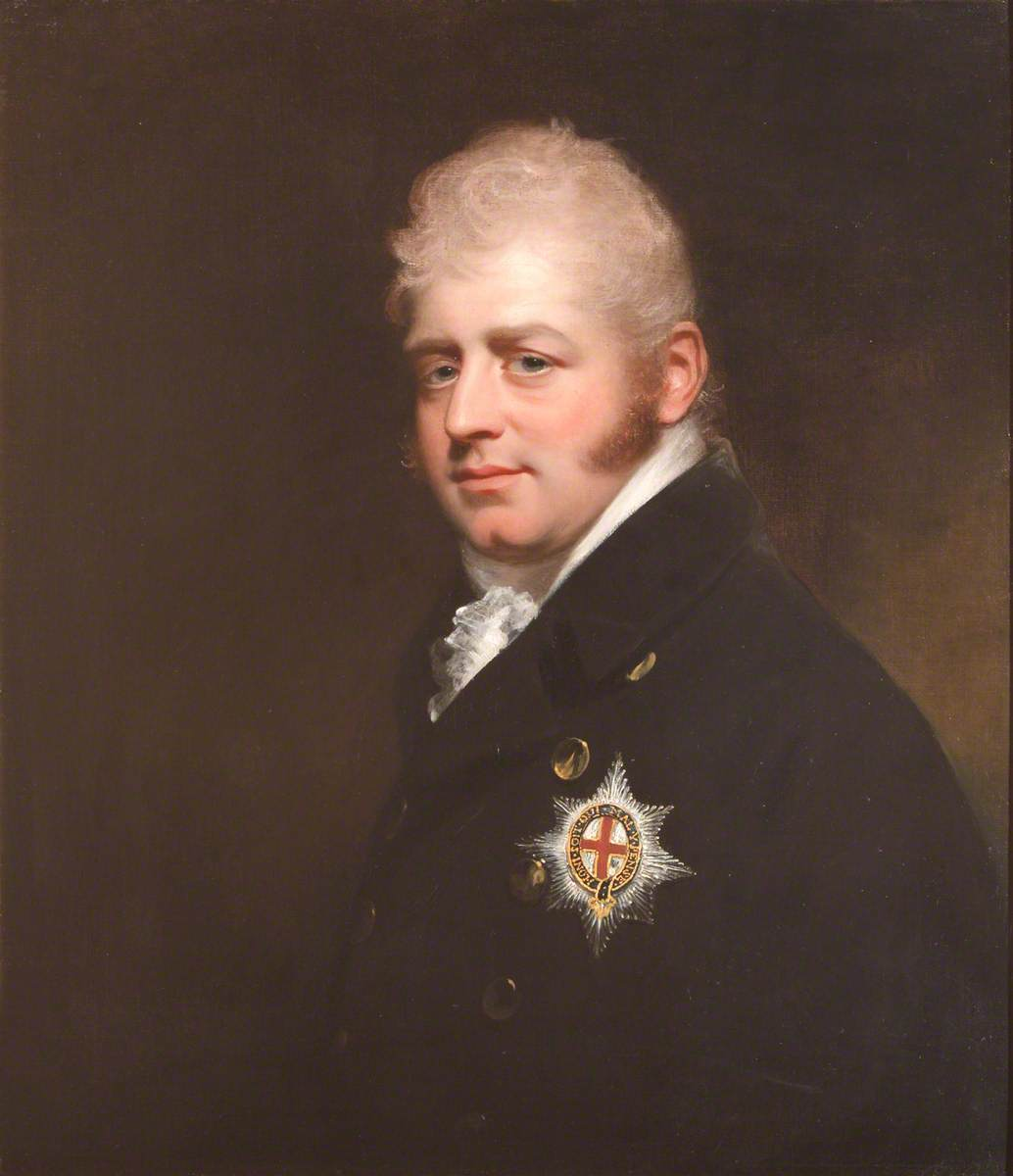
Portrait of the Duke of Cambridge by William Beechey

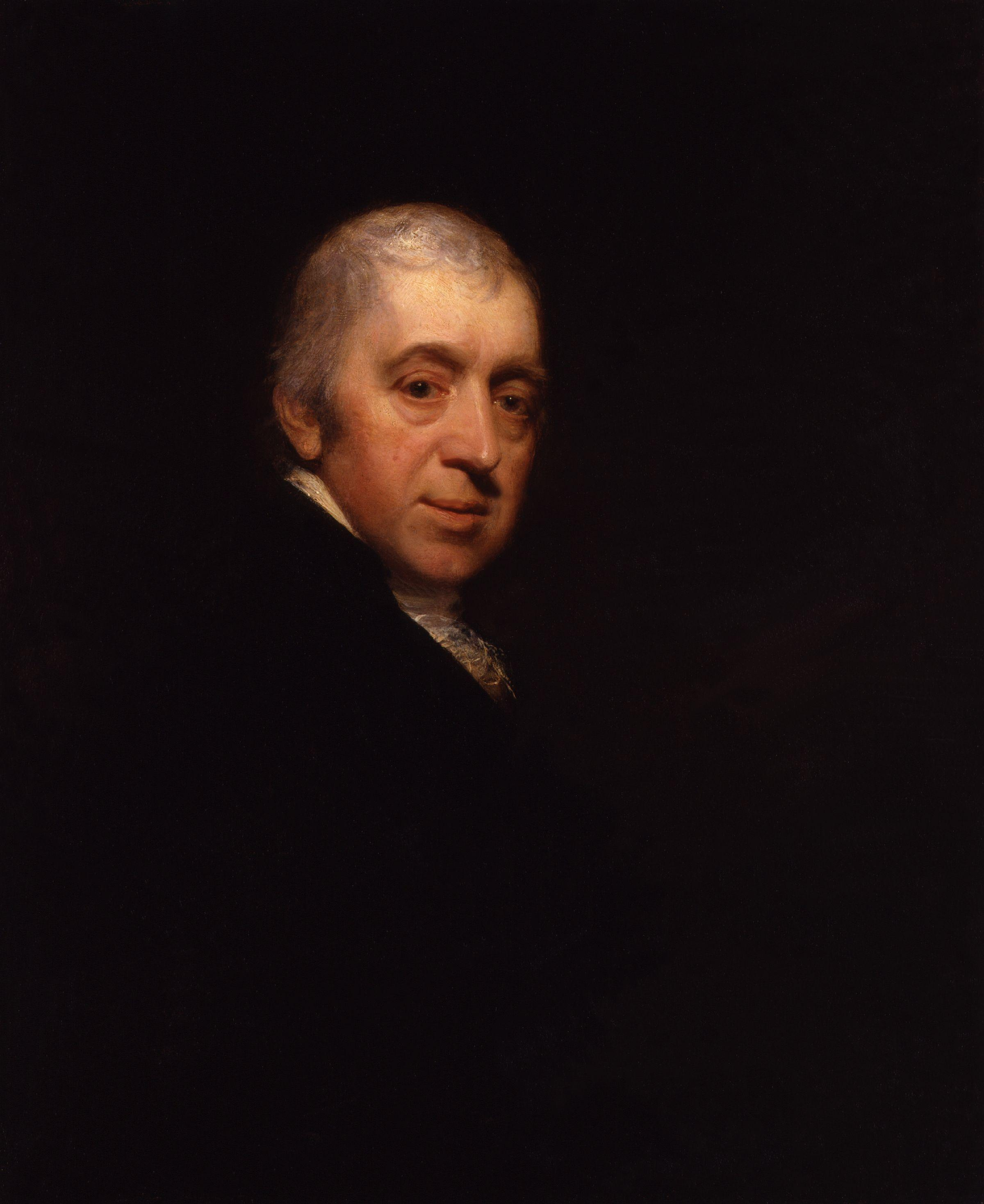
Portrait of the Earl of Mulgrave by William Beechey

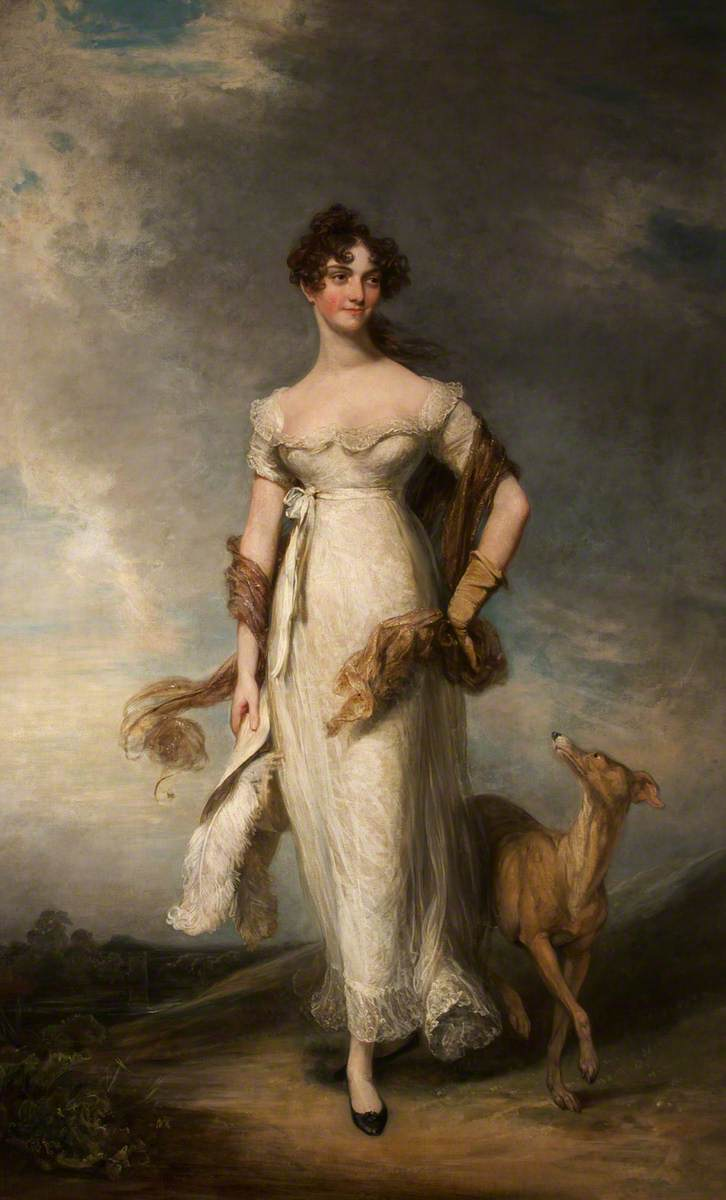
Portrait of Lady Leicester by William Owen

Portrait of Louisa Hope by Martin Archer Shee

Lavinia by Martin Archer Shee

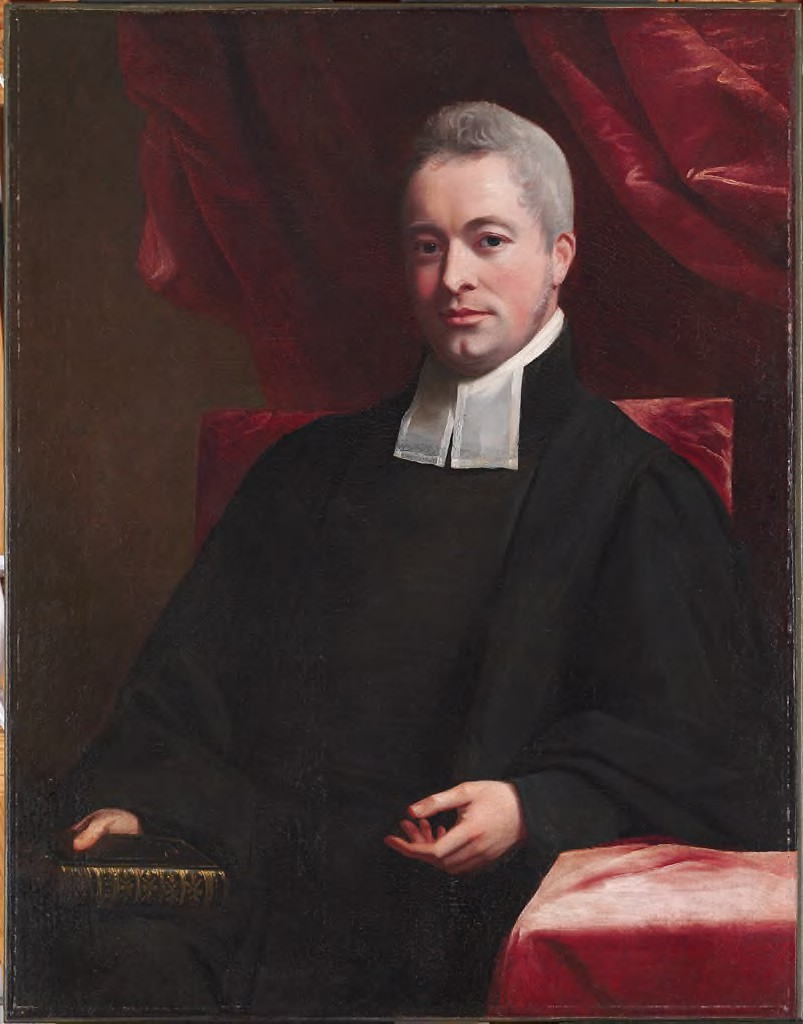
Portrait of John Codman by John Singleton Copley

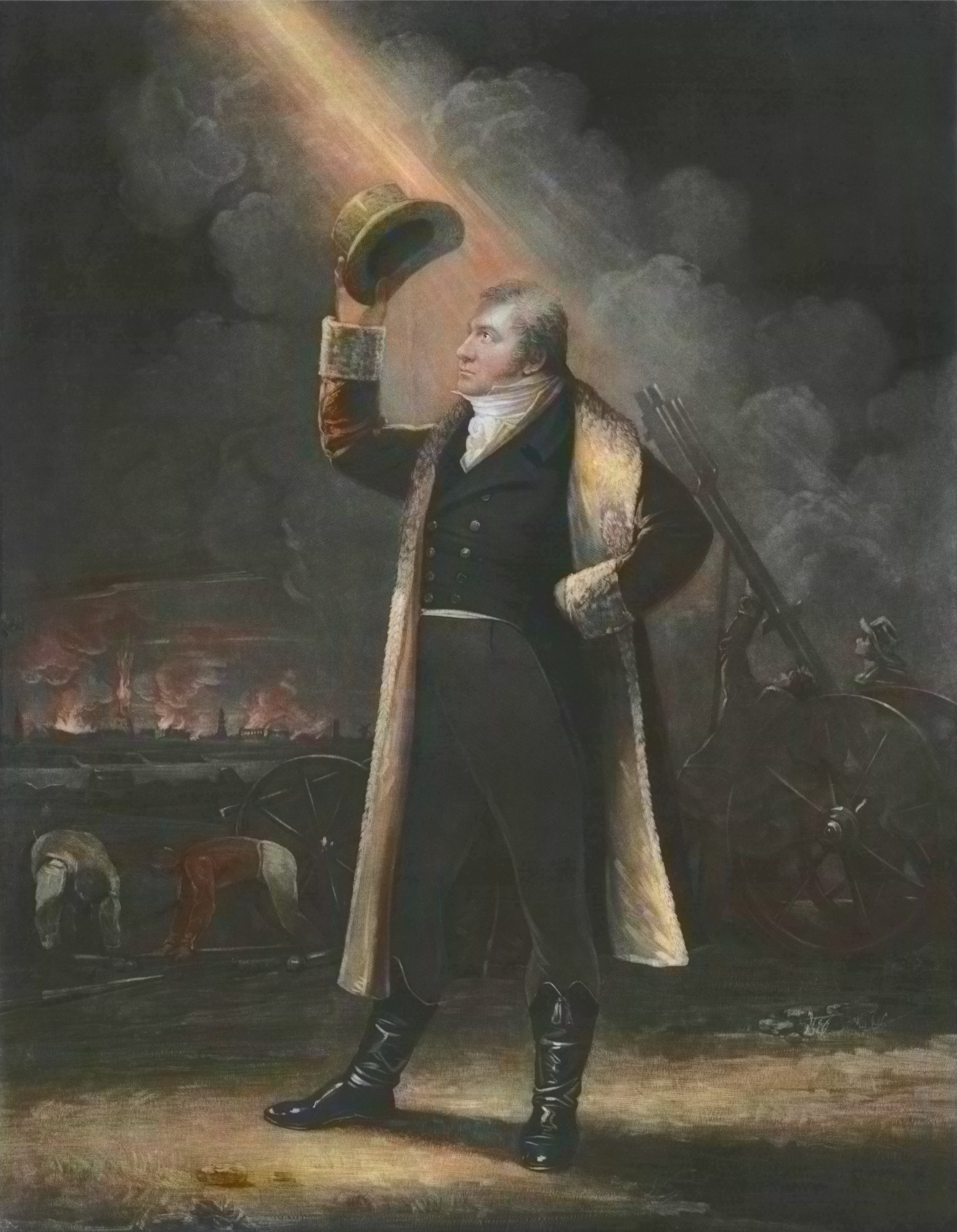
Portrait of William Congreve by James Lonsdale

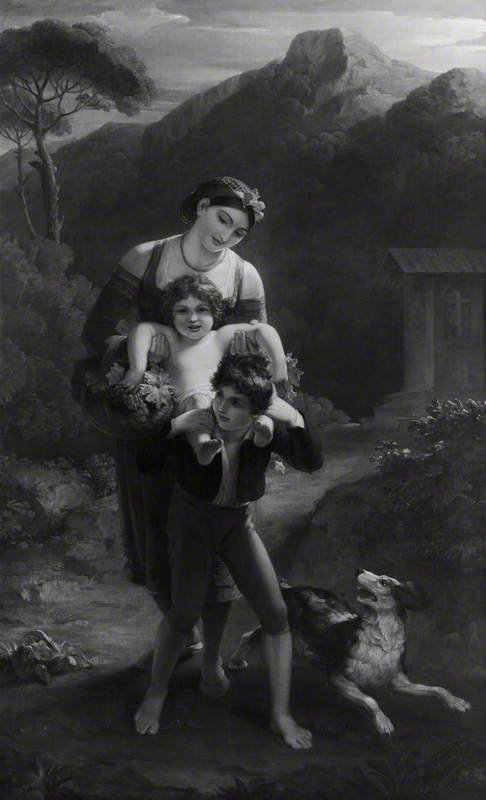
Peasants of Subiaco Returning from the Vineyard on a Holiday by Henry Howard

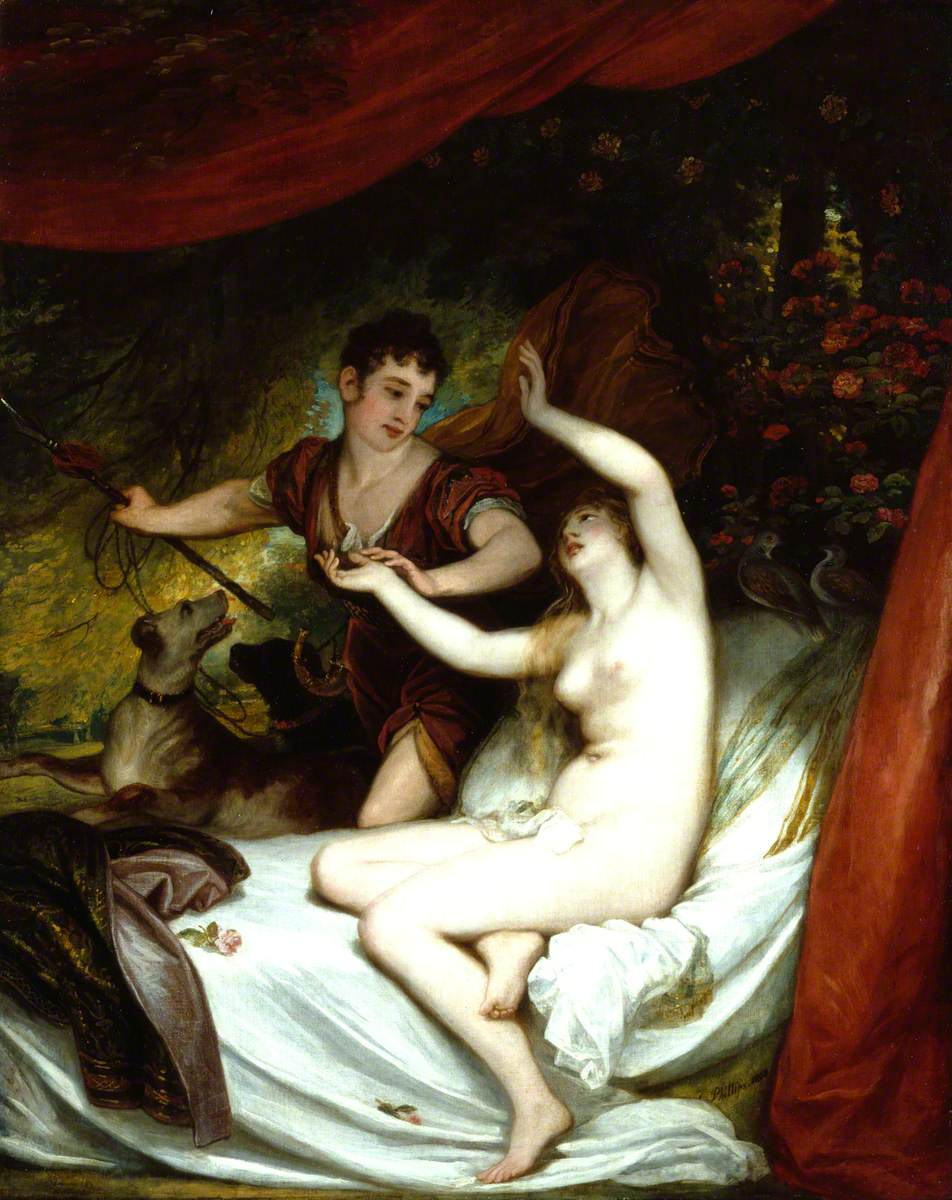
Venus and Adonis by Thomas Phillips

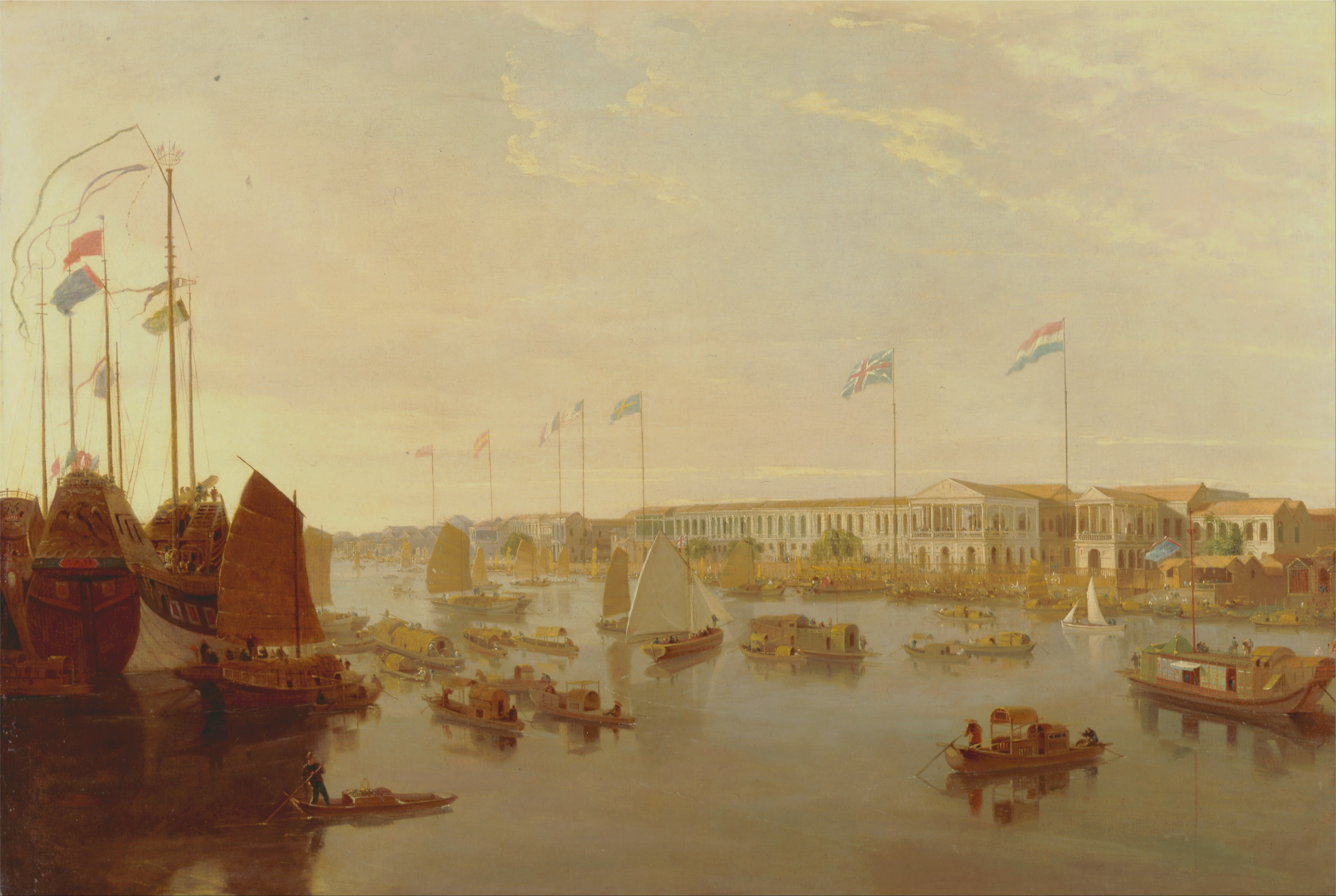
The European Factories, Canton by William Daniell

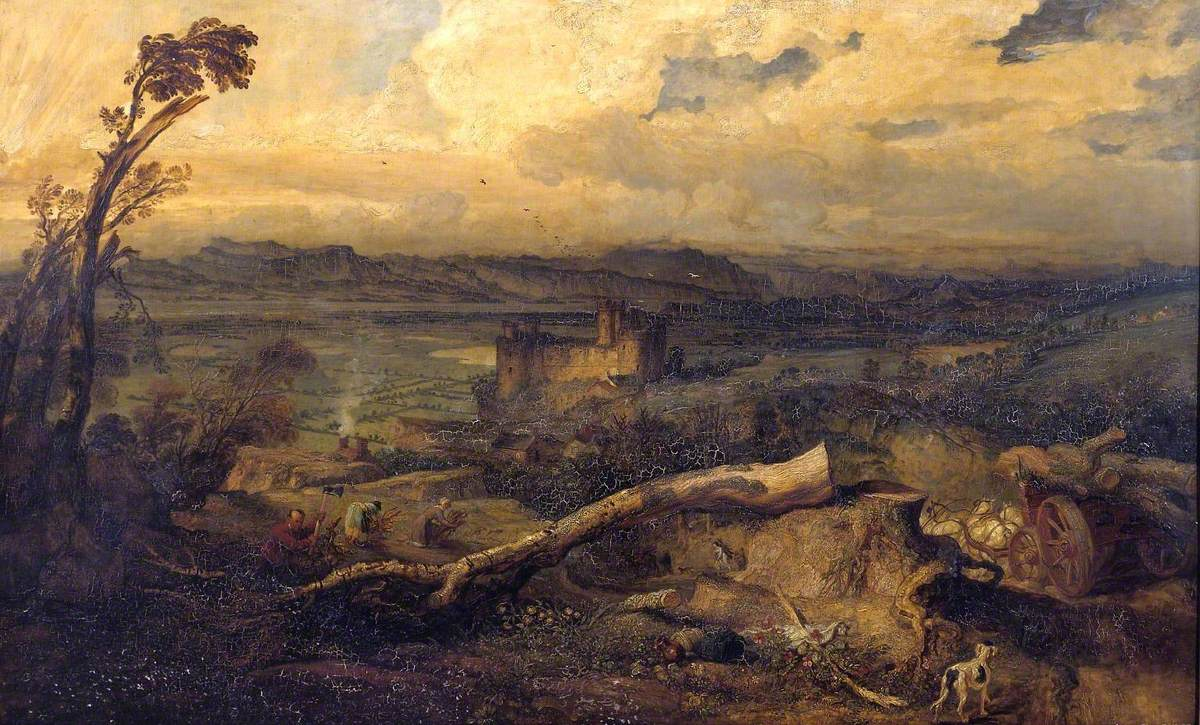
Harlech Castle by James Ward

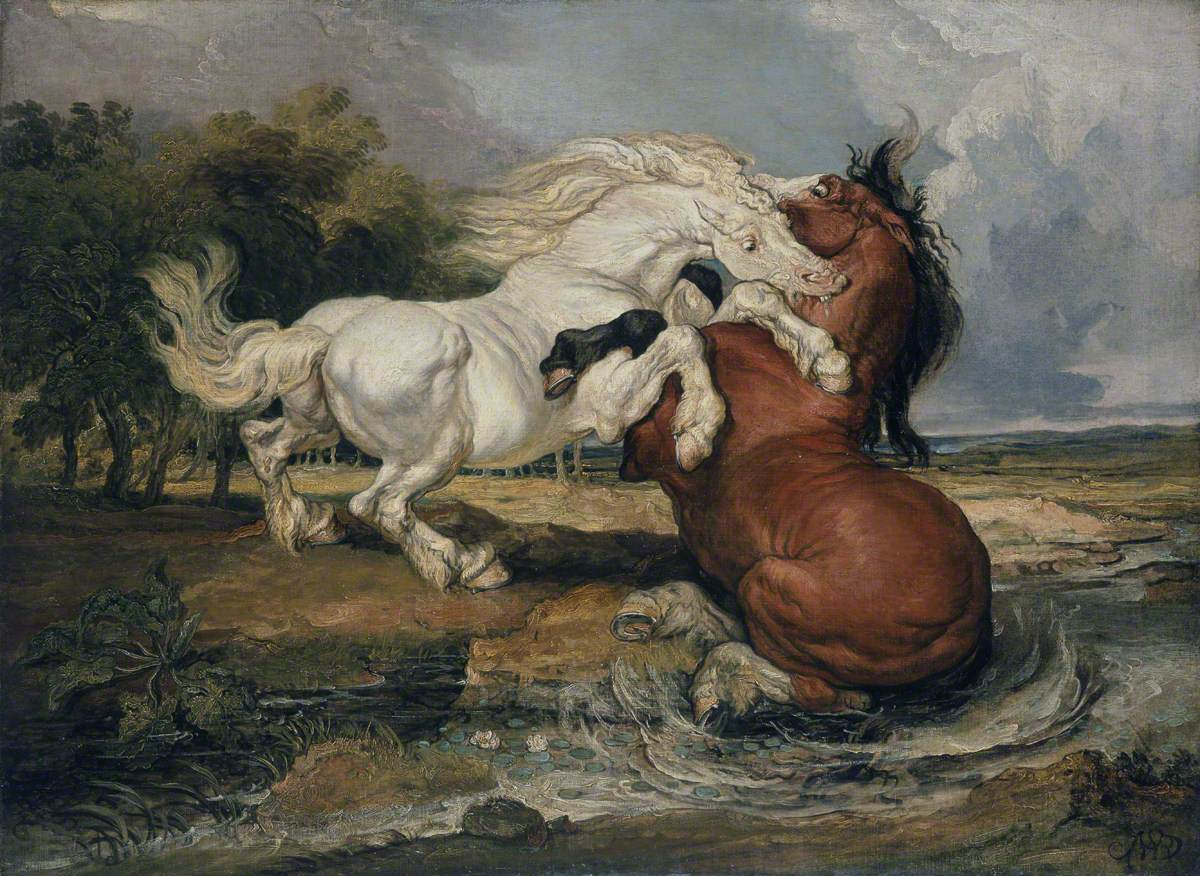
Fighting Horses by James Ward

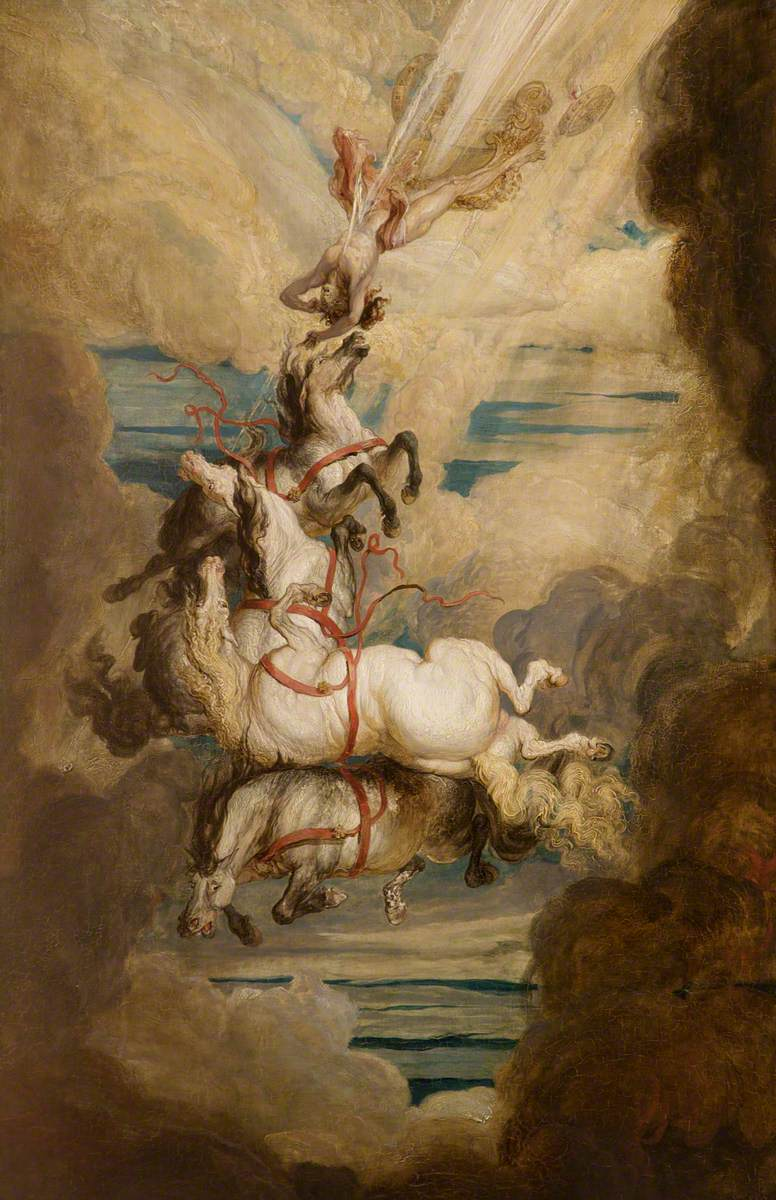
The Fall of Phaeton by James Ward

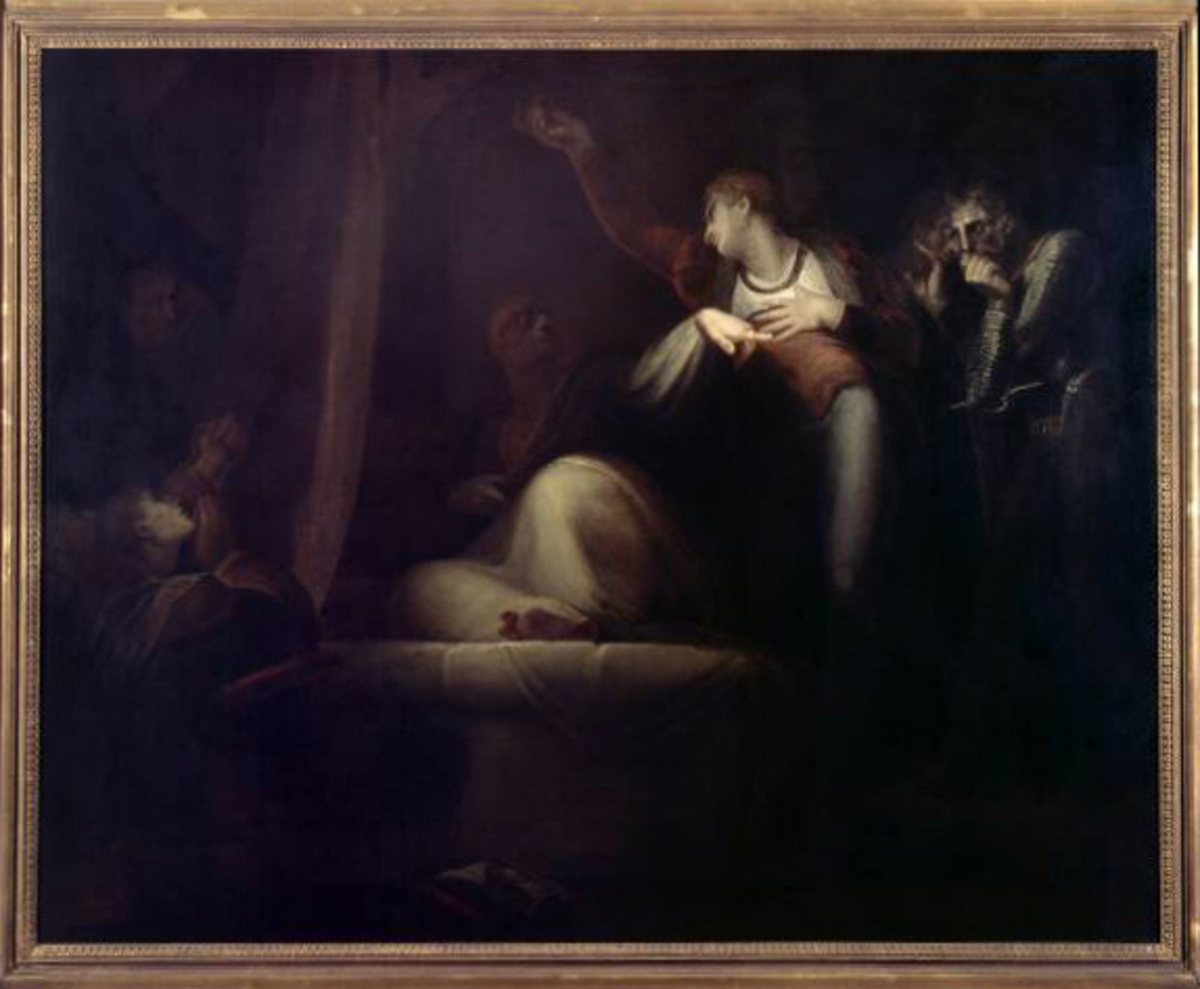
Cardinal Beaufort Terrified by the Supposed Apparition of Gloucester by Henry Fuseli

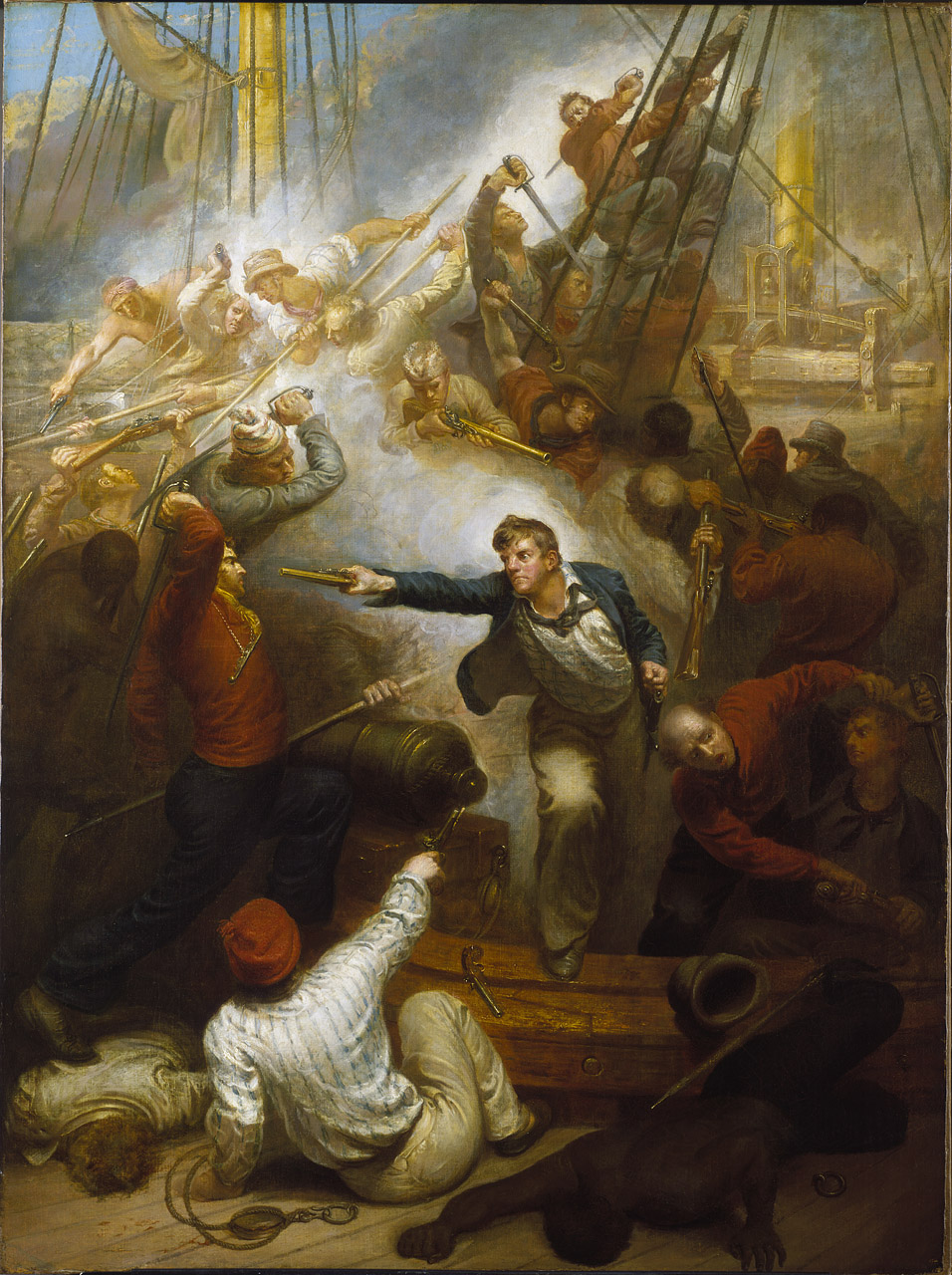
Captain William Rogers Capturing the Jeune Richard by Samuel Drummond

== See also ==
- Salon of 1808, a French art exhibition held at the Louvre in Paris

== Bibliography ==
- Albinson, Cassandra, Funnell, Peter & Peltz, Lucy. Thomas Lawrence: Regency Power and Brilliance. Yale University Press, 2010.
- Bailey, Anthony. John Constable: A Kingdom of his Own. Random House, 2012.
- Bailey, Anthony. J.M.W. Turner: Standing in the Sun. Tate Enterprises Ltd, 2013.
- Levey, Michael. Sir Thomas Lawrence. Yale University Press, 2005.
- Prown, Jules David. John Singleton Copley: In England, 1774-1815. National Gallery of Art, Washington, 1966.
- Reynolds, Graham. Constable's England. Metropolitan Museum of Art, 1983.
- Spencer-Longhurst, Paul. The Sun Rising Through Vapour: Turner's Early Seascapes. Third Millennium Information, 2003.
- Tromans, Nicholas. David Wilkie: The People's Painter. Edinburgh University Press, 2007.
