= Matthias Wolverley Attwood =

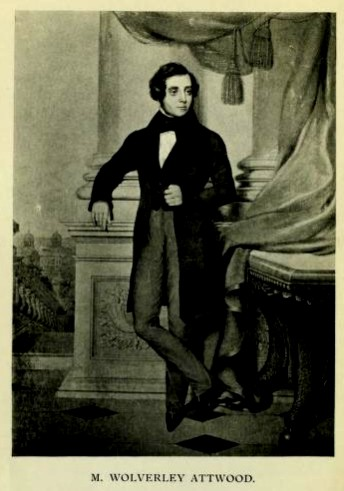

Matthias Wolverley Attwood (1808 – 17 September 1865) was a British businessman and Conservative Party politician.

He was the only son of Matthias Attwood (1779–1851), sometime Member of Parliament for Whitehaven, and his wife Susannah née Twells. He was descended from the Attwood family of Wolverley Court, Worcestershire.

He first entered politics at the 1835 general election when he stood unsuccessfully at Greenwich. At the next election in 1837 he was elected to the Commons as one of two members of parliament for Greenwich, alongside the Liberal, Edward George Barnard. At the next general election in which took place in June and July 1841 he chose not to stand at Greenwich again, instead contesting in turn the City of London and Kinsale without success. He subsequently contested a by-election at Sunderland in September 1841. The election was marked by riots, and Attwood was defeated by his Liberal opponent, Viscount Howick.

In 1851 he inherited his father's residences at Gracechurch Street in the City of London and Dulwich Hill House. He also inherited his business interests and shares, becoming a partner in the banking firm of Spooner, Attwoods and Company and chairman of the General Steam Navigation Company. In 1863 the bank was sold to Barclay, Bevan, Tritton and Company. In the following year he was asked by the City of London Conservative Registration Association to stand as a candidate in the forthcoming election, but he declined due to ill health.

He died, unmarried, at his Dulwich home, aged 57.

Parliament of the United Kingdom
Preceded by Edward George Barnard; John Angerstein	Member of Parliament for Greenwich; 1837 – 1841; With: Edward George Barnard	Succeeded by Edward George Barnard; James Whitley Deans Dundas
