= Portrait of William Pitt (Hoppner) =

1804 painting by Thomas Lawrence

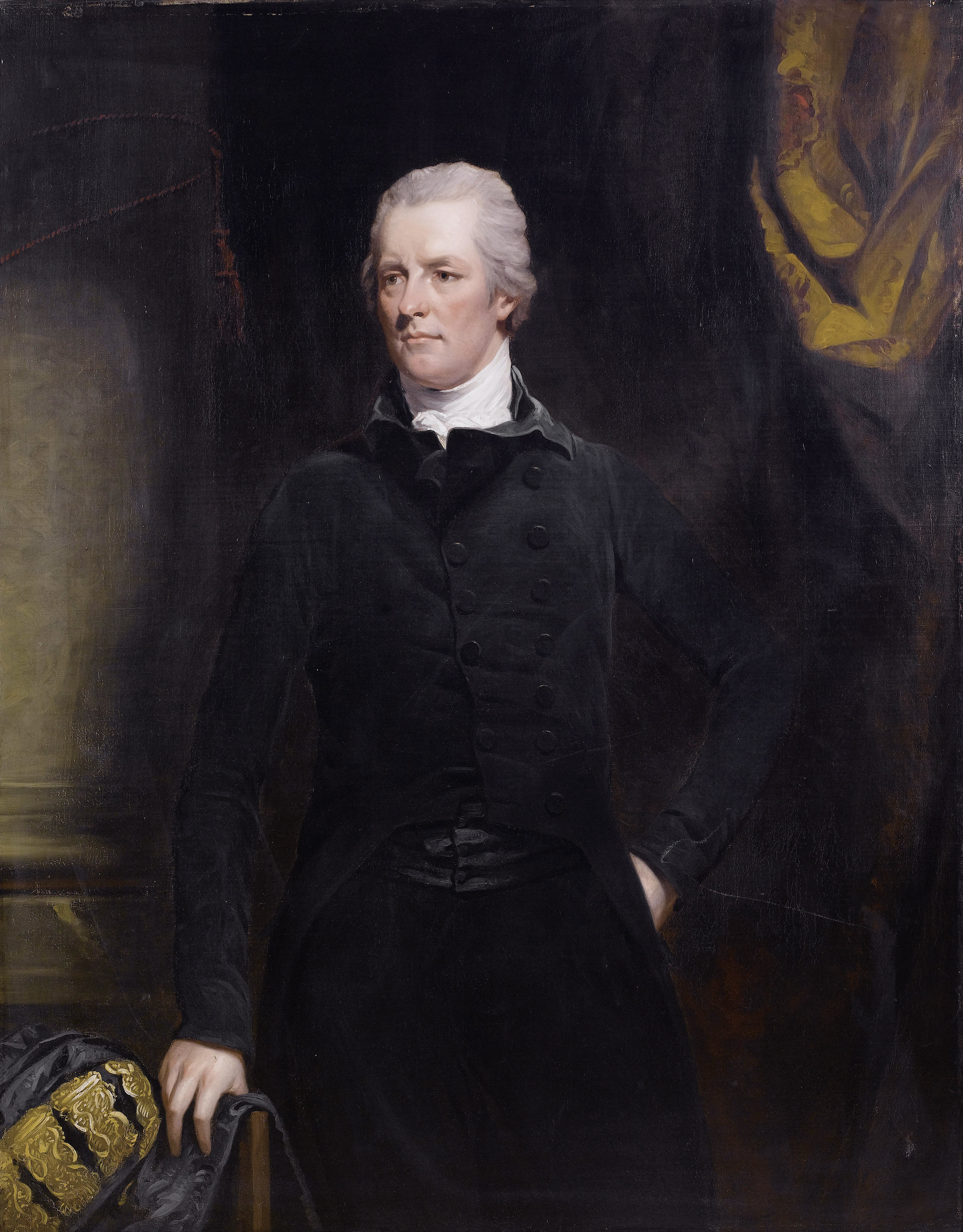
- Replica version produced by Hoppner's studio
- Artist: John Hoppner
- Year: 1804
- Type: Oil on canvas, portrait
- Dimensions: 141 cm × 108 cm (56 in × 43 in)
- Location: National Portrait Gallery, London

Portrait of William Pitt is an oil on canvas portrait painting by the English artist John Hoppner, from 1804. It depicts the British politician William Pitt the Younger.

== History and description ==
Pitt had first become Prime Minister in 1784. After a brief spell in opposition he returned to office in 1804. From 1792 Britain was at war during the French Revolutionary Wars and later Napoleonic conflict.

The original painting was commissioned by Lord Mulgrave, both an art collector and a colleague of Pitt who served as his Foreign Secretary. Multiple variations of the picture exist. A version produced by Hoppner's studio is today in the collection of the National Portrait Gallery, having been loaned by the Tate Gallery since 1954.

== See also ==
- Portrait of William Pitt, an 1807 painting by Hoppner's rival Thomas Lawrence

== Bibliography ==
- Crane, David. Romantics & Revolutionaries: Regency Portraits from the National Portrait Gallery London. National Portrait Gallery, 2002.
- Hague, William. William Pitt the Younger: A Biography. HarperCollins UK, 2012.
