= Edward George Barnard =

British shipbuilder and Liberal politician

Edward George Barnard (1778 – 14 June 1851) was a British shipbuilder and Liberal Party politician.

He was the son of William and Frances Barnard and baptised on 18 May 1778. He was a member of the Barnard family of shipbuilders who had established themselves at Deptford on the River Thames. He became very wealthy, and in 1824 he purchased Gosfield Hall and estate in Essex from the Marquess of Buckingham for 150,000 guineas.

He was elected at the 1832 general election as one of the two Members of Parliament (MPs) for the newly enfranchised borough of Greenwich. He was regarded as an "ultra-radical" who was in favour of the abolition of slavery, triennial parliaments, an ending of "taxes on knowledge" and the secret ballot. He held the seat until his death at his family seat in 1851, aged 73. He was buried in the family vault in Gosfield Parish Church on 21 June.

Parliament of the United Kingdom
New constituency	Member of Parliament for Greenwich; 1832–1851; With: James Dundas 1832–1835; John Angerstein 1835–1837; Matthias Wolverley Attwood 1837–1841; James Dundas	Succeeded by David Salomons; James Dundas
