= John Angerstein (MP) =

British politician (1774–1858)

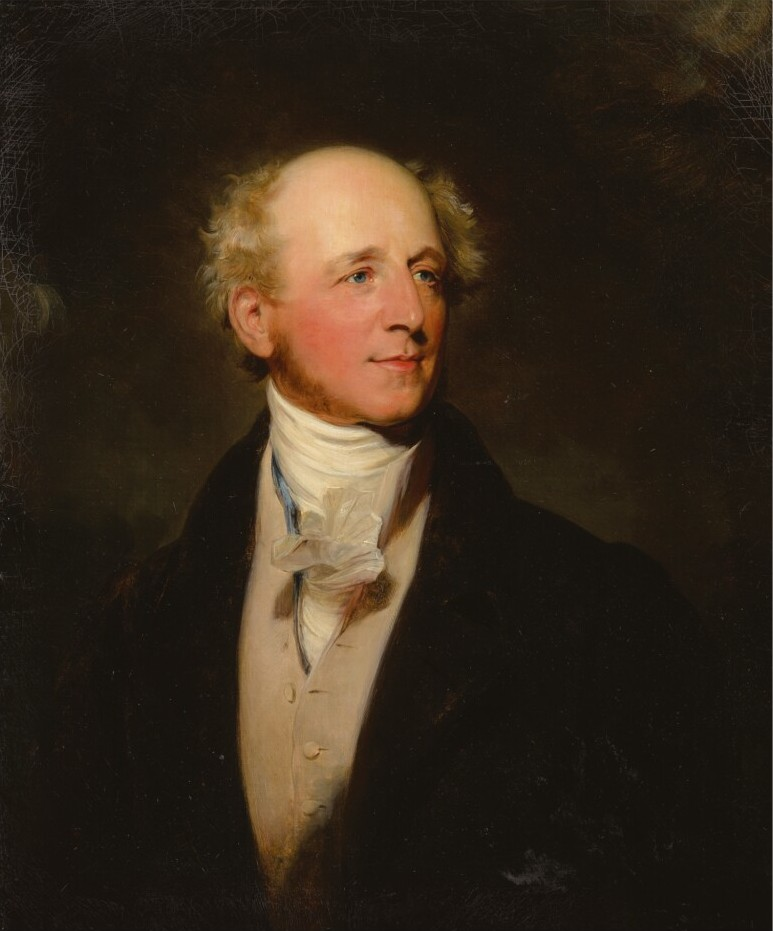
- Portrait by Thomas Lawrence, c. 1829

Member of Parliament for Greenwich
- In office January 1835 – 17 July 1837 Serving with Edward George Barnard
- Preceded by: James Dundas
- Succeeded by: M. Wolverley Attwood

Member of Parliament for Camelford
- In office May 1796 – 29 June 1802 Serving with William Joseph Denison

Personal details
- Born: c. 1774
- Died: 8 April 1858 (aged 83-84)
- Party: Whig
- Spouse: Amelia Locke (m. 1799)
- Children: 5, including William
- Parents: John Julius Angerstein (father); Anne Muilman (mother)
- Occupation: Politician

John Angerstein (c. 1774 – 8 April 1858) was an English Whig politician from Blackheath, London.

He was the only son of John Julius Angerstein, who had moved to London from Russia and made his fortune as a Lloyds underwriter.

He was elected at the 1796 general election as a Member of Parliament (MP) for borough of Camelford in Cornwall, holding the seat until the 1802 general election, when he left Parliament.

He was one of the three people nominated in November 1829 to be the High Sheriff of Kent for 1830–31, but the King picked Edward Rice instead. He was nevertheless appointed High Sheriff of Norfolk for 1831–32, when he lived at Weeting Hall.

He was re-elected to Parliament at the 1835 general election as an MP for Greenwich, having previously contested the seat unsuccessfully in 1832. He decided not to defend the seat at the 1837 general election, choosing instead to stand for Eastern Surrey. He failed to win that seat however.

He died in 1858. He had married Amelia, the daughter of William Locke of Norbury Park, Surrey, with whom he had three sons and two daughters.

Parliament of Great Britain
Preceded by Lord William Bentinck; William Smith	Member of Parliament for Camelford; 1796–1800; With: William Joseph Denison	Succeeded by Parliament of the United Kingdom
Parliament of the United Kingdom
Preceded by Parliament of Great Britain	Member of Parliament for Camelford; 1801–1802; With: William Joseph Denison	Succeeded by Robert Adair; John Fonblanque
Preceded by James Dundas; Edward George Barnard	Member of Parliament for Greenwich; 1835–1837; With: Edward George Barnard	Succeeded by Edward George Barnard; Matthias Wolverley Attwood
Honorary titles
Preceded by Hon. George Milles	High Sheriff of Norfolk; 1831	Succeeded by William Lyde Wiggett Chute
