= The Unpaid Bill =

Painting by J. M. W. Turner

- Artist: J. M. W. Turner
- Year: 1808
- Type: Oil on panel, genre painting
- Dimensions: 59.4 cm × 80 cm (23.4 in × 31 in)
- Location: Private collection

The Unpaid Bill is an 1808 genre painting by the British artist J.M.W. Turner. It features a scene where a dentist is reproving his son for his spendthrift ways. The painting was commissioned by the art collector Richard Payne Knight. It was Turner's only entry to the Royal Academy Exhibition of 1808 at Somerset House in London. It was hung nearby David Wilkie's The Card Players and was widely viewed as an attempt by Turner to challenge or upstage the young Wilkie. Critical reception was poor, with suggestions that his move away from his characteristic landscape paintings was a mistake. It was the only work he submitted to the Academy that year, prioritising exhibitions in his own studio in Queen Anne Street in Marylebone and the rival British Institution. Turner produced several genre paintings over the following few years including The Garreteer's Petition (1809) and Harvest Home (1809).

== See also ==
- List of paintings by J. M. W. Turner

== Bibliography ==
- Bailey, Anthony. J.M.W. Turner: Standing in the Sun. Tate Enterprises Ltd, 2013.
- Hamilton, James. Turner - A Life. Sceptre, 1998.
- Spencer-Longhurst, Paul. The Sun Rising Through Vapour: Turner's Early Seascapes. Third Millennium Information, 2003.
- Tromans, Nicholas. David Wilkie: The People's Painter. Edinburgh University Press, 2007.
