= John Julius Angerstein =

Russian-born British businessman and art collector (1735–1823)

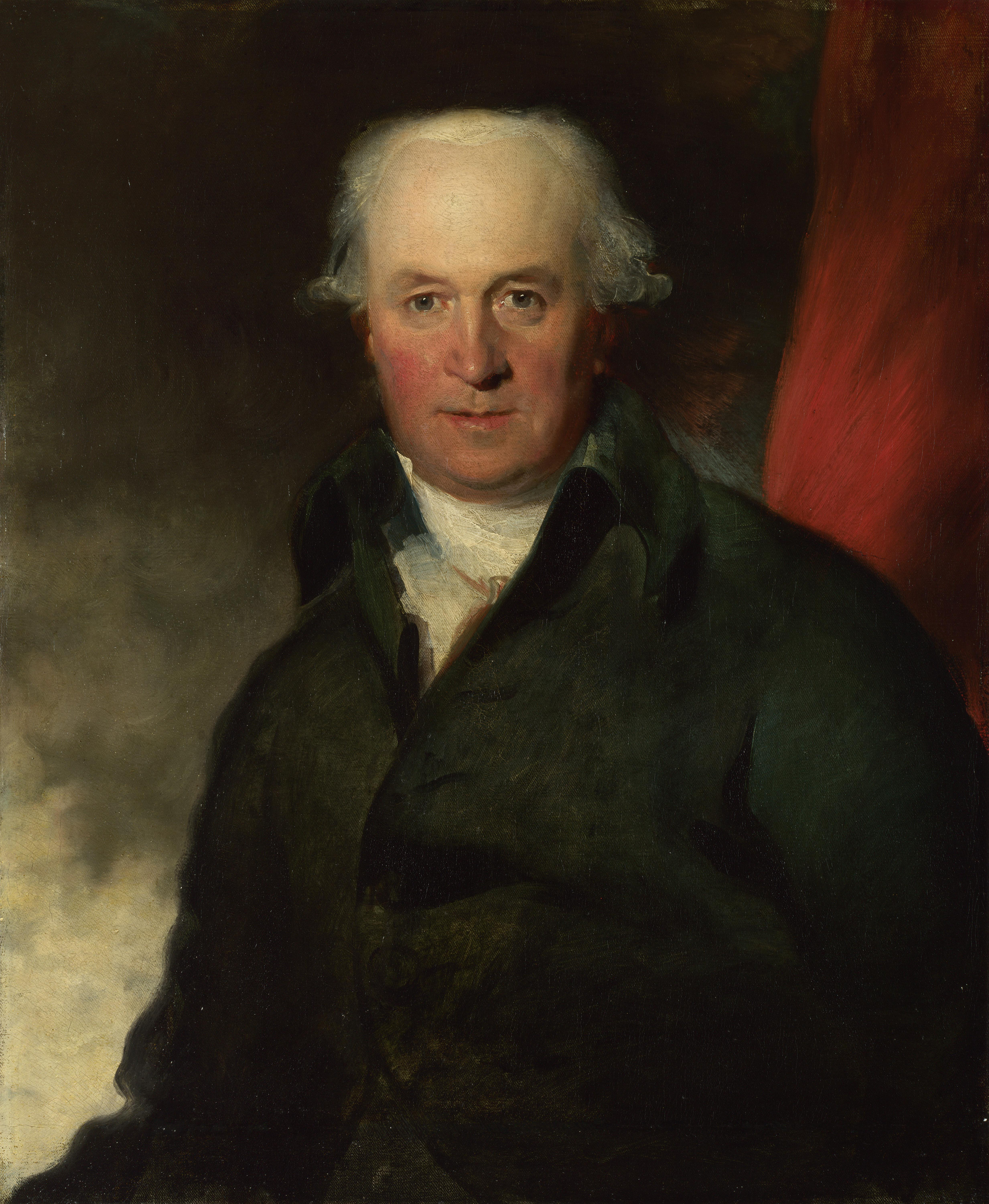
- Portrait by Thomas Lawrence, c. 1790
- Born: 1735; St. Petersburg, Russian Empire
- Died: 22 January 1823 (aged 87–88)
- Occupations: Merchant; underwriter
- Spouses: Anna Muilman Crockett (m. 1771; died 1783); Eliza Payne Lucas (m. 1785)
- Children: 2, including John

John Julius Angerstein (1735 – 22 January 1823) was a Russian-born British businessman and art collector who worked as an underwriter for Lloyd's of London. It was the prospect that his collection of paintings was about to be sold by his estate in 1824 that suddenly galvanised King George IV and British Prime Minister Lord Liverpool into purchasing his collection for the nation, which led to the founding of the National Gallery in Angerstein's house at 100 Pall Mall, London.

== Parentage ==
John Julius Angerstein was born in Saint Petersburg, Russia, in 1735. It has wrongly been suggested that he was a natural son of Empress Catherine II or of Elizabeth, Empress of Russia. Family tradition holds that his true parents were Empress Anna of Russia, then 42, and the London businessman Andrew Poulett Thompson; his first position after arriving in London c. 1749 at the age of fifteen was in Thompson's counting-house.

== Family ==
In 1771 Angerstein married Anna Crockett (widow of Charles Crockett and daughter of Henry Muilman [1700–1772], a South Sea Company director, banker, Danish consul in London and Russia Company consul, and Anne, née Darnall) at St Peter-le-Poer, Old Broad Street. They had two children – Juliana, who married General Nikolai Sablukov of the Russian service, and John Angerstein (1773–1858). (Note: A memorial in the church of St Nicholas at Bratton St Maur, near Wincanton, Somerset, describes a John Julius Angerstein who was born in 1843 and died in 1924 as the proprietor of nearby Holbrook House and says he worshipped in the church of St Nicholas, but also records his having died in Norfolk; this is presumably John Richard Julius Angerstein, a grandson of John Angerstein, MP.)

Anna died in 1783, and in 1785 John Julius Angerstein married Eliza Lucas (daughter of the Rev. Joseph Payne and widow of Thomas Lucas, a director of the South Sea Company and president of Guy's Hospital. She was also a slave-plantation in St Kitts slave-owner and Angerstein benefitted from her annuity secured at least until the likely sale or restructuring of the annuity in 1789. A portrait of Angerstein and his second wife, Eliza, by Thomas Lawrence was exhibited at the Royal Academy in 1792 (now held by The Louvre museum, Paris).

== Life and art collection ==
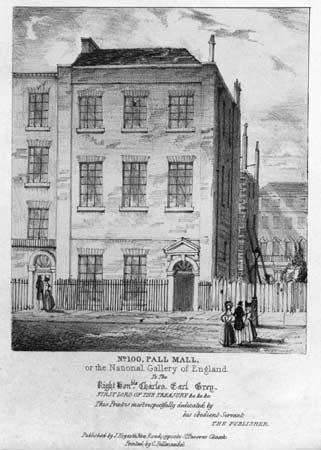
Angerstein's house at 100 Pall Mall, the first National Gallery

In his role as a merchant Angerstein has been said to have owned a third share in slave estates in Grenada, but this assertion is incorrect. The only evidence of his involvement in slave-owning plantations (and the likely basis of the fallacy) was indirect, and not financial. Angerstein's friend and client, George Peters, was owed money by the merchant Israel Wilkes. Angerstein and two others were made trustees for the creditors over Wilkes' assets, including two sugar estates in Grenada. Moreover, as a marine insurer, Angerstein also insured vessels involved in the slave trade.

Angerstein was chairman of Lloyd's from 1790 to 1796 and counted King George III, British Prime Minister William Pitt the Younger and artist Sir Thomas Lawrence (Note: Lawrence's double portrait of Angerstein and his wife is conserved in the Louvre Museum.) among his friends. He was also on the Committee for the Relief of the Black Poor, an organisation with strong abolitionist connections.

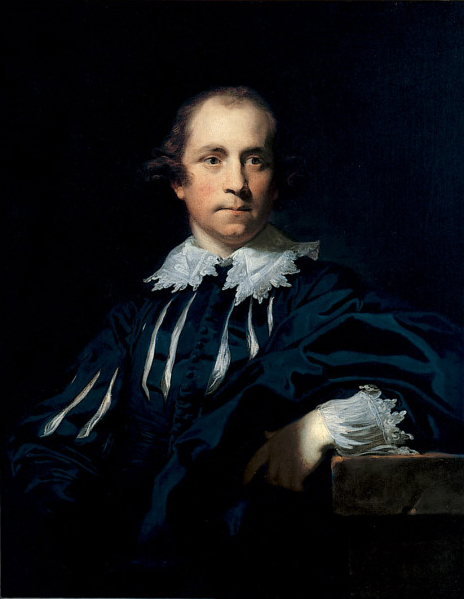
John Julius Angerstein, 1765, by Joshua Reynolds, wearing "Van Dyck dress" in imitation of the 17th-century paintings of Anthony van Dyck.

After a number of knife attacks on women by the so-called "London Monster", Angerstein promised a reward of £100 for capture of the perpetrator.

Among his earliest art purchases was The Rape of the Sabines by Rubens. Later acquisitions included works by Rembrandt, Velázquez, Titian, Raphael, Correggio and Hogarth, plus early drawings by J. M. W. Turner. From the sale in London of the French Orleans Collection he bought The Raising of Lazarus by Sebastiano del Piombo and other works. After his death, thirty-eight of his finest paintings were bought by the British government for £60,000 to form the nucleus of the collection of the British National Gallery. Until the National Gallery was built in Trafalgar Square in London, the 38 works from Angerstein's collection were displayed in Angerstein's town house in Pall Mall.

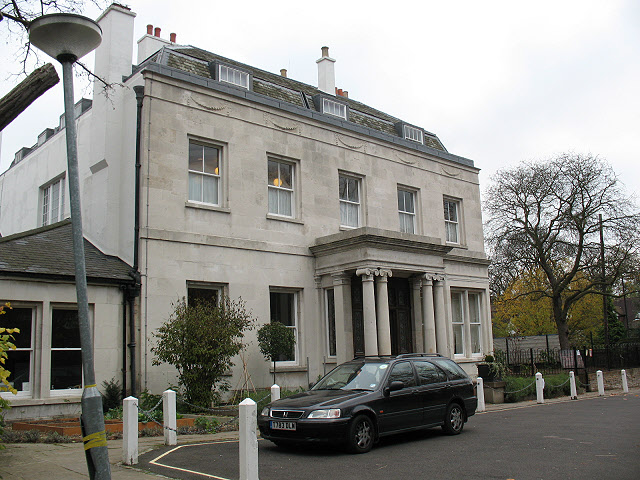
The house Woodlands in 2020

He lived for some years in Greenwich in south-east London, leasing a 54-acre (22 ha) estate from Sir Gregory Page in 1774 and over the next two years building a house, Woodlands (designed by local architect George Gibson). This area is now known as Westcombe Park, part of a wide area on the north-eastern fringes of Blackheath that he sought to enclose in 1801. The house fell empty in 1870 when John's grandson William Angerstein relinquished the lease.

In 1806 Angerstein served as vice-president of the newly formed London Institution, and the previous year became a founding governor of the British Institution for Promoting the Fine Arts in the United Kingdom. Following the death of William Pitt the Younger in 1806, he commissioned Thomas Lawrence to paint a portrait of the former Prime Minister which is now in the Waterloo Chamber of Windsor Castle. As an active church-goer, he worshipped at St Alfege's Church, Greenwich, where he was also churchwarden.

== Connections today ==
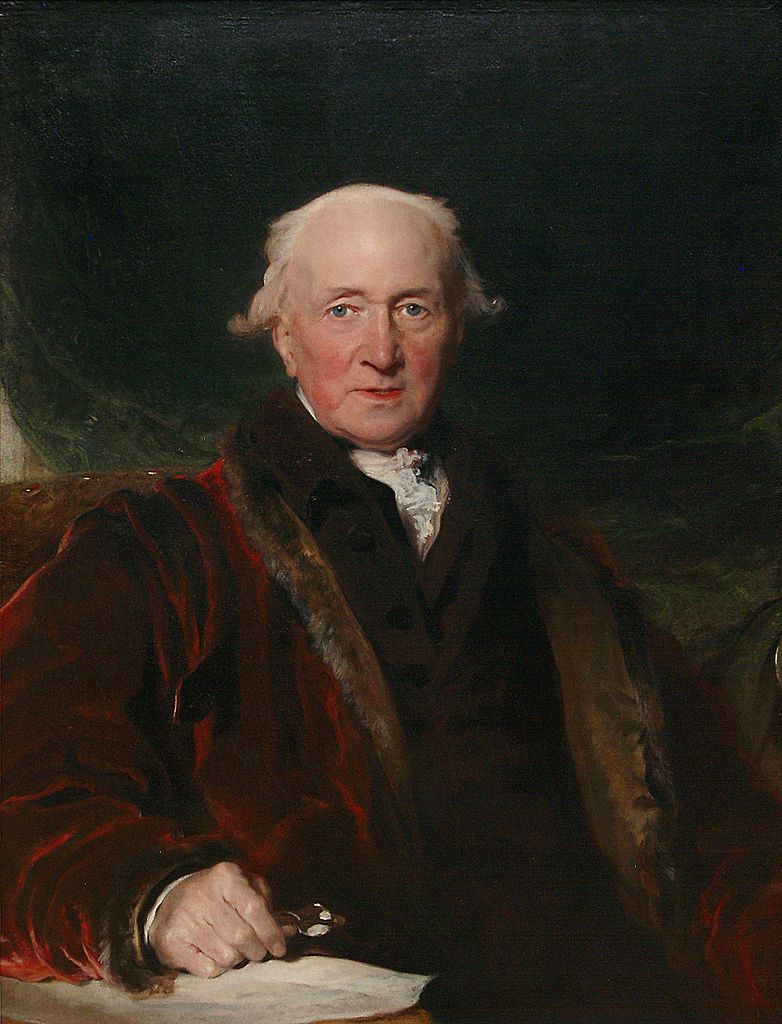
Posthumous portrait, commissioned from Thomas Lawrence in 1824 and delivered in 1828

His family's connections with Greenwich are still commemorated. Angerstein Lane, near the heath at Blackheath, bears the family name. A public house, The Angerstein Hotel, is on Woolwich Road, Greenwich, close to the Woolwich Road flyover (Blackwall Tunnel A102 southern approach) – on the opposite side of which lies the Angerstein Business Park (owned by Greenwich Enterprise Board). East of this is the Angerstein Railway Line (almost solely used for commercial freight, mainly sea-dredged aggregate landed at Angerstein Wharf, operated by Aggregate Industries), linking the peninsula at North Greenwich with the main railway network; as a result, an area of largely industrial land in between the lines, and to the east of the A102 road, is sometimes referred to as the "Angerstein Triangle."
