= Romanesque Revival architecture in the United Kingdom =

18th to 19th century architectural style

Romanesque Revival, Norman Revival or Neo-Norman styles of building in the United Kingdom were inspired by the Romanesque architecture of the 11th and 12th centuries AD.

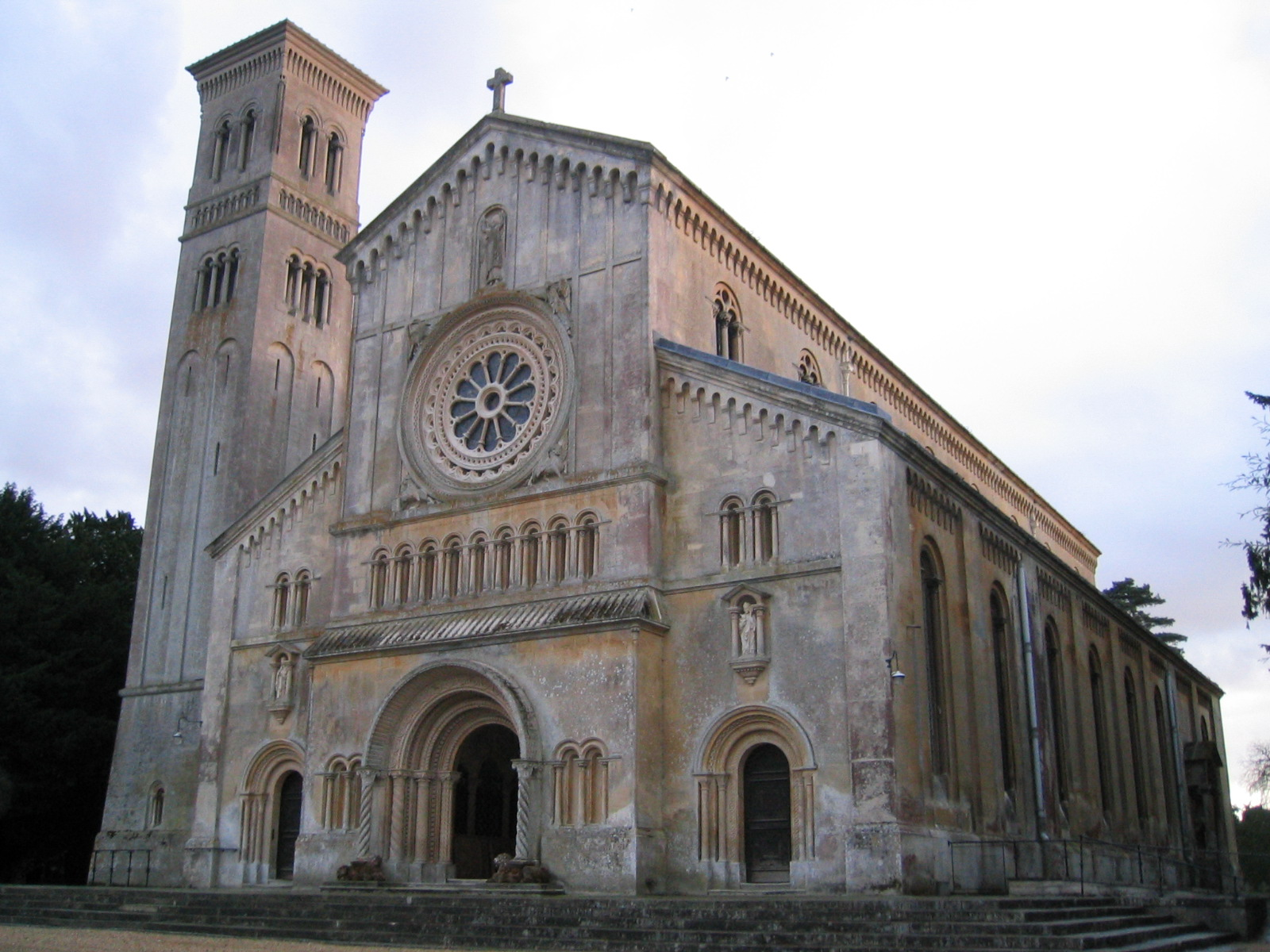
Church of St Mary and St Nicholas, Wilton, Wiltshire, by TH Wyatt, 1841–4

In the United Kingdom it started to appear as an architectural style in the 18th century but reached its greatest popularity in the mid to latter years of the 19th century. The style can be viewed as a strand of Gothic Revival architecture and part of the Historicist or Historismus styles of architecture that became popular in both Europe and Britain during the 19th century. Early examples of the style in Germany of the 1820s and 1830s are referred to as Rundbogenstil or round arched style. In Britain the style was introduced by architects and their patrons, who had been on tours in Europe and it appears that the German and British styles of Romanesque developed largely independently. Initially in Britain the style was used for church building, but as the 19th century progressed it was adapted for public buildings, museums, schools and commercial buildings, but rarely for domestic buildings. By the start of the 20th century it had gone out of fashion and only occasionally were examples of the style built.

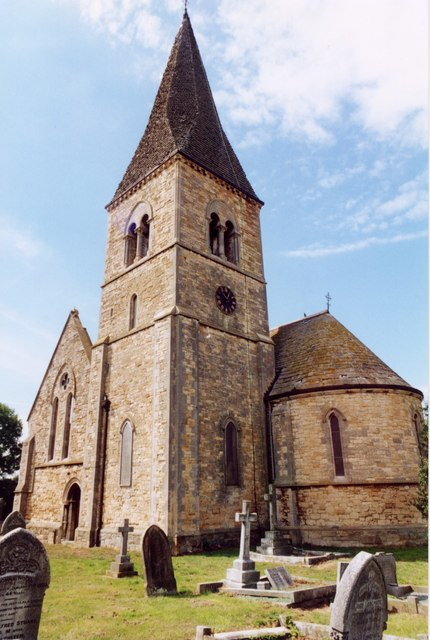
Aubourn Church, Lincolnshire, 1862–3

== Origins ==
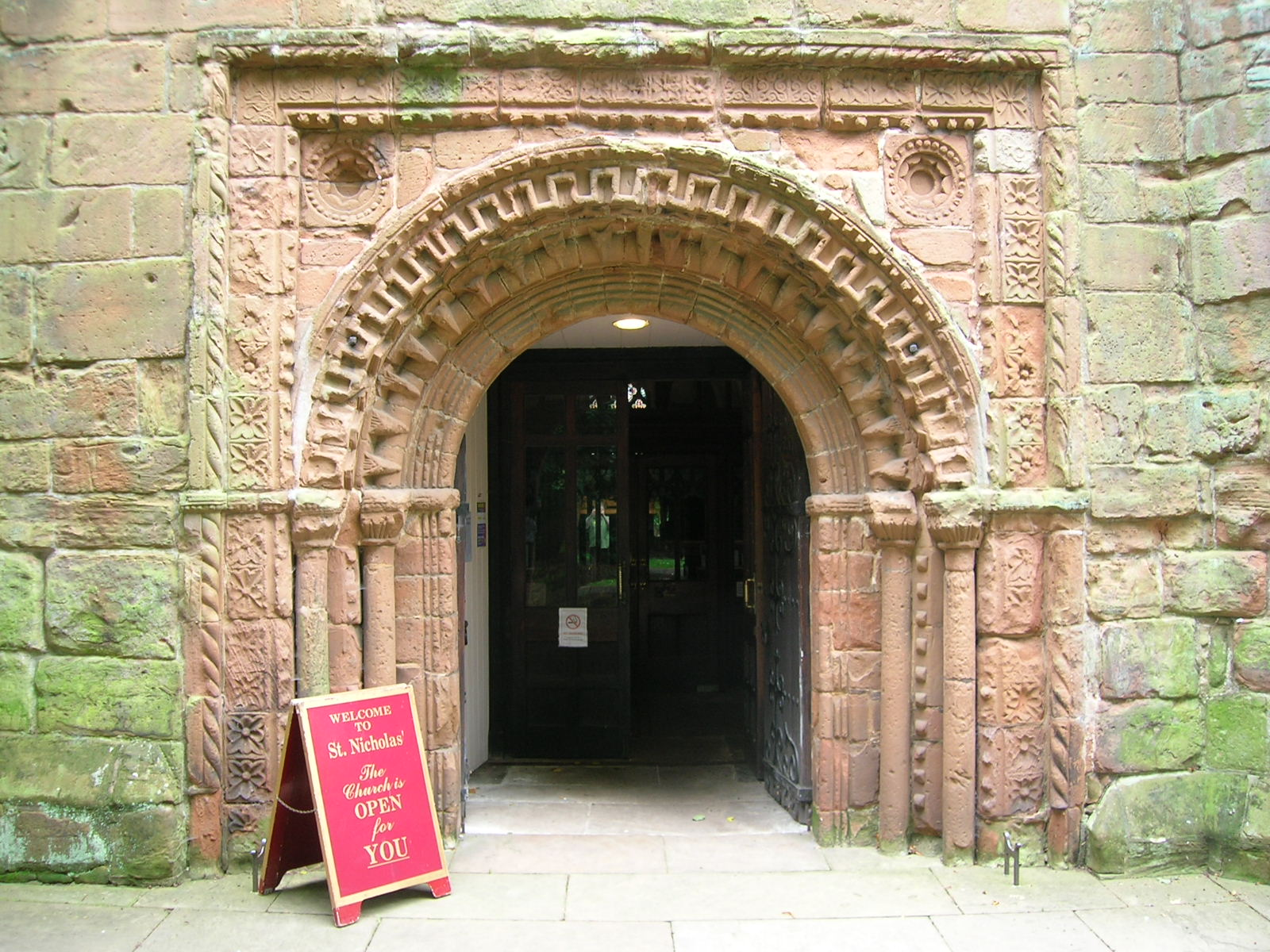
St. Nicholas, Kenilworth, west door 1570

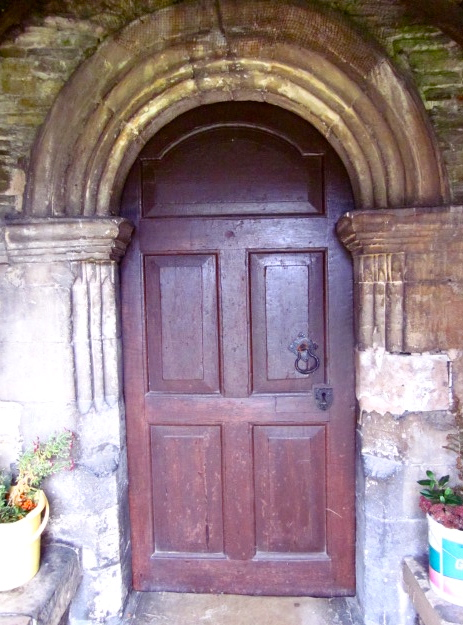
North Scarle, Lincolnshire

The development of the Norman revival style or Neo-Norman took place over a long time in the British Isles starting with Inigo Jones‘s re-fenestration of the White Tower of the Tower of London in 1637–38 and work at Windsor Castle by Hugh May for Charles II, but this was little more than restoration work. More surprising is the west door of Kenilworth Church, inserted in the tower in 1570 probably at the time of a visit of Queen Elizabeth. This appears to have been historic arch, sourced possibly from an unknown monastic building, Another early example of Romanesque revival is the south porch of North Scarle Church in Lincolnshire. Pevsner suggests that it might be Elizabethan, but late 17th century seems more likely as the oak door seems to be original and probably of that date.

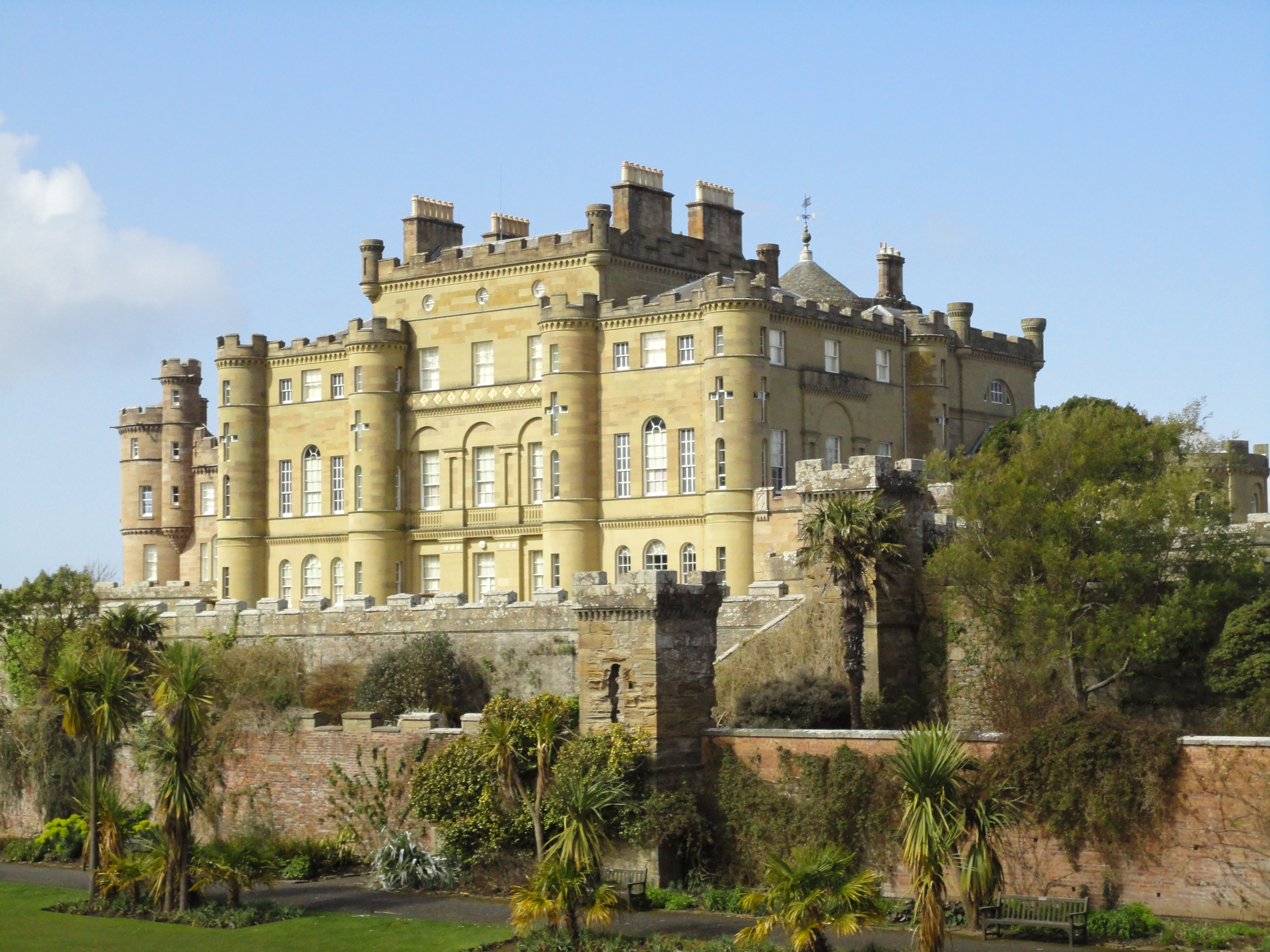
Culzean Castle by Robert Adam, 1771

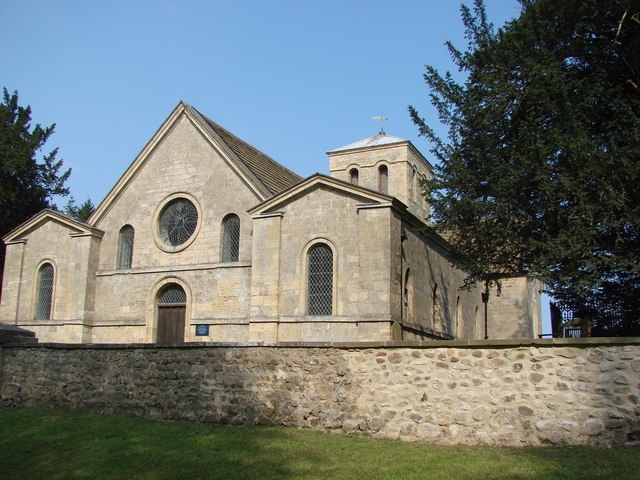
St Martin's Church, Allerton Mauleverer. - by John Vardy, 1745

In the 18th century the use of round arched windows was thought of as being Saxon rather than Norman and examples of buildings with round arched windows include Shirburn Castle in Oxfordshire, Wentworth in Yorkshire and Enmore Castle in Somerset. At Allerton Mauleverer in Yorkshire St Martin’s Church was re-built for Richard Arundell in 1745. The church has been described as a proto-Neo-Norman. While it gives the impression of a Romanesque revival church, with a massive crossing tower and round headed windows, yet it also has windows with gothic tracery and a hammerbeam nave roof. The architect is thought to have been John Vardy surveyor to the Office of Works.

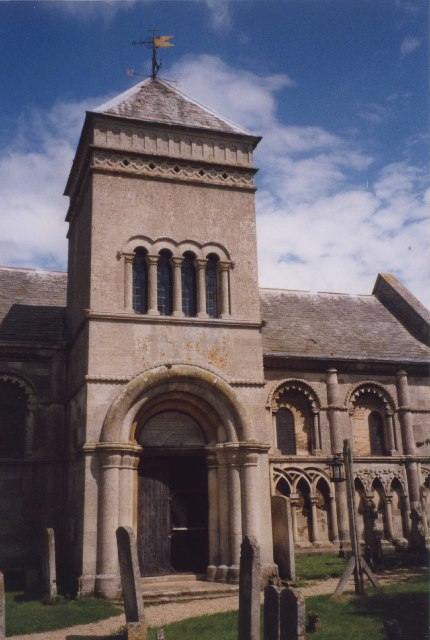
Tickencote Church 1792 Early example of church Romanesque revival

A further example of church building in the Romanesque revival style took place in 1792 when Elisa Wingfield commissioned plans from Samuel Pepys Cockerell for the conservation and rebuilding of St Peter's Church, Tickencote in Rutland. The church which contained much notable Romanesque decoration and an elaborate chancel arch appears to have been close to collapse. Cockerell encased the chancel, keeping the arch in position but the outer walls were completely re-built and the exterior ornamentation of arcades and round headed windows were replaced in new stonework. A new tower over a porch was built on the south side, which gave added stability to the older structure. The nave was completely re-built using some new romanesque mot is and copying others, such as the engaged columns, from those on the exterior of the chancel. This style of Romanesque revival architecture is very similar to the style that emerges in the 1840s under architectects such as Thomas Penson and Benjamin Ferrey. Tickencote could be considered to mark the start of the Romanesque revival in church architecture.

In Scotland the style started to emerge with the Duke of Argyll’s castle at Inverary, started in 1744, and castles by Robert Adam at Culzean (1771), Oxenfoord (1780–2), Dalquharran (1782–5), and Seton Palace (1792). In England James Wyatt used round arched windows at Sandleford Priory, Berkshire in 1780–79 and the Duke of Norfolk started to rebuild Arundel Castle, while Eastnor Castle in Herefordshire was built by Robert Smirke between 1812 and 1820.

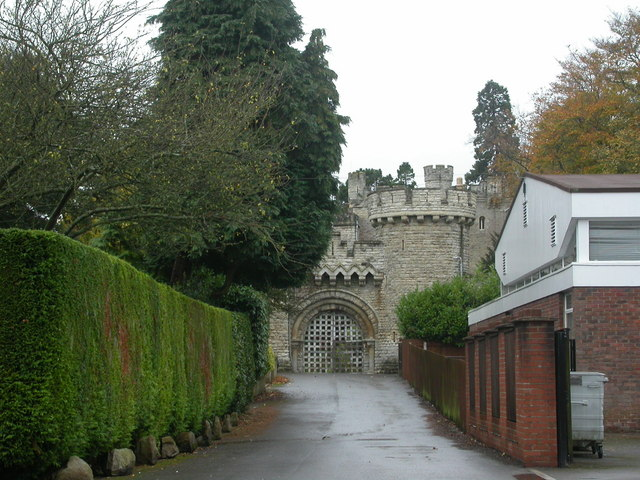
Entrance, Devizes Castle c.1840

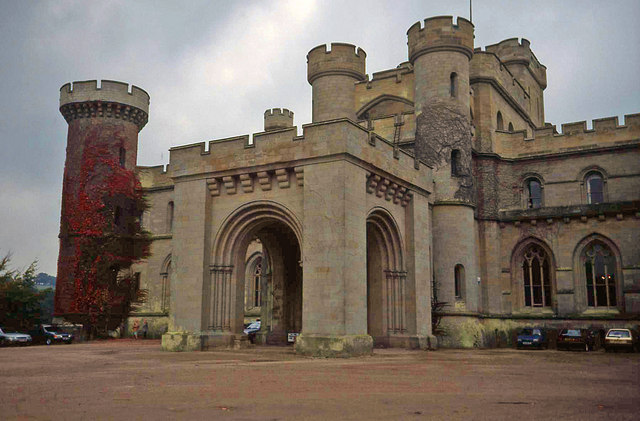
Front entrance to Eastnor Castle, Herefordshire, combining Romanesque and Gothic features, 1812–20

At Eastnor Smirke combines a rugged Romanesque with more subtle Gothic window tracery. The elements of Eastnor are further developed about 1840 at Devizes Castle, where the Bath architect Henry Goodridge combines the Castellated gothic style of Eastnor with a Romanesque entrance arch and Romanesque windows.

== Development of archaeologically correct Romanesque ==
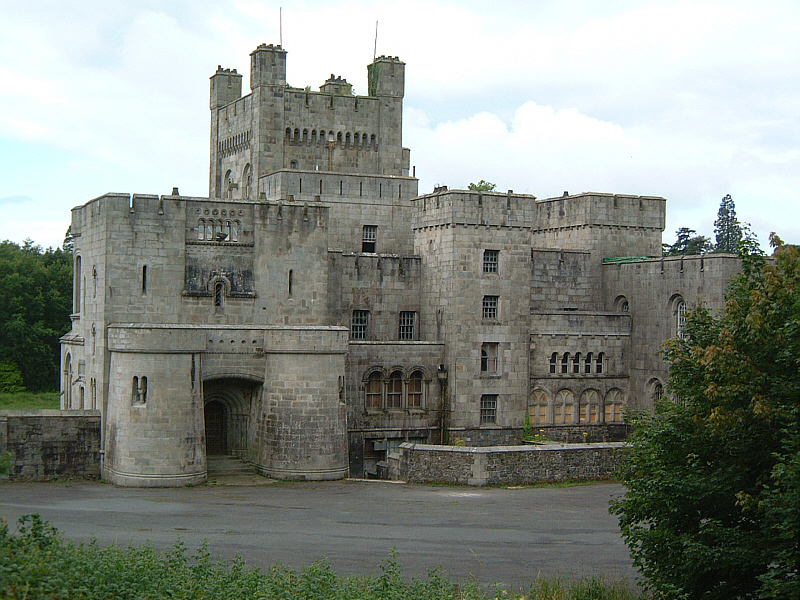
GosfordCastle, Armagh by Thomas Hopper

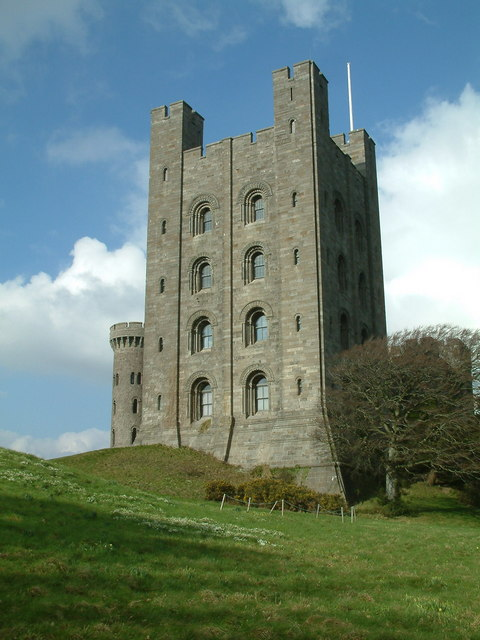
Penrhyn Castle, by Thomas Hopper, 1820–37

It was at this point that the Norman Revival became a recognisable architectural style. In 1817 Thomas Rickman published his An Attempt to Discriminate the Styles of English Architecture from the Conquest to the Reformation. It was now realised that round-arch architecture was largely Romanesque in the British Isles and came to be described as Norman rather than Saxon. This distinction was finally recognised when Rickman’s article in Archaeologia (1832–33), was published by the Society of Antiquaries. The start of an archaeologically correct Norman Revival can be recognised in the architecture of Thomas Hopper. His first attempt at this style was at Gosford Castle in Armagh in Ireland, but far more successful was his Penrhyn Castle near Bangor in North Wales. This was built for the Pennant family, between 1820 and 1837.

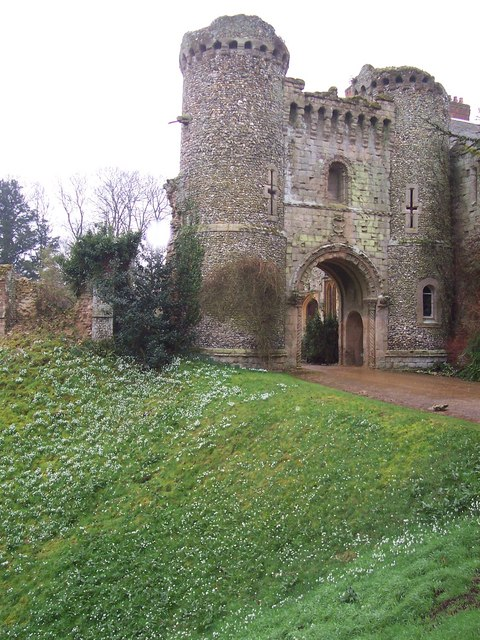
Bennington Lordship Castle Gateway

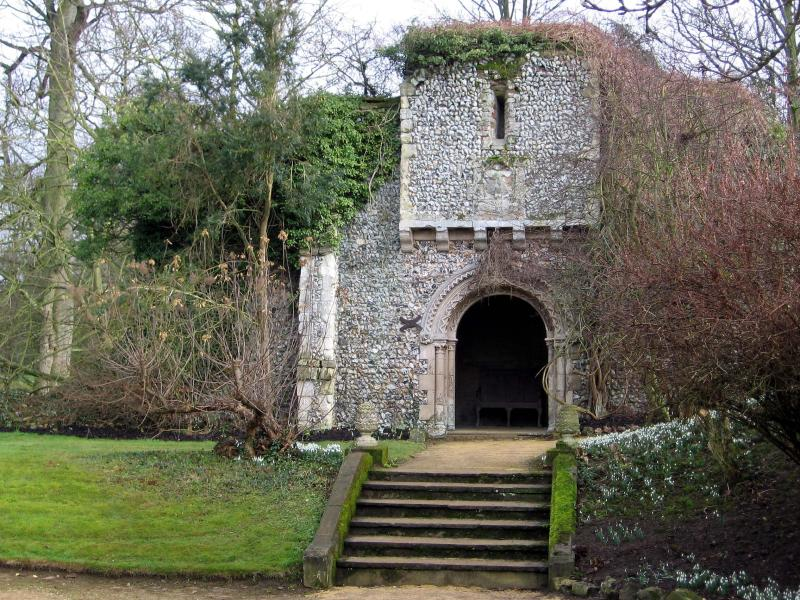
Benington Lordship Summerhouse

An example of Romanesque revival architecture being used for follies in 1832 was by George Proctor at Benington Lordship in Hertfordshire. Proctor added a neo-Norman gatehouse, summerhouse and curtain wall to the site of a Motte-and-bailey castle. The arches and decorative features to the gatehouse and summerhouse were in Pulhamite, a form of cast stone that was manufactured by James Pulham and Son.

The Neo-Norman style did not catch on for domestic buildings, though many country houses and mock castles were built in the Castle Gothic or Castellated style during the Victorian period, which were mixed Gothic styles.

== Church architecture and the Romanesque Revival ==
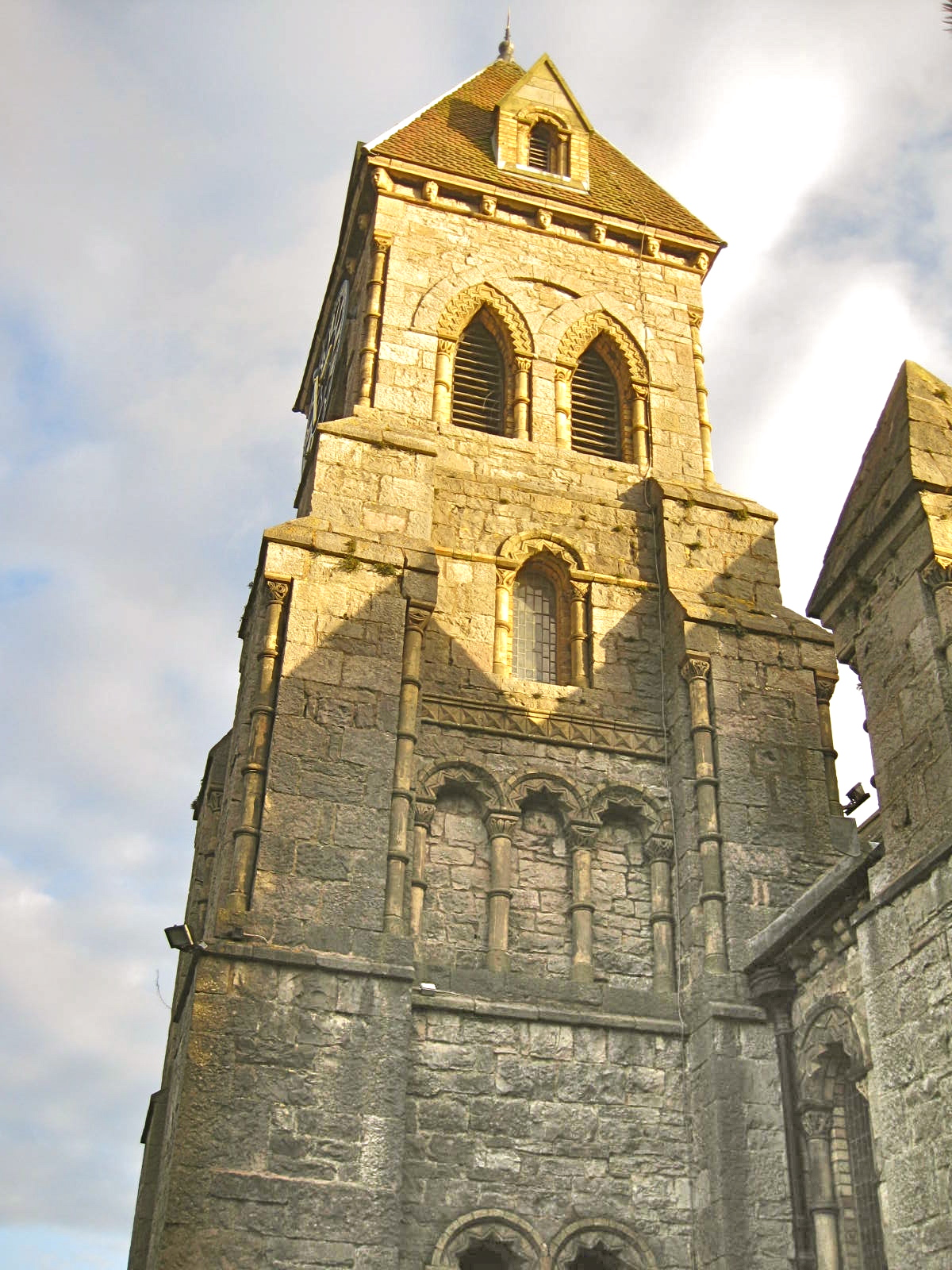
St Agatha, Llanymynech. Romanesque Tower by Penson 1845

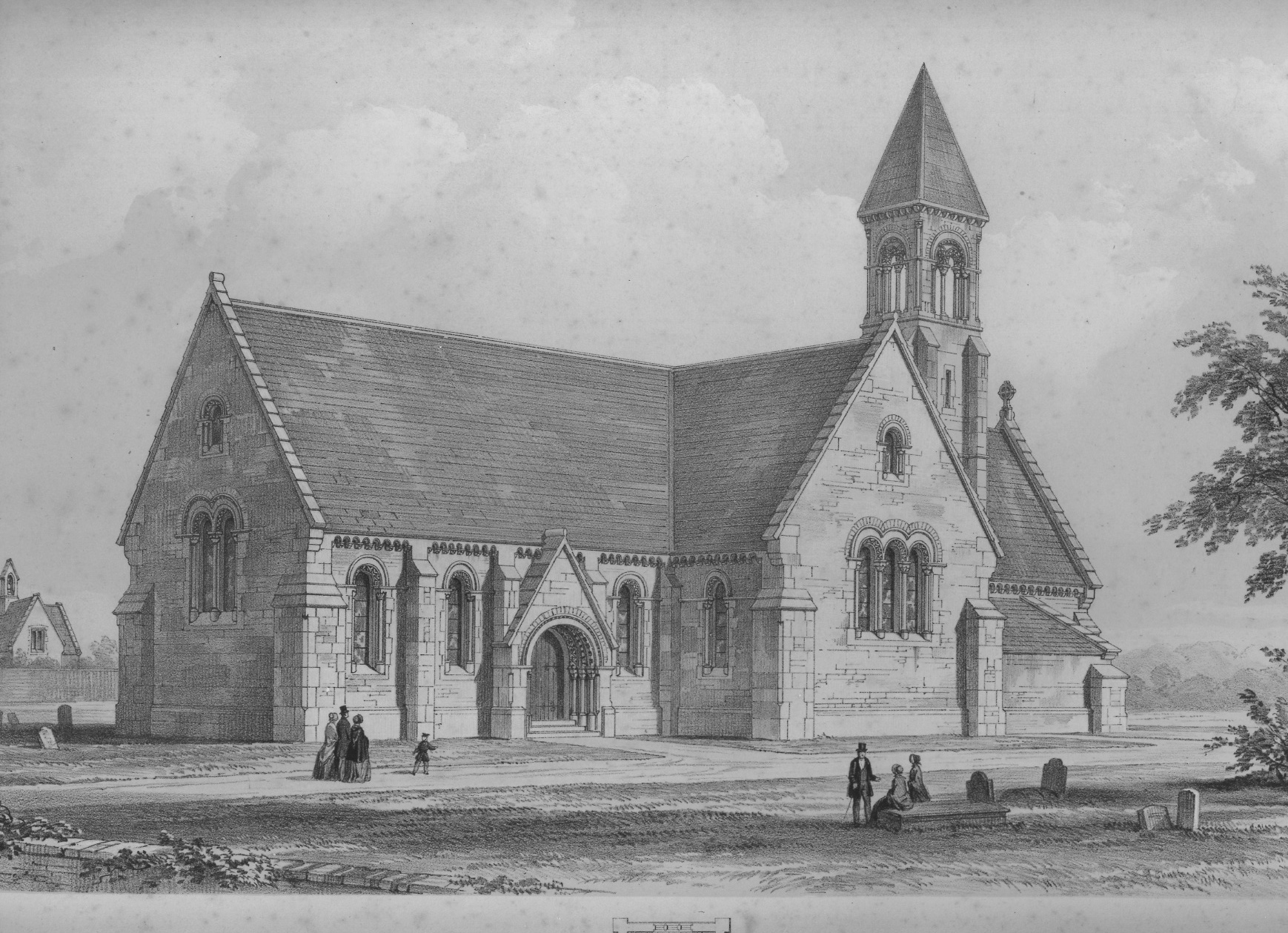
Rhosllanerchrugog Church, 1852

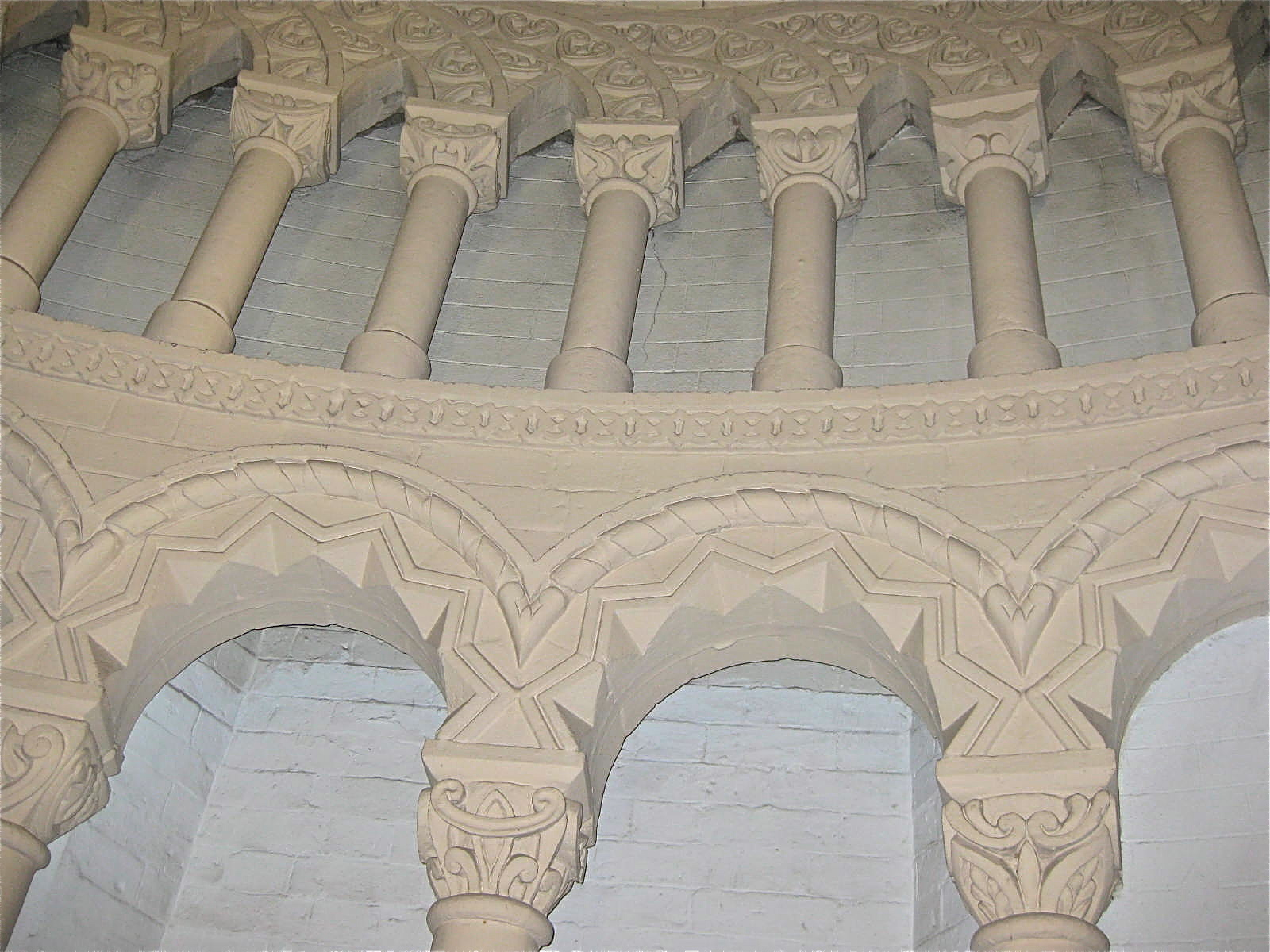
Christ Church, Welshpool. Chancel arcade in apse behind altar

However, the Norman Revival did catch on for church architecture. It was Thomas Penson, a Welsh architect, who would have been familiar with Hopper’s work at Penrhyn, who developed Romanesque Revival church architecture. Penson was influenced by French and Belgian Romanesque architecture, and particularly the earlier Romanesque phase of German Brick Gothic. At St David’s Newtown, 1843–47 and St Agatha’s Llanymynech, 1845, he copies the tower of St. Salvator's Cathedral, Bruges. Other examples of Romanesque revival by Penson are Christ Church, Welshpool, 1839–1844, and the porch to Langedwyn Church. He was an innovator in the use of terracotta to produce decorative Romanesque mouldings, saving on the expense of stonework. Penson’s last church in the Romanesque Revival style was Rhosllannerchrugog, Wrexham of 1852

=== Sara Losh and Wreay Church ===
A most remarkable example of Romanesque church building was St Mary’s Church at Wreay, near Carlisle. This was designed by Sara Losh and built between 1841 and 1842. Losh had travelled widely on the Continent and particularly in Italy and drew inspiration from Romanesque sources. Losh is known to have read Thomas Hope's Historical Study of Architecture (1815), which uses the term Lombardic for the style brought into Italy from the early Christian churches of Constantinople, and she described St Mary's as being an unpolished mode of building that most approximates to early Saxon or modified Lombard This statement suggests that at the time of its design Losh was not aware of Thomas Rickman’s re-classification of Saxon and Norman architecture. While the appearance and layout of the church may be considered as Romanesque, her free interpretation of the decoration on the woodwork and the arched stone windows and doors is anticipating the styles of the Arts and Crafts movement, while the arcading of the apse certainly has a Byzantine feel to it.

=== Sarah Losh gallery ===
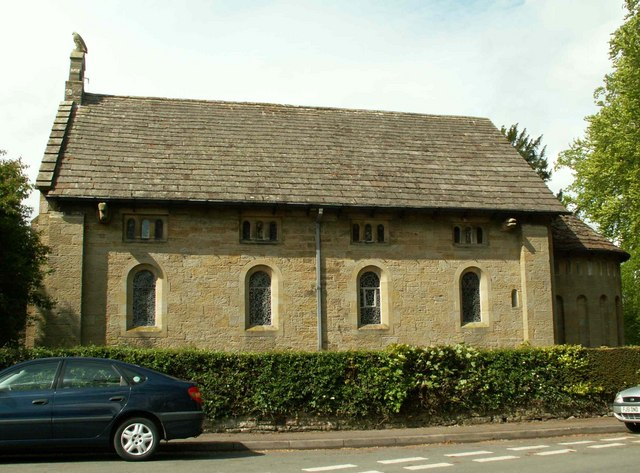
South side of St Mary's Church, Wreay

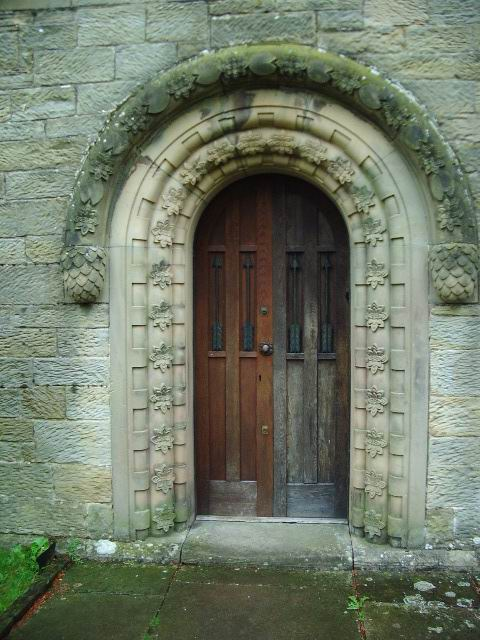
Main door of St Mary's Church

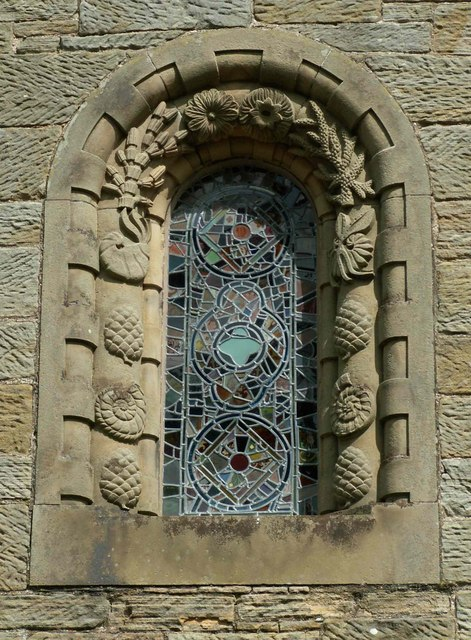
A window of St Mary's Church, surrounded with reliefs of shells and pine cones

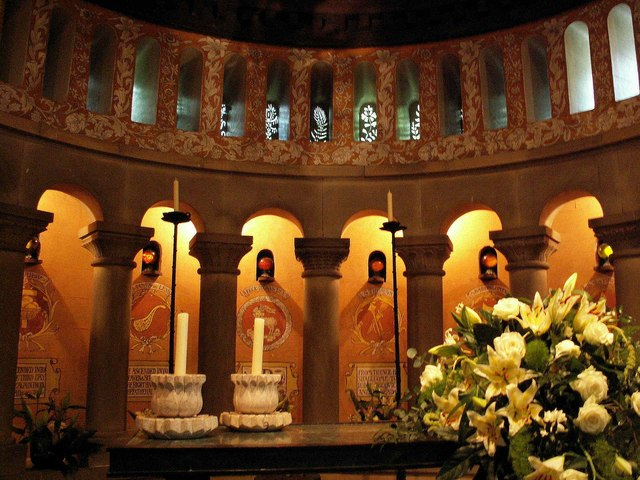
Inside St Mary's arcaded, apsidal chancel

== Other Early Victorian architects working in the Romanesque revival style ==
The early years of the 1840s saw a considerable upsurge of interest in the developing Romanesque revival style by some of the leading architects of the period. During the 19th century the architecture selected for Anglican churches depended on the churchmanship of particular congregations. Whereas high churches and Anglo-Catholic, which were influenced by the Oxford Movement, were built in Gothic Revival architecture; low churches and Broad churches of the period were often built in the Romanesque Revival style. The architects specialising in Romanesque revival took their designs from different local styles of the European Romanesque.

=== Edmund Sharpe ===
Another architect who popularised the Romanesque revival style was Edmund Sharpe, who set up his practice at Lancaster in 1835. At Cambridge he had been a great friend of William Whewell and presumably of the polymath and architectural historian Professor Robert Willis. He was awarded a travelling scholarship to study the early architecture of Germany and Southern France and supplied Thomas Rickman with information. However, Sharpe despite being an architectural historian of some note, built churches that were much freer interpretations of the Romanesque and German Brick Gothic and might be considered less archaeologically correct.

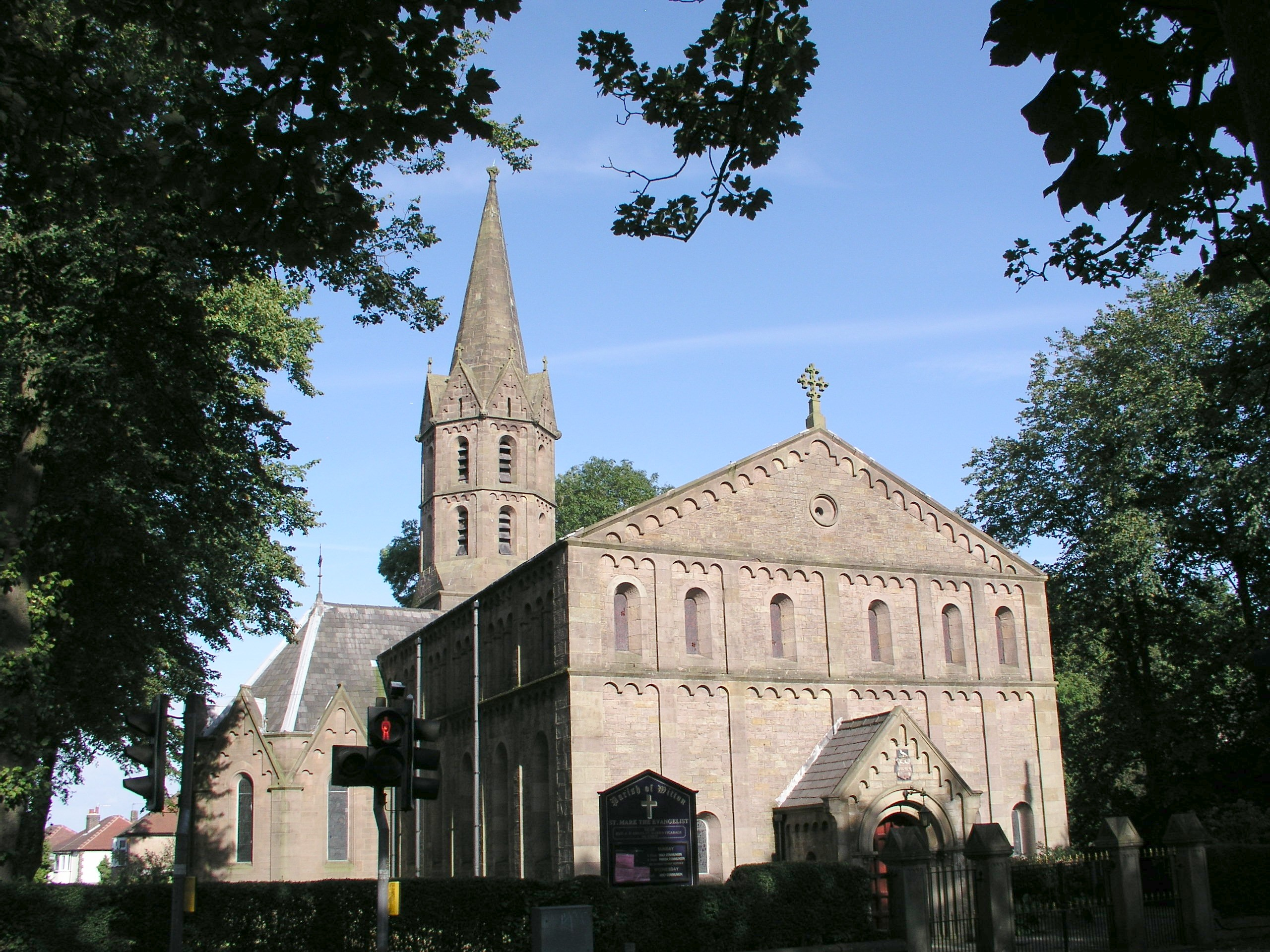
St Mark's Church, Whitton, Blackburn

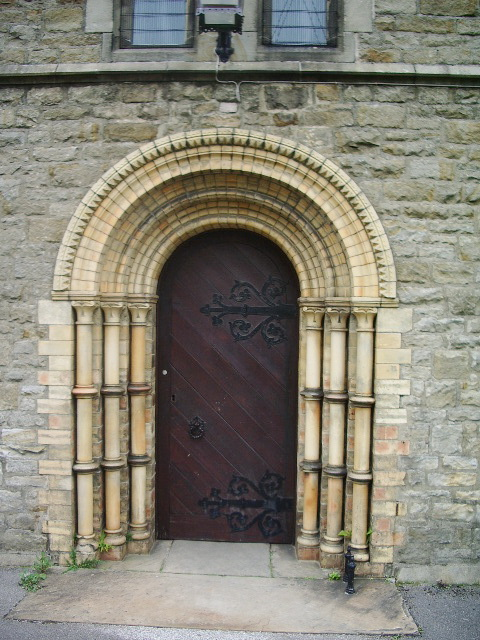
St Paul's, Scotforth, doorway, 1874–6

Four of Sharpe's earliest churches – St Saviour, Bamber Bridge (1836–37); St Mark, Witton (1836–38); and St Paul, Farington, near Leyland (1839–40) – were in the Romanesque style, which he chose because no style can be worked so cheap as the Romanesque. They turned out to be little more than rectangular 'preaching boxes'… with no frills and little ornamentation; and many of them were later enlarged. The only subsequent churches in which Sharpe used Romanesque elements St Mary's Church, Conistone in Wharfedale (1846); and St Paul, Scotforth in south Lancaster (1874–6). Sharpe's final essay in the Romanesque Revival style St Paul's Church, Scotforth, was described by Nikolaus Pevsner as a strange building and an anachronism, almost beyond belief. Sharpe had retired from his architectural practice in 1851. He then pursued a career in railway engineering. In 1874, when he was aged 68, he returned to architecture and designed this church which was opened in 1876. The church had used terracotta in a similar fashion to his earliest churches and it can only be assumed that its anachronistic appearance was that he had used a design that he had prepared at least 20 years earlier.

=== Romanesque by Sharpe ===
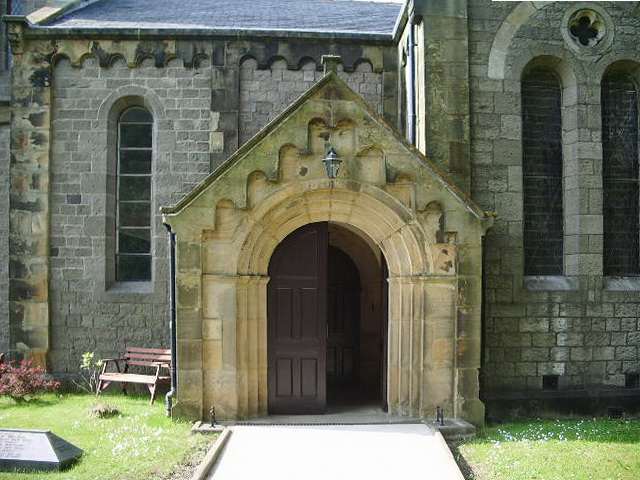
Porch, Parish of Christ Church, Chatburn

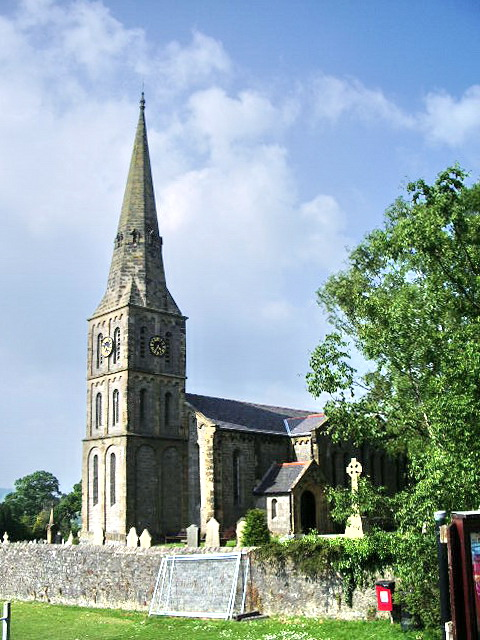
Christ Church, Chatburn

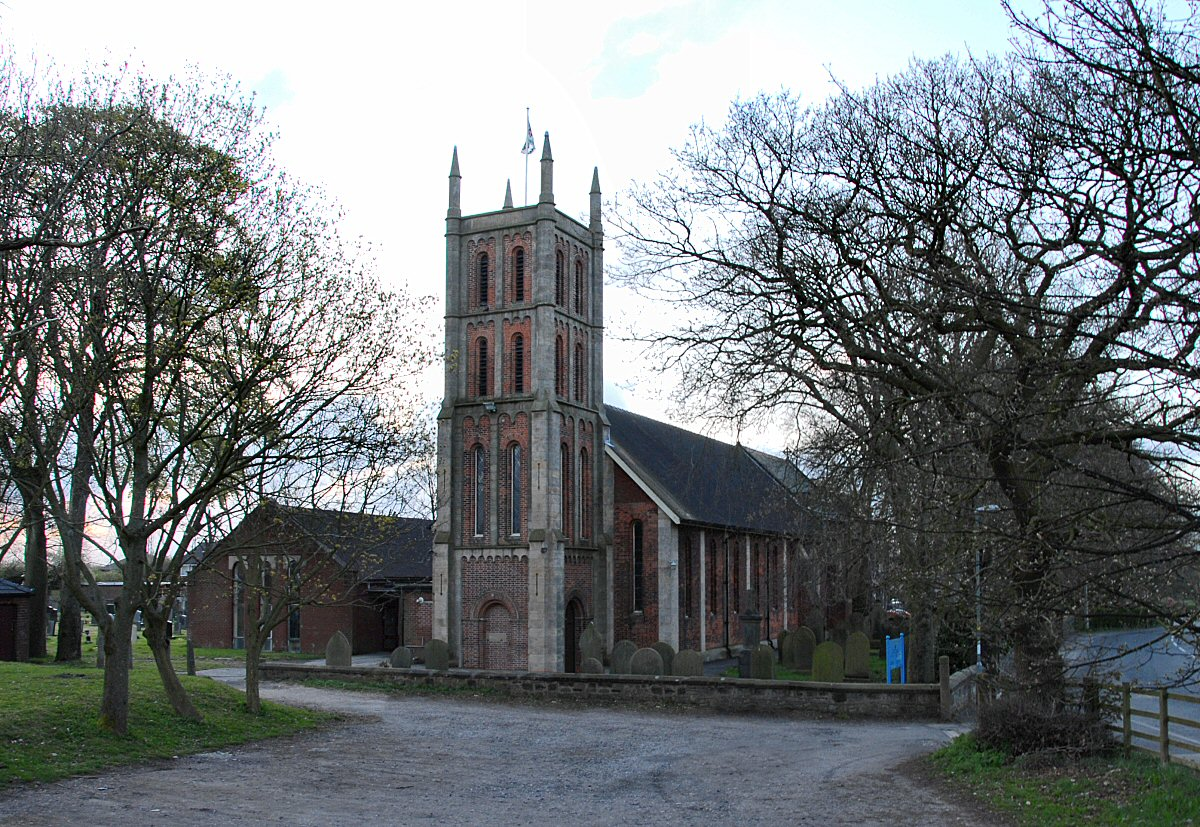
St Paul's Church, Farington Moss

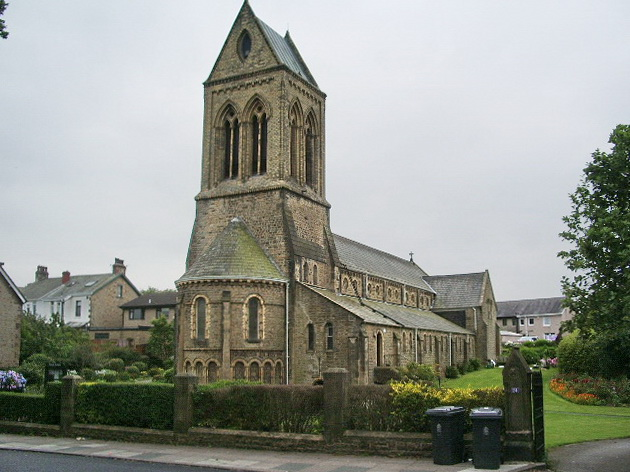
St Paul's Church, Scotforth

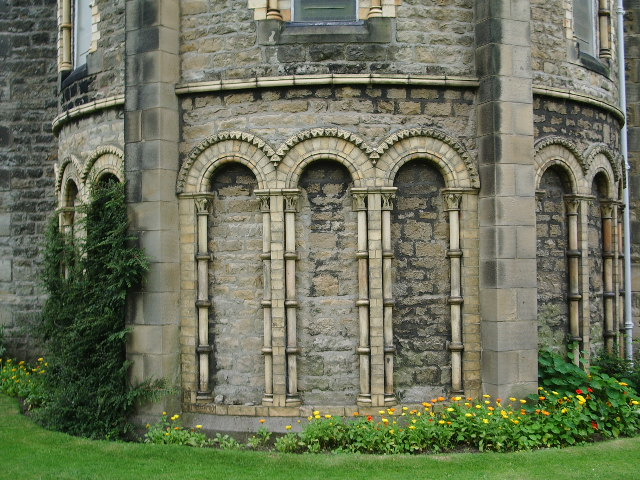
St Paul's Scotforth, arcaded apse

=== Benjamin Ferrey ===
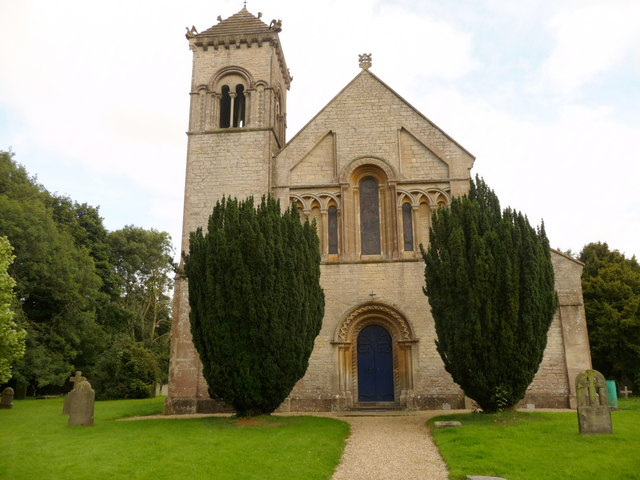
East Grafton - St Nicholas Church, 1842–44

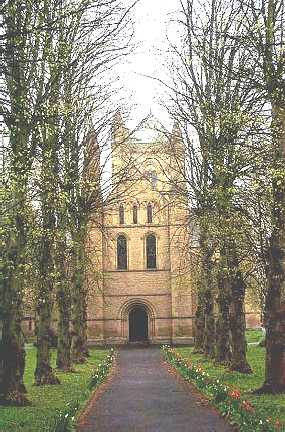
Morpeth, Northumberland, The Church of St James The Great, 1844–46

The work of Benjamin Ferrey can be considered to be similar to that of Thomas Penson, based on the English and French Romanesque traditions. An early example is his church of St Nicholas at East Grafton in Wiltshire, built in 1842–44. Here the chancel terminates in an apse and the west has overlapping arcading and chevron decoration over the entrance door. Central crossing tower and arcaded windows on the west frontis approached through a stone Romanesque Lych gate.

A more important work by Ferrey is the Church of St James the Great at Morpeth, Northumberland. The church, which is supposed to be modelled on the Cathedral of Monreale in Sicily, was built between 1844 and 1846. The unusual arched gate is acceptably Sicilian in inspiration and is similar to the portico at the cathedral at Monreale, but the rest of the composition has much more in common with French and Belgian Romanesque. A further church in this style is Christ Church in Melplash in Dorset of 1845–46. This has a heavy crossing tower and in many respects resembles the Church of St. James the Great at Morpeth.

=== Romanesque by Ferrey ===
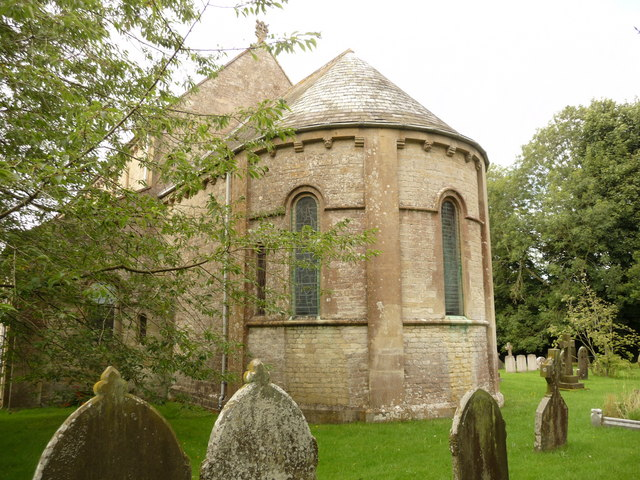
East Grafton - St Nicholas Church chancel and apse 1842–44

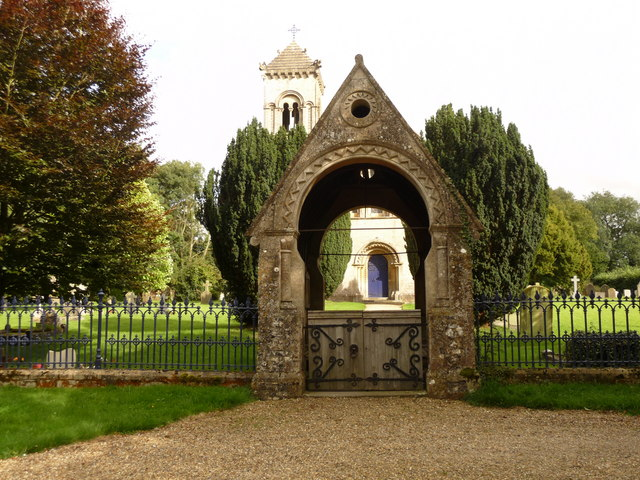
East Grafton - Lych Gate

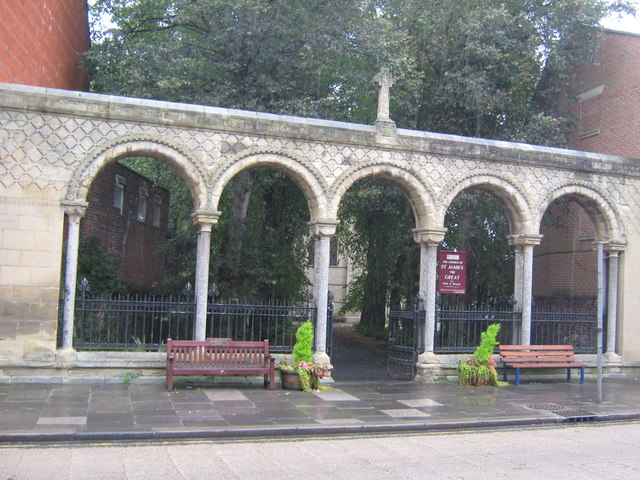
Gateway to The Church of St James the Great in Morpeth

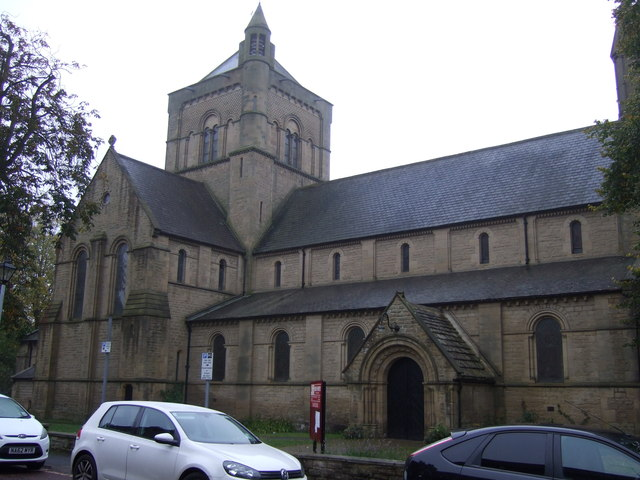
St James' Church, Morpeth

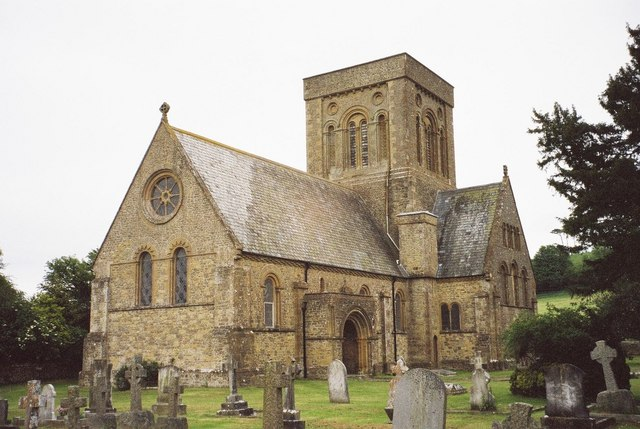
Christ Church, Melplash, Doset

=== William Perkin of Leeds ===
The genuine Norman church of St Michael and All Angels at Barton le Street, North Yorkshire was very extensively rebuilt in 1869–71 by William Perkin and his sons of Leeds. Much sculpture from the old church was reused in the new one, with the Norman corbel-tables being reversed to face into the building. The pews and some other furnishings are in Romanesque revival style. The rebuilding was financed by Hugo Francis Meynell-Ingram.

=== Barton le Street Gallery ===
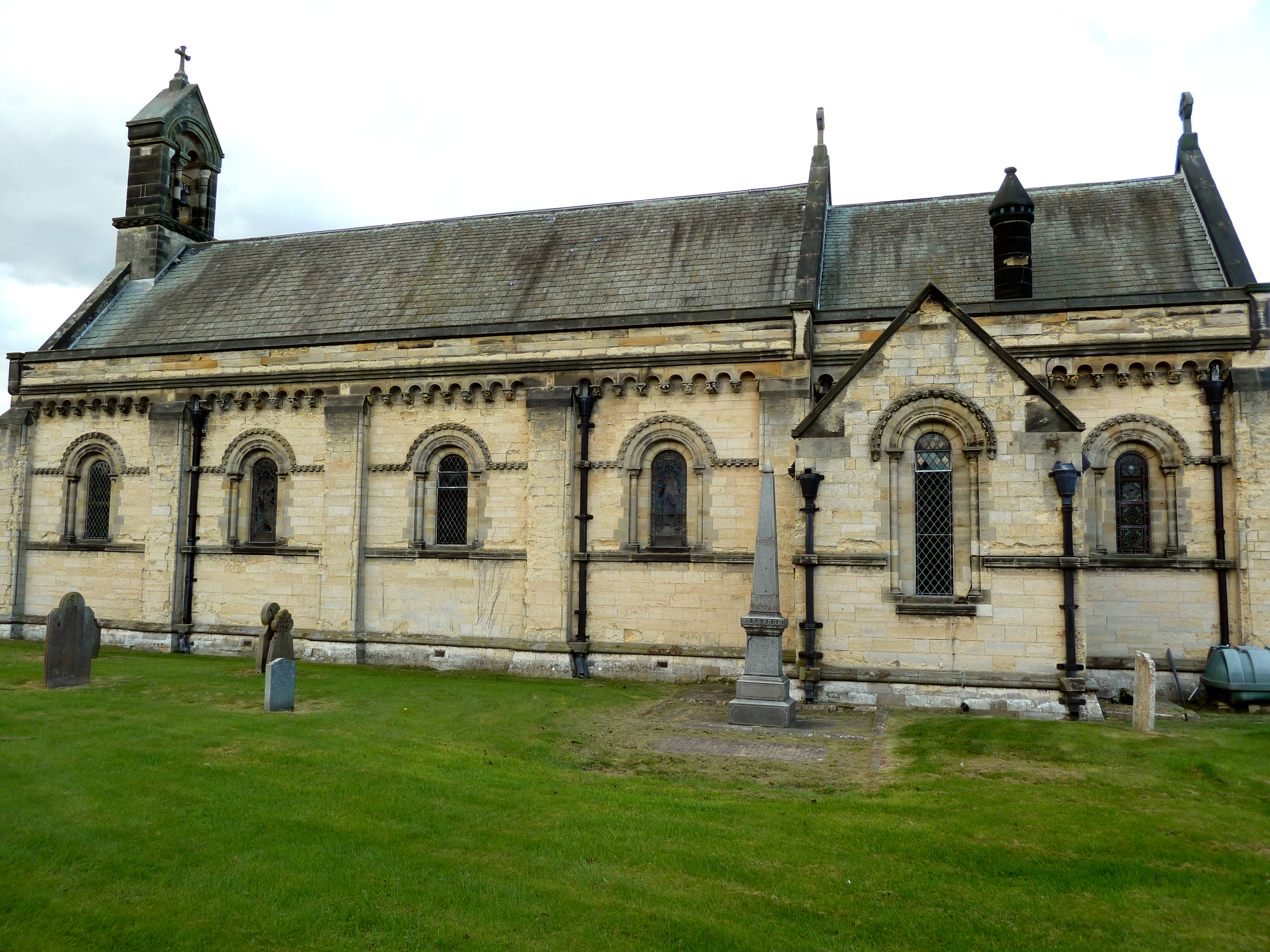
Barton-le-Street Church

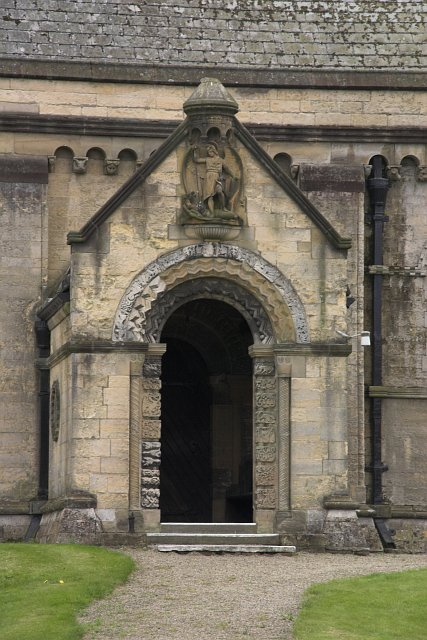
Main door of Michael and all Angels

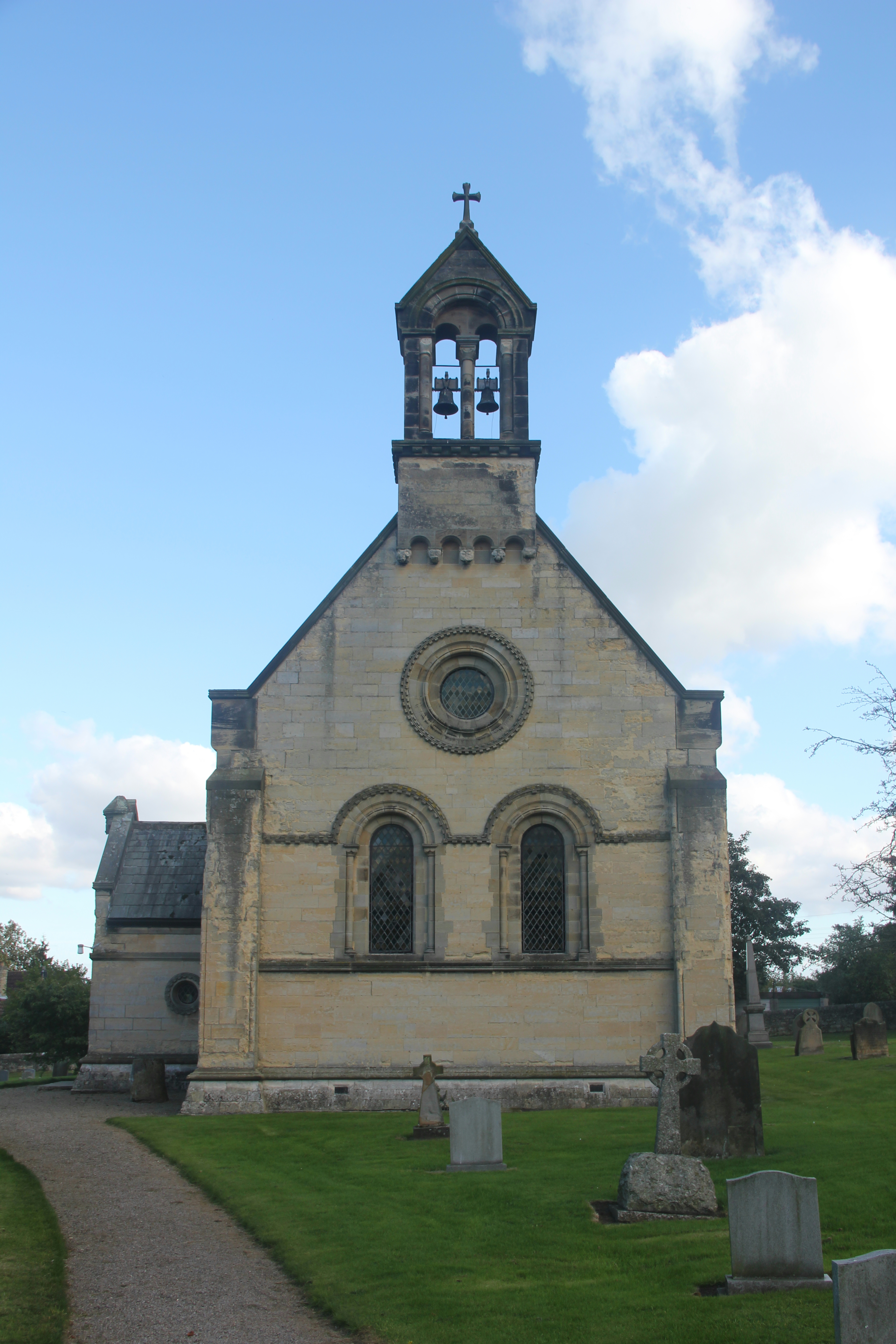
St Michael Barton-le-Street

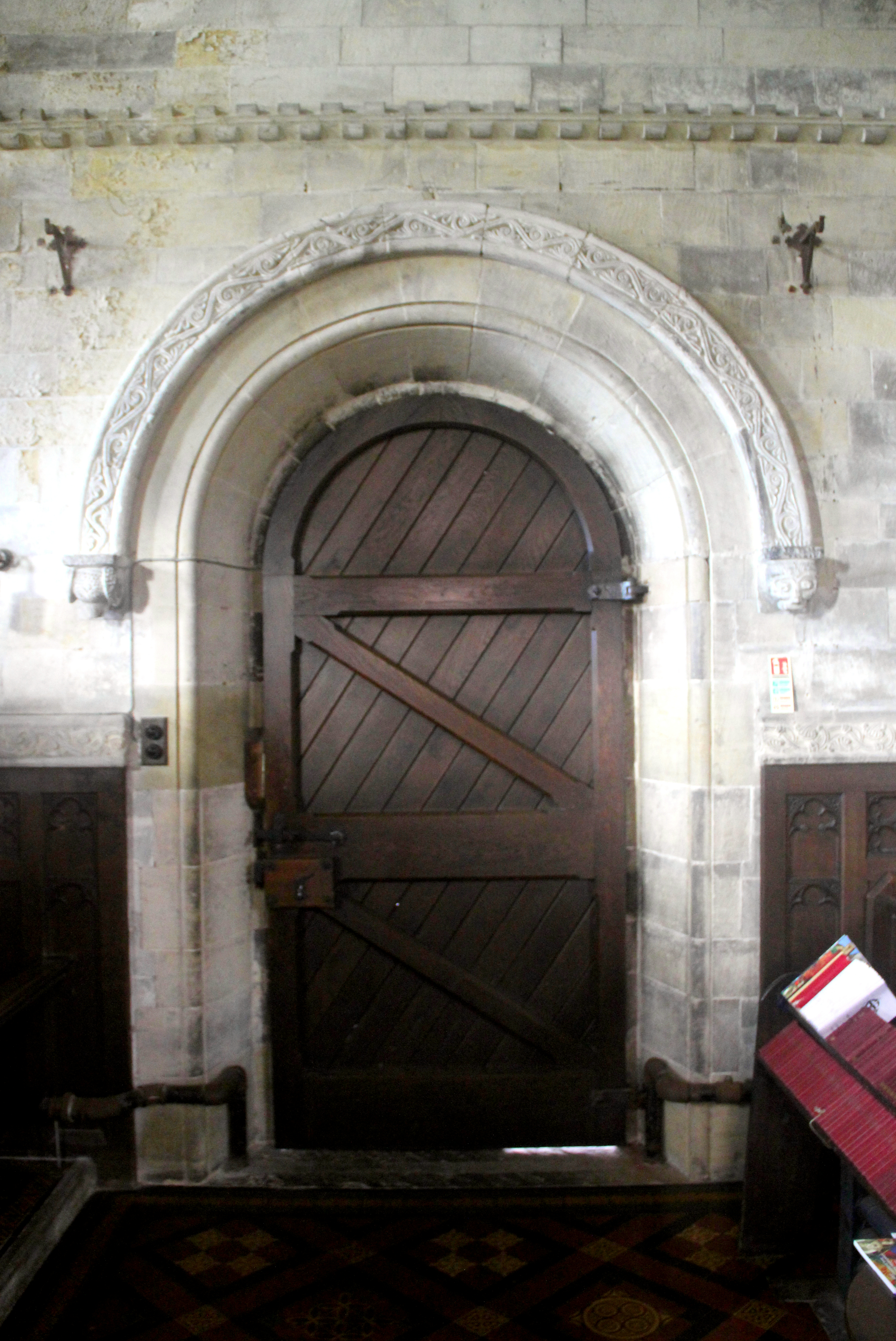
St Michael Barton-le-Street

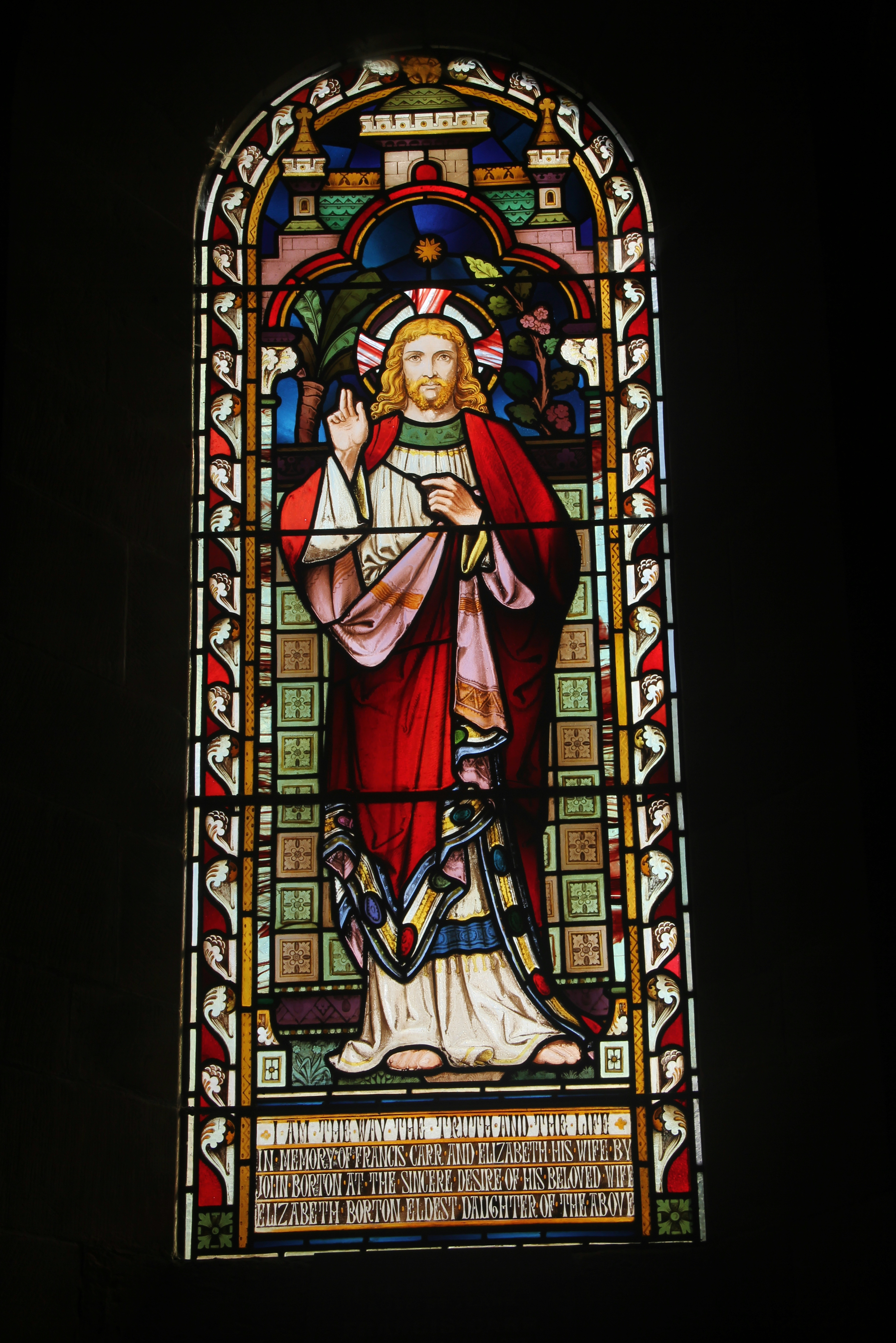
St Michael Barton-le-Street

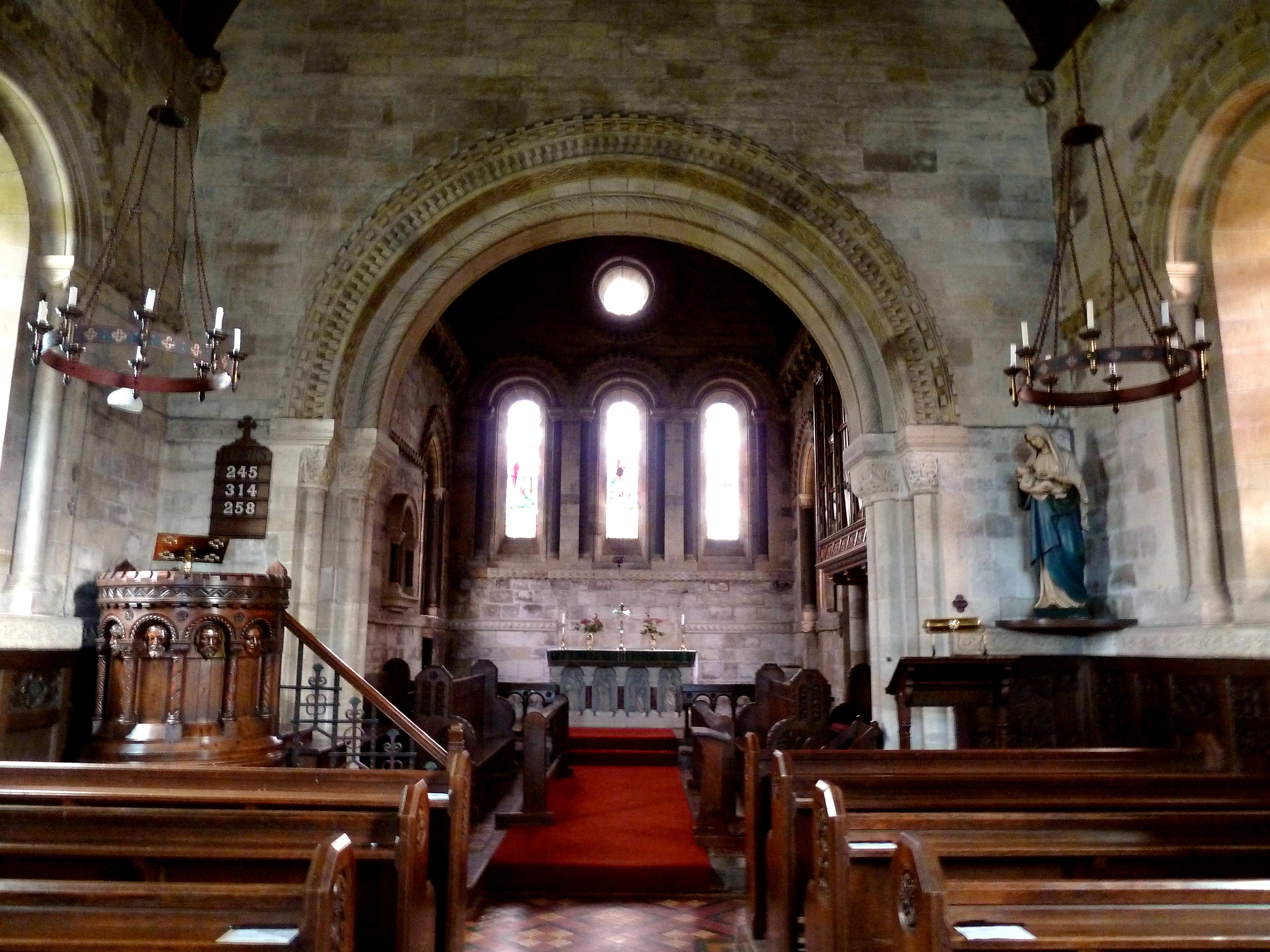
Barton-le-Street Church

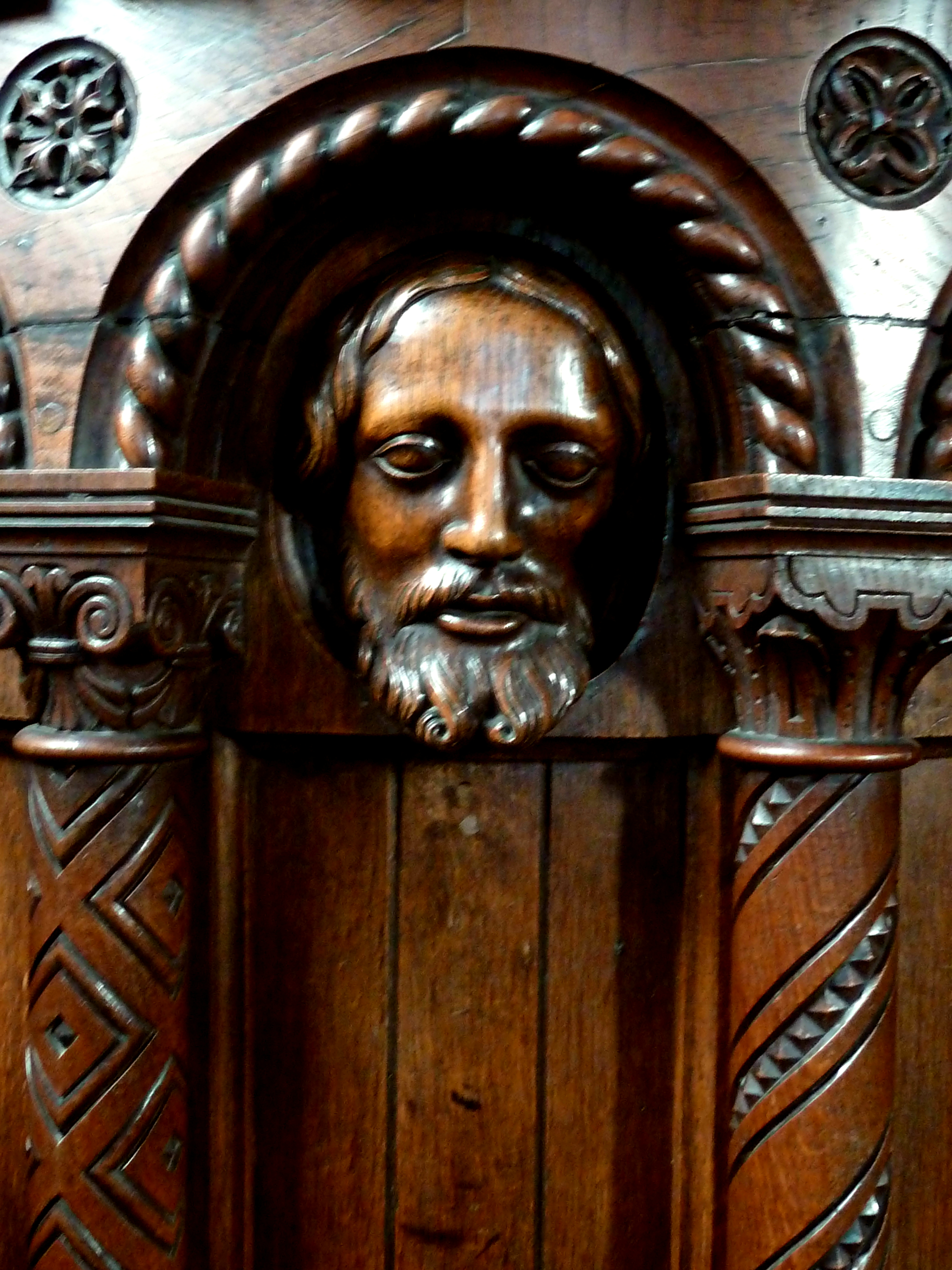
Barton-le-Street Church

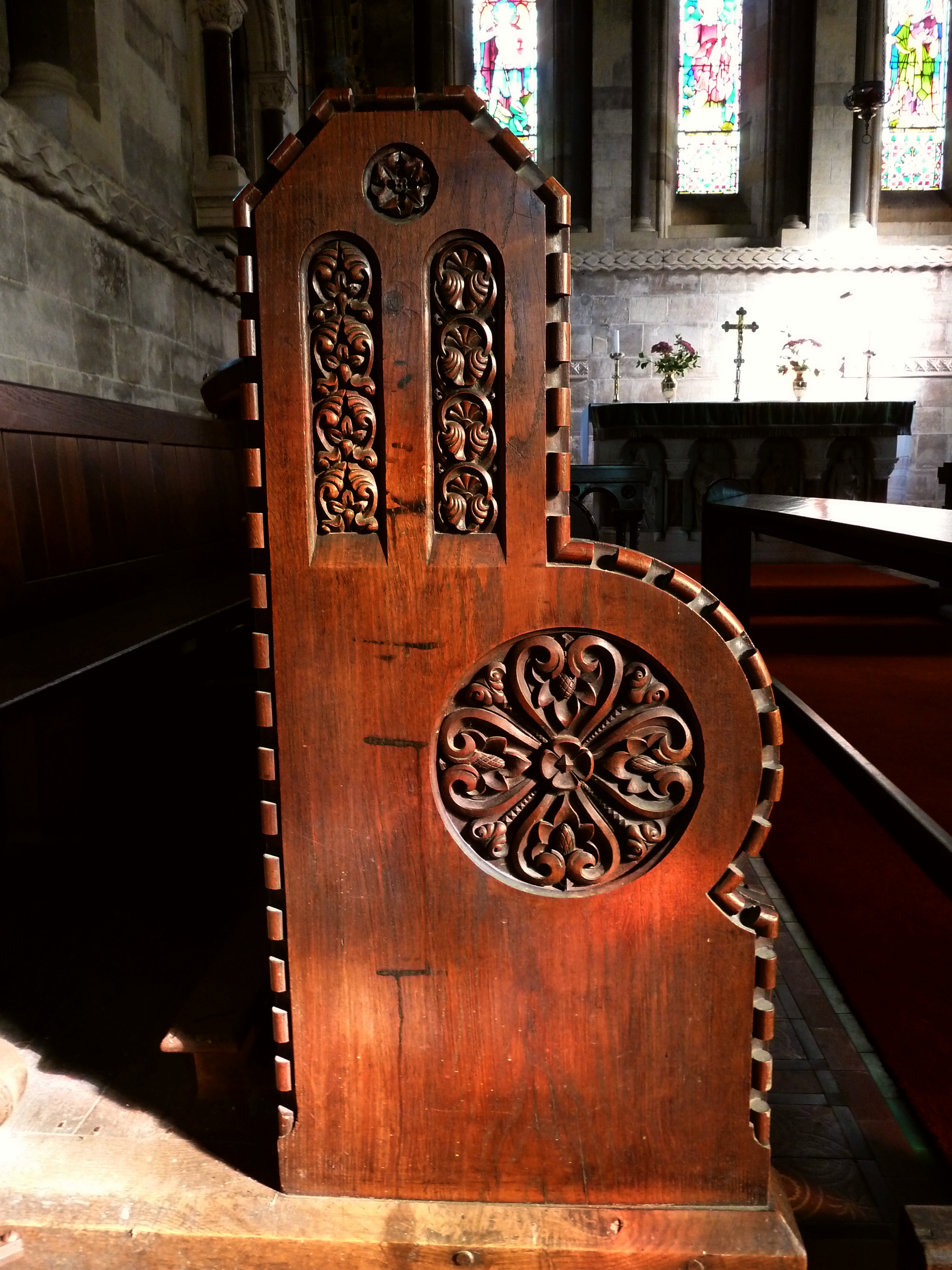
Barton-le-Street Church

== Romanesque gallery ==
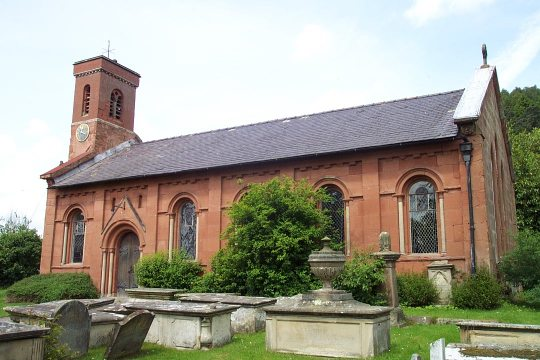
All Saints, Grinshill 1839–40 by John Carline of Shrewsbury

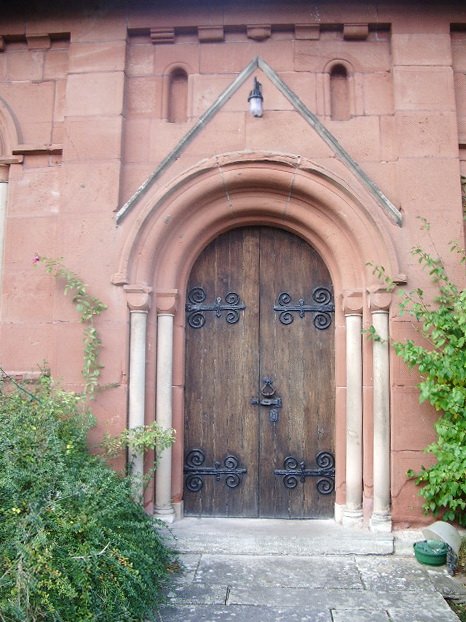
All Saints Church, Grinshill, Doorway 1839–40 by John Carline of Shrewsbury

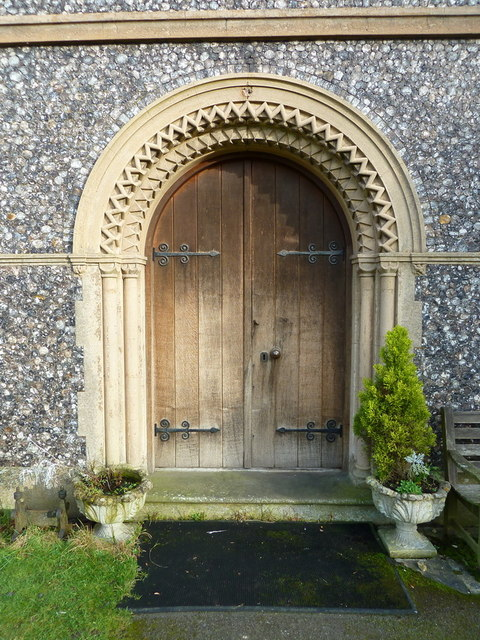
St Thomas of Canterbury, West Hyde, Doorway 1844

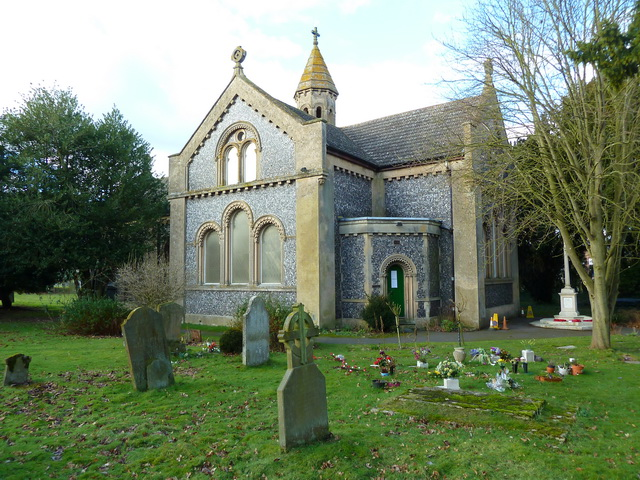
St Thomas of Canterbury, West Hyde, by Thomas Smith, 1844

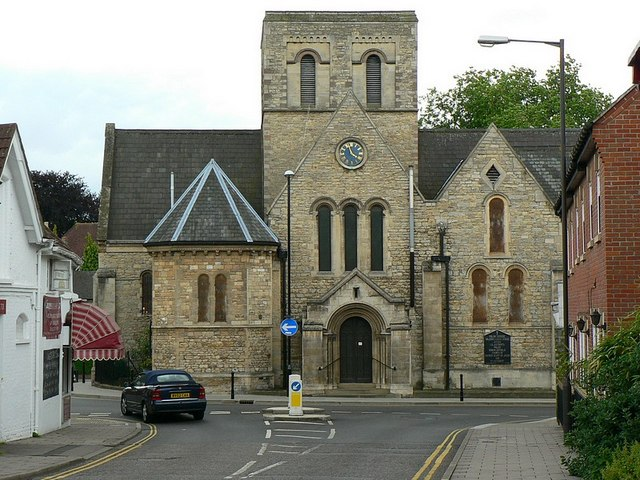
St Cuthbert's Polish Church, Bedford. Rebuilt 1845–47 by James Woodroffe of Bedford.

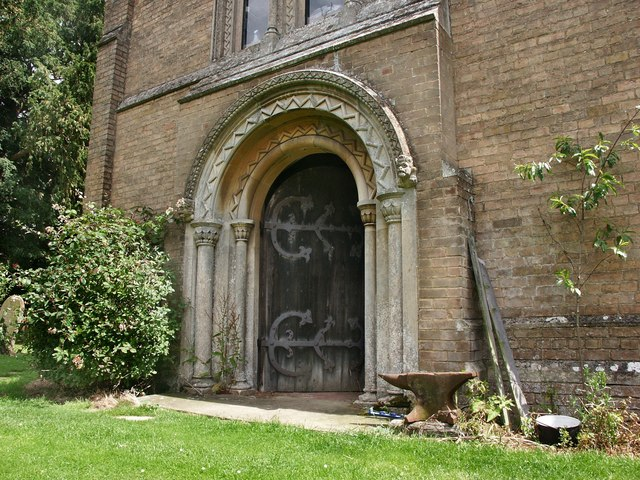
St Andrew, Claxby St Andrew by G R Willoughby 1846

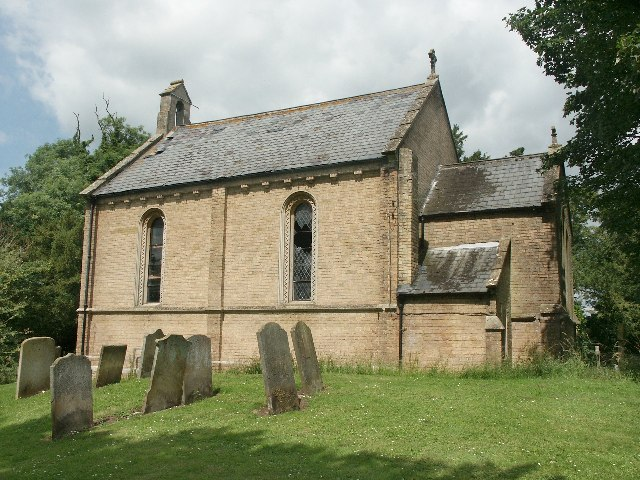
St Andrew's Church, Claxby (by Alford) 1846

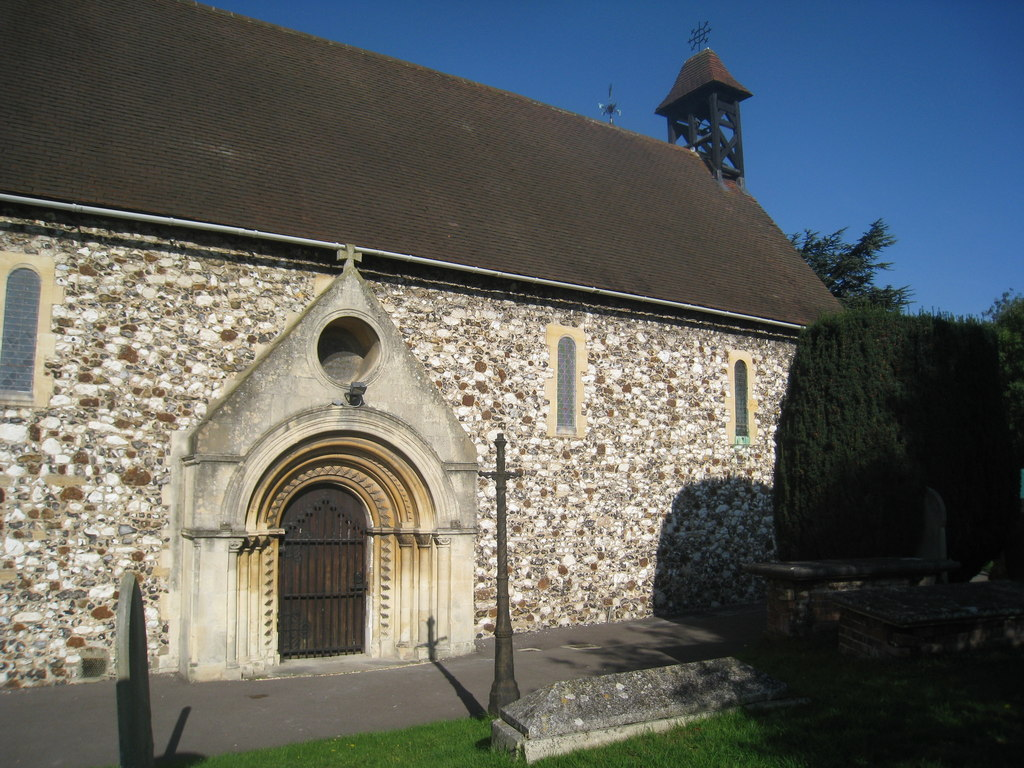
St Laurence, Upton, Slough, 1850–51 by Benjamin Ferrey

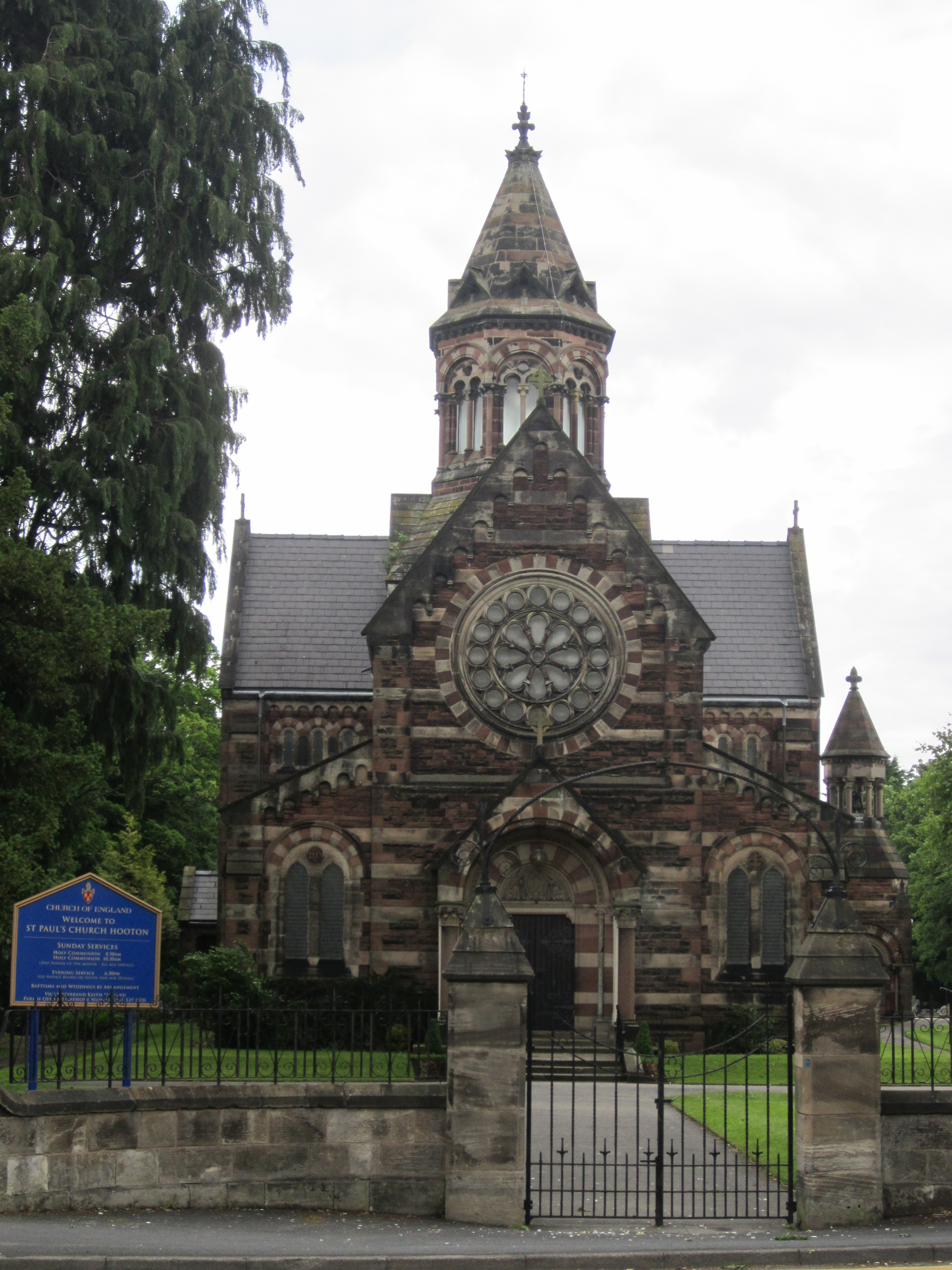
St Paul's Church, Hooton, Cheshire

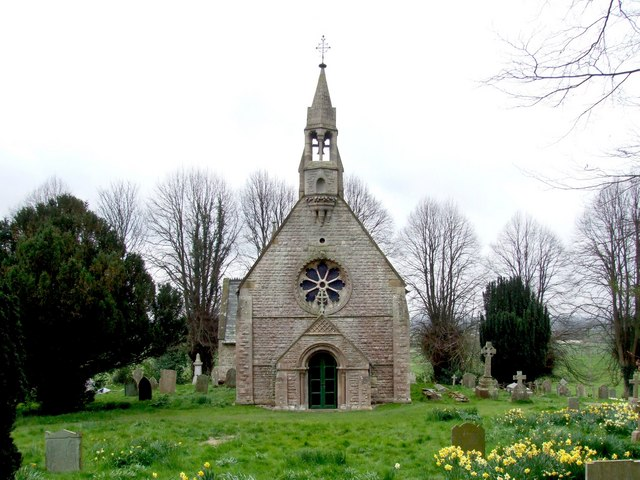
St James, Rigsby, near Alford by Fowler, 1863

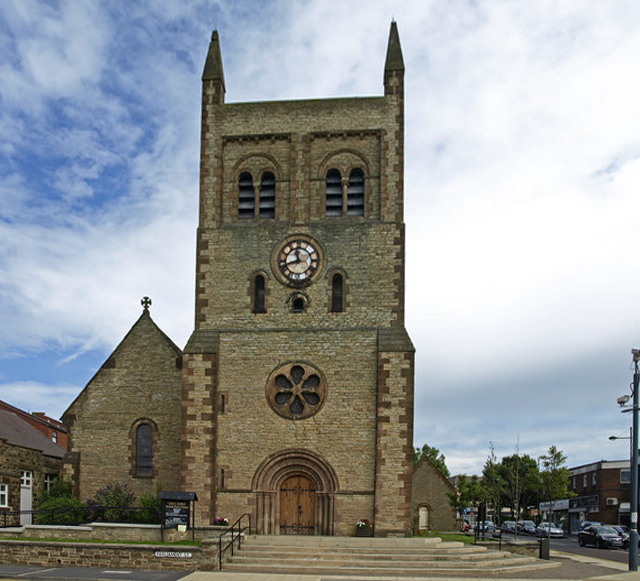
Christ Church, Consett, Durham, 1866, by J A Cory

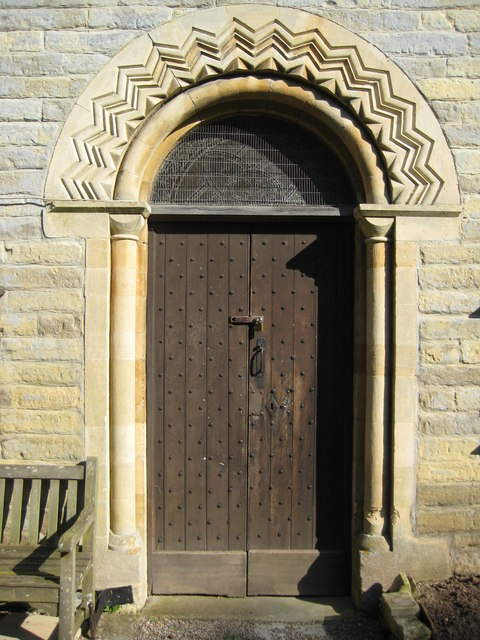
West door, Earl's Croome Church

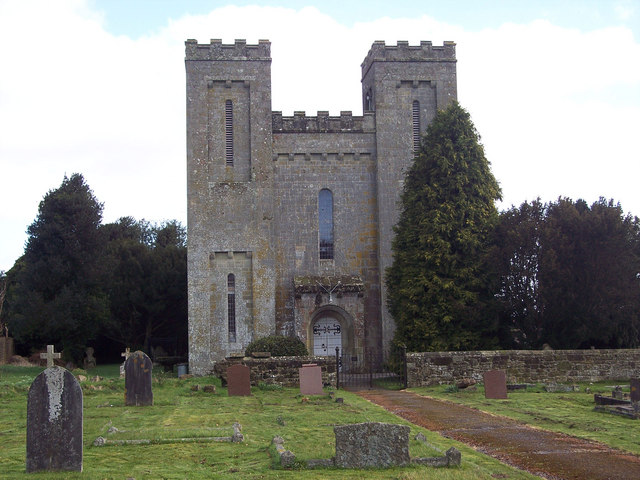
St John's Church, Charlton 1872

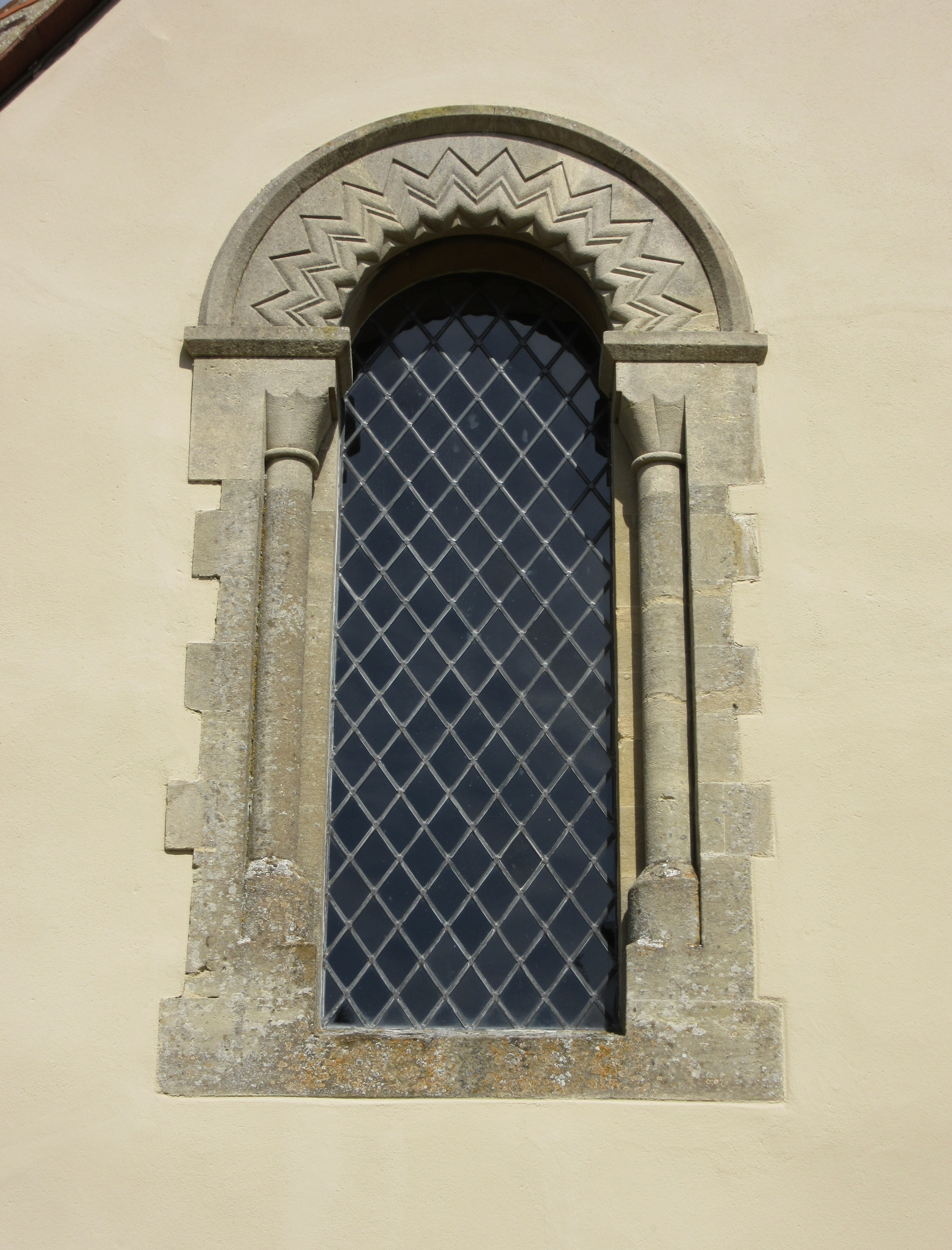
Wisley Church, Wisley Lane, Wisley. 1872

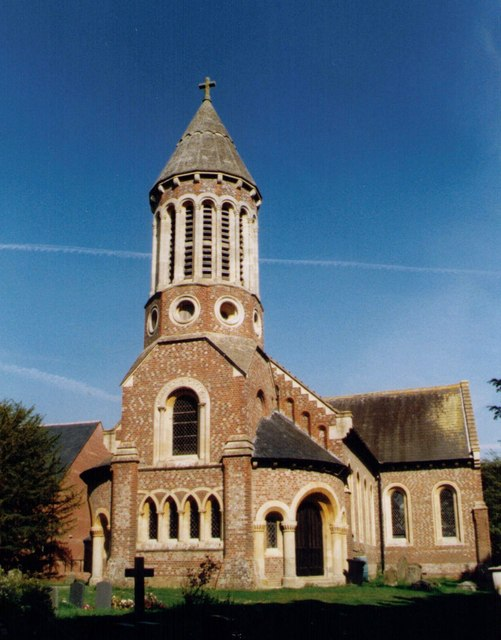
St Marys Church Burghfield

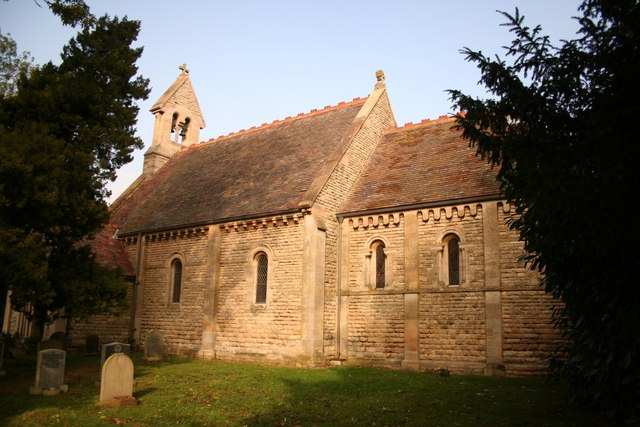
St.Lucia's church, Dembleby, Lincolnshire

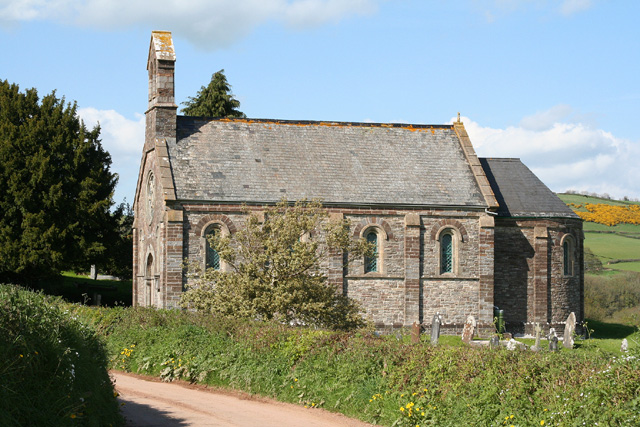
Bampton, church at Petton

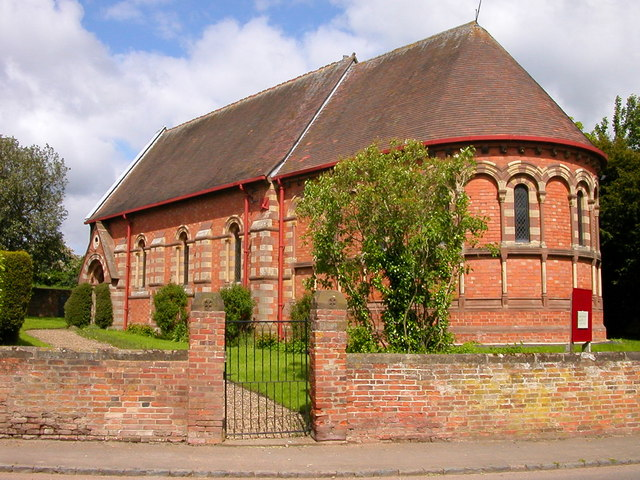
St Denys, Pailton, Warwickshire, 1882

=== French religious exile and continental influences ===
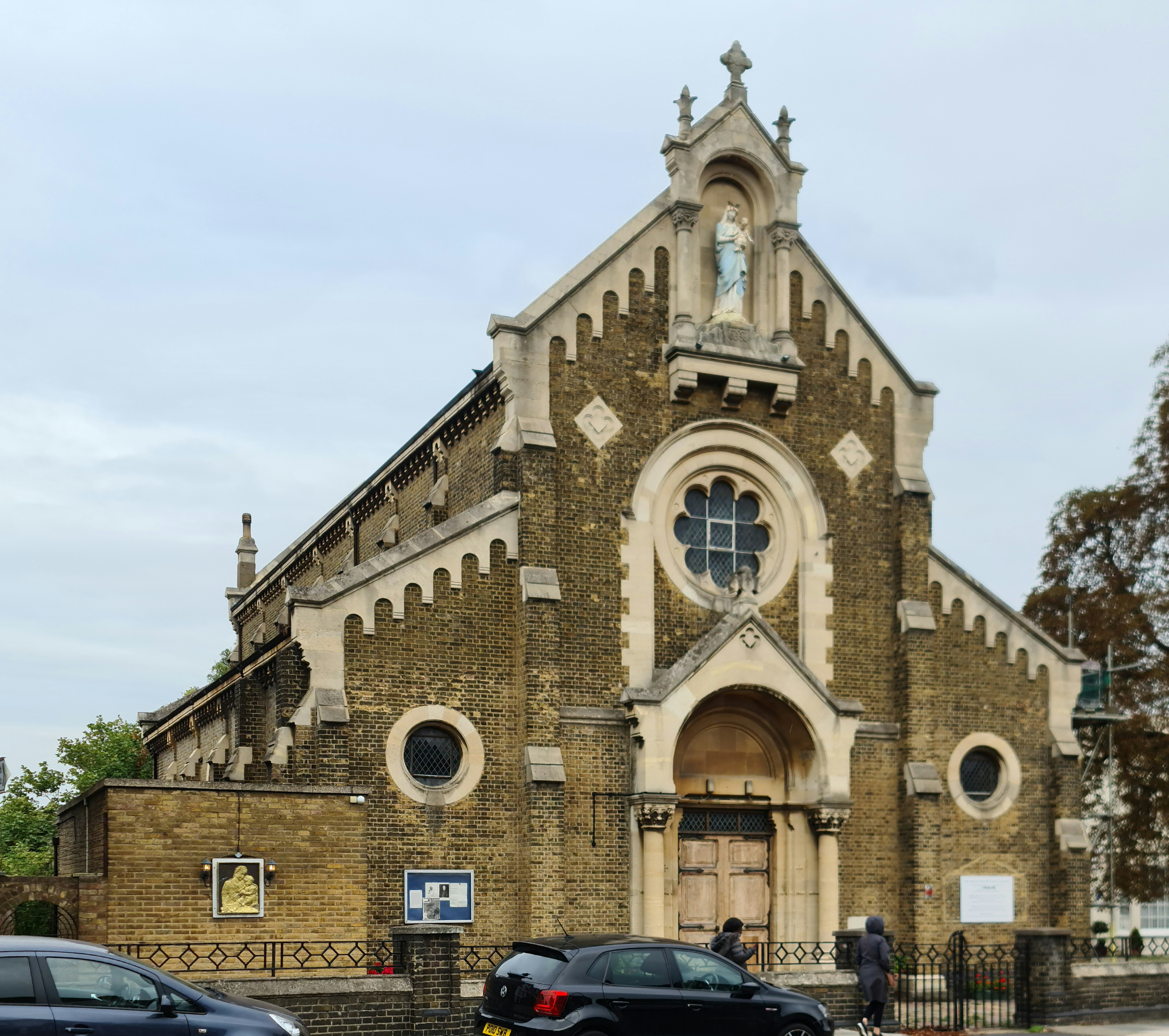
Our Lady of Grace Church, Charlton, by Eugène-Jacques Gervais, 1905-1906

The French religious exile of 1901-1914, triggered by anti-clerical legislation, brought Continental Romanesque Revival traditions directly to Britain through displaced religious communities. Approximately 30,000 French religious were forced into exile, with Britain receiving significant numbers who established new foundations reflecting their architectural heritage.

The most architecturally significant example is Our Lady of Grace Church, Charlton, built 1905-1906 by French architect Eugène-Jacques Gervais (1852–1940) for the exiled Sisters of the Assumption. The church represents a rare example of Neo-Romanesque design in British Catholic architecture, where Gothic Revival was overwhelmingly preferred. Built of stock brick with stone dressings, it features a five-bay nave with barrel vault, Corinthian columns with scagliola shafts, and a dramatic apse originally containing a theatrically lit statue of the Virgin and Child on clouds.

The church forms part of an integrated heritage complex with the Grade II listed Highcombe House (c.1824-1825), previously home to inventor Sir William Congreve, 2nd Baronet and railway engineer William Henry Barlow. Gervais's design synthesised French Neo-Romanesque traditions with British construction methods, creating architecture that preserved Continental Catholic aesthetic principles while adapting to local contexts.

This building represents material evidence of one of the most significant episodes of religious persecution in modern European history, demonstrating how forced migration paradoxically strengthened global Catholic architectural heritage through the transplantation of regional traditions.

=== Chapel architecture ===
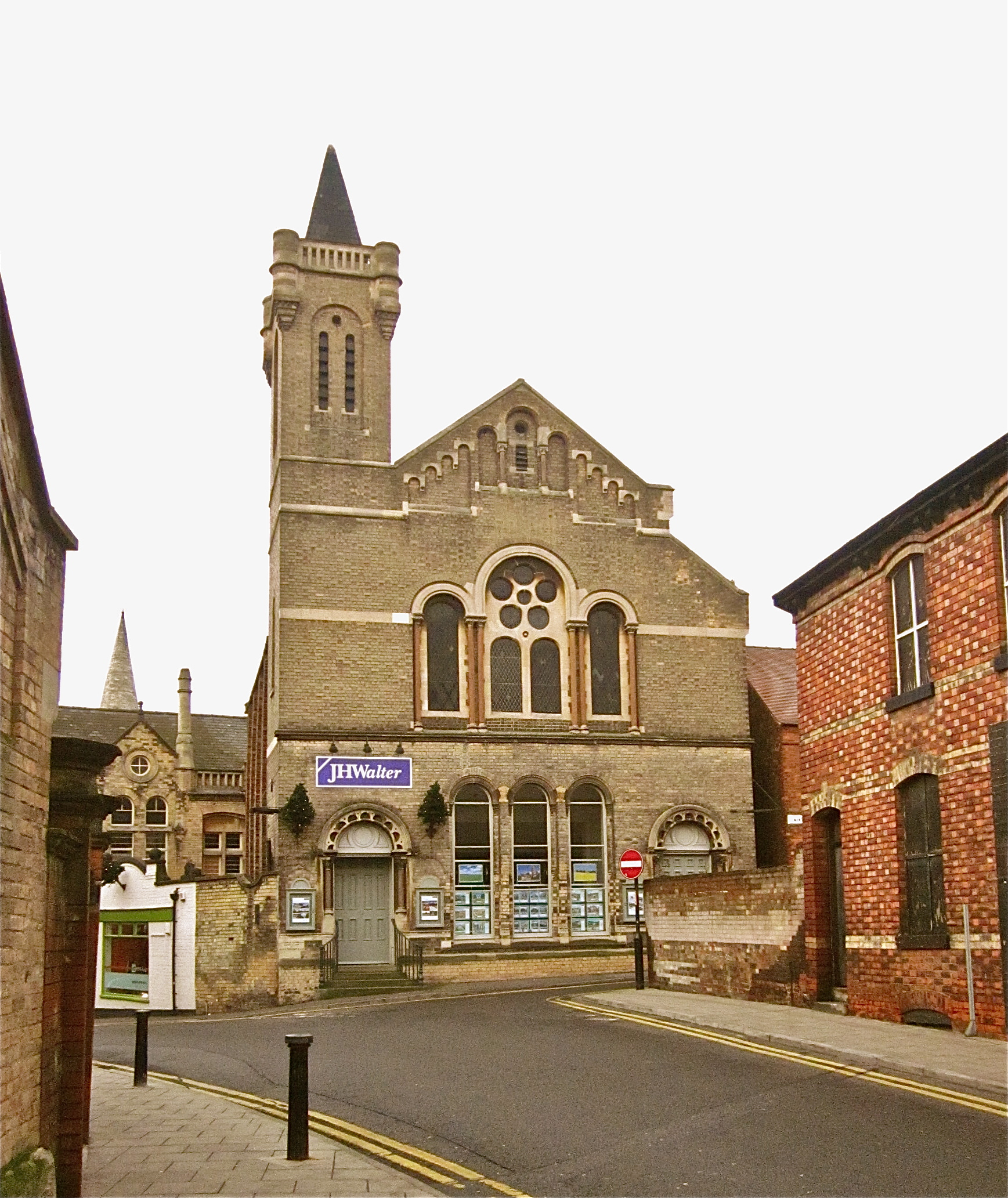
Baptist Church, Mint Street, Lincoln

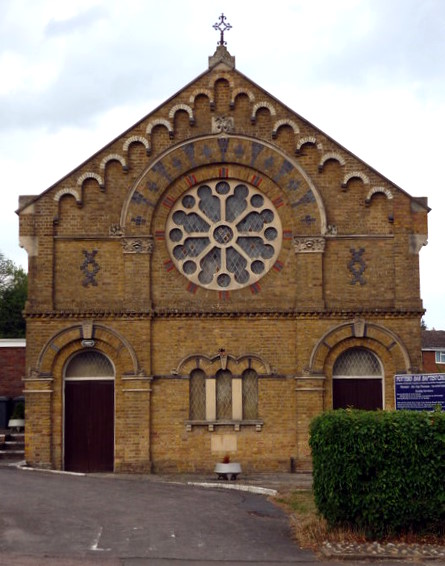
Potters Bar Old Baptist Church

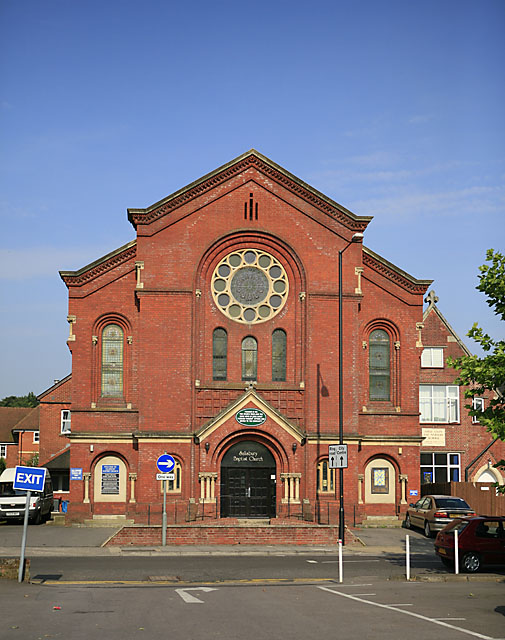
Baptist Church, Brown Street, Salisbury

In the 1860s, Romanesque architecture became a popular style of architecture for Dissenting chapels. Possibly this was intended to give the impression that they were churches similar to Anglican churches and they are often referred to as churches rather than chapels. This form of architecture was often chosen by the Baptists. This architecture is an adapted and debased form of Italianate Romanesque as seen at the Potter's Bar Old Baptist Church in Hertfordshire in 1859. The Baptist Church in Brown Street Salisbury of the 1880s is similar in bright red brick and was built in the 1880s. It is noticeably more archaeologically correct in its use of arched windows and the entrance door. A Baptist Chapel of 1870 by the Lincoln architects Drury and Mortimer, the Mint Lane Baptist Chapel in Lincoln is in a debased Italianate Romanesque revival style but has a surprising tower in the castellated Gothic style.

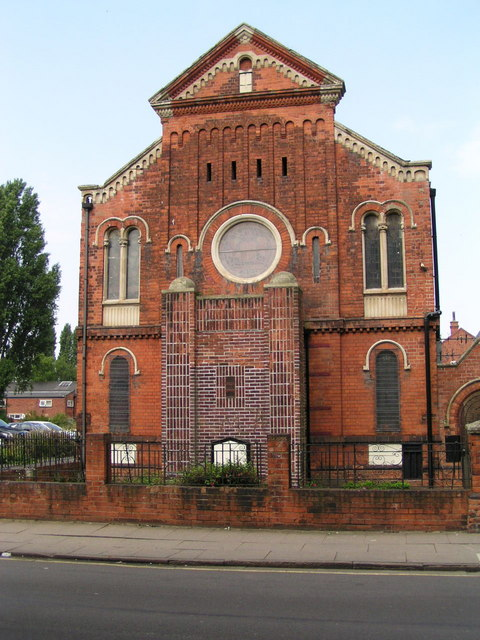
Grimsby Synagogue

=== Synagogues ===
The Romanesque revival was also a style of architecture that appealed to Jewish communities and there are examples of Synagogues in this style. One of these is the synagogue built adjacent to the docks at Grimsby in Lincolnshire.

=== Later Romanesque Revival churches in Scotland ===
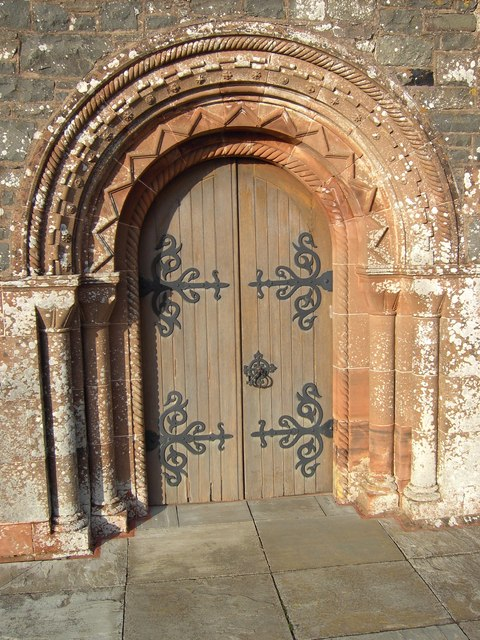
Cranshaws Kirk door

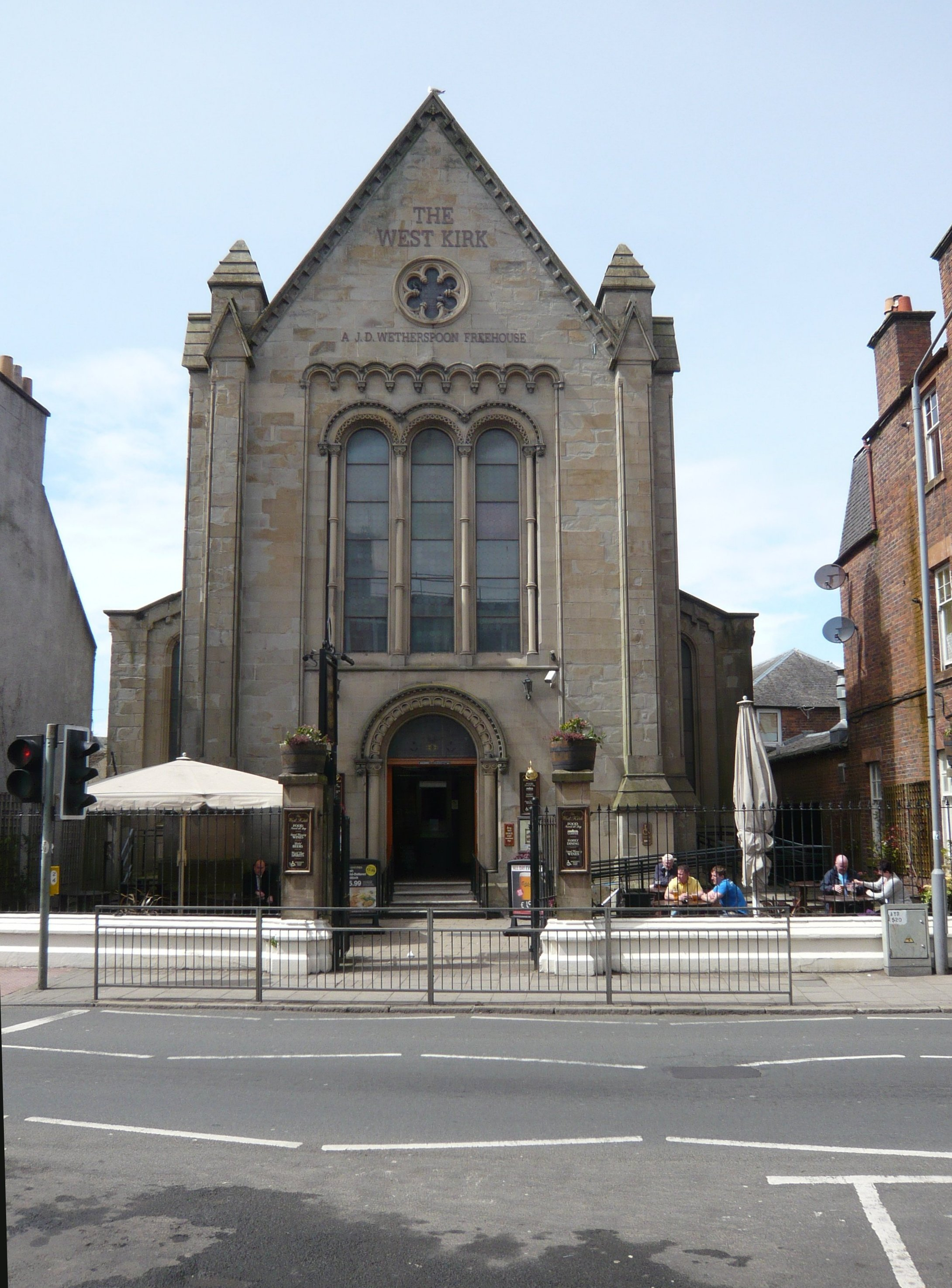
West Kirk, Sandgate, Ayr, by William Gale 1844–45

The earliest example of Romanesque revival architecture in Scotland is the West Kirk, Sandgate, Ayr. By the architect William Gale for the Presbyterian Free Church and built in 1844–45. The columns used for the windows are very similar to those used by Edmund Sharpe at Scotford church. In Scotland the Presbyterians occasionally built in the Romanesque revival style, but only later in the 19th century. St Conan’s Kirk Lochawe, Agyll and Bute is an extraordinary early 20th century church on the shore of Loch Awe, built by Walter Douglas Campbell, brother of the 1st Lord Blythswood, was started in 1881, but not completed until 1930. The kirk is largely Romanesque in style, but is also mixed with other completely unrelated styles. Another church is Cranshaws in Berwickshire. Here the 1739 church was rebuilt in 1899 by architect George Fortune in Romanesque Revival style.

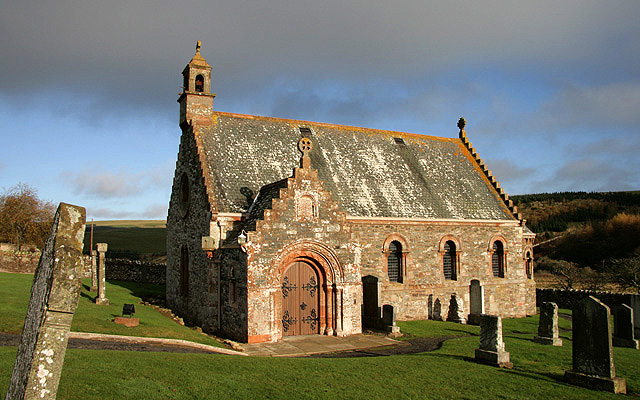
Cranshaws Parish Church

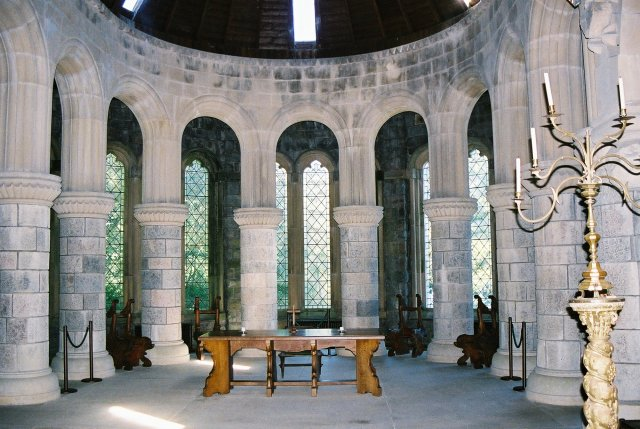
St Conan's Kirk Lochawe

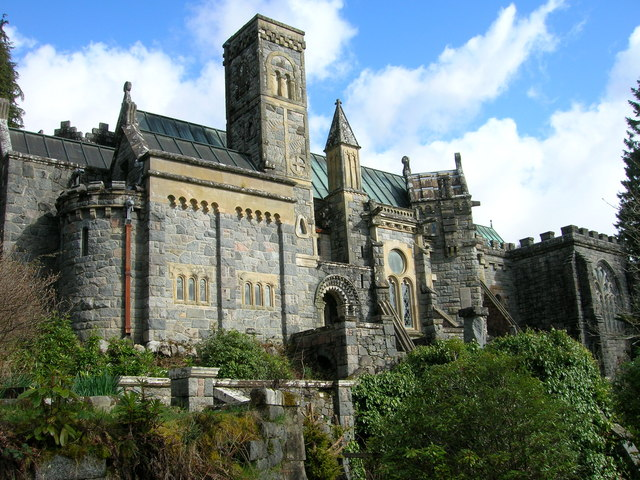
St Conan's Church, Lochawe

== Sir Alfred Waterhouse and developed Romanesque Architecture ==
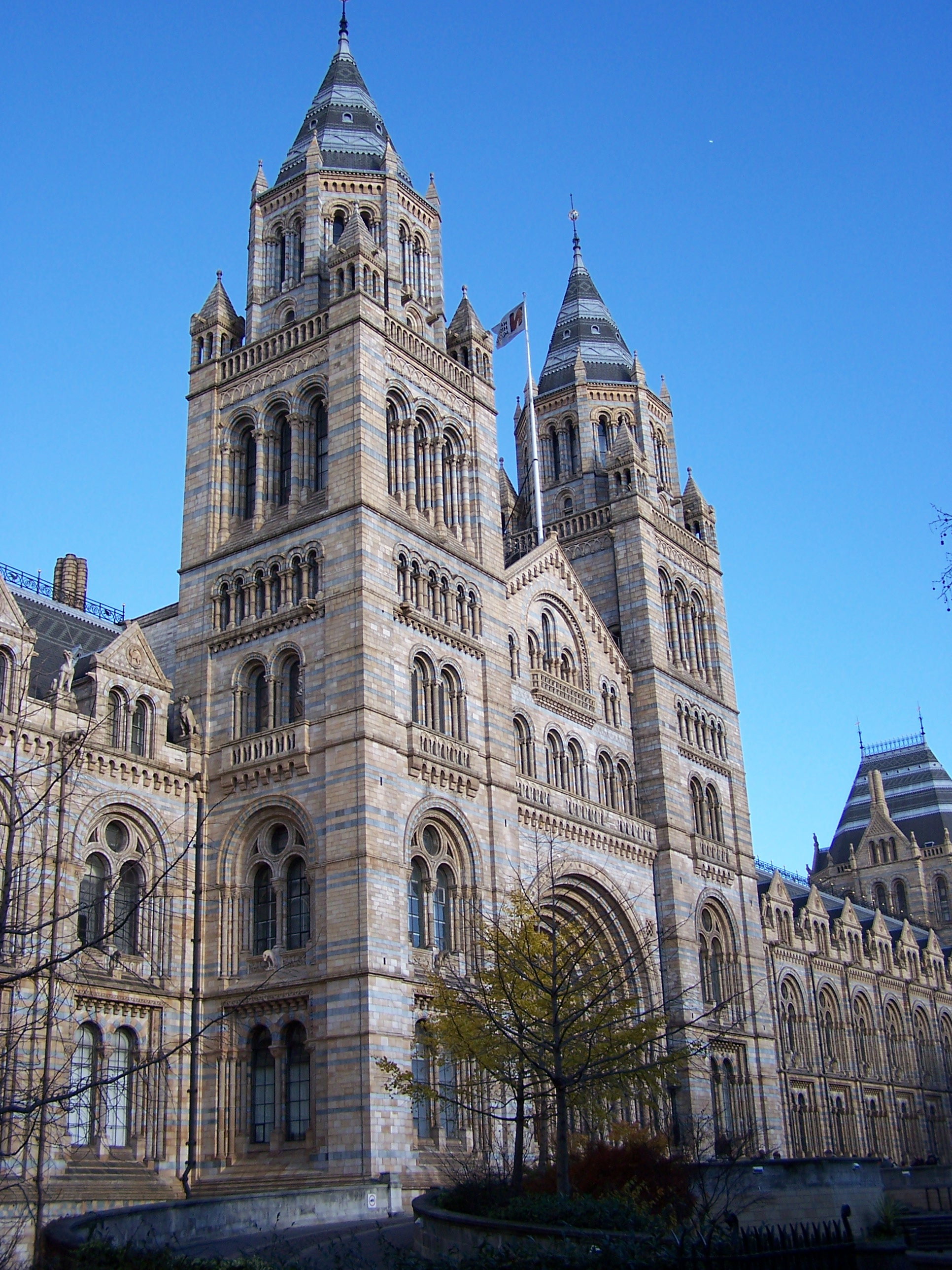
Natural History Museum

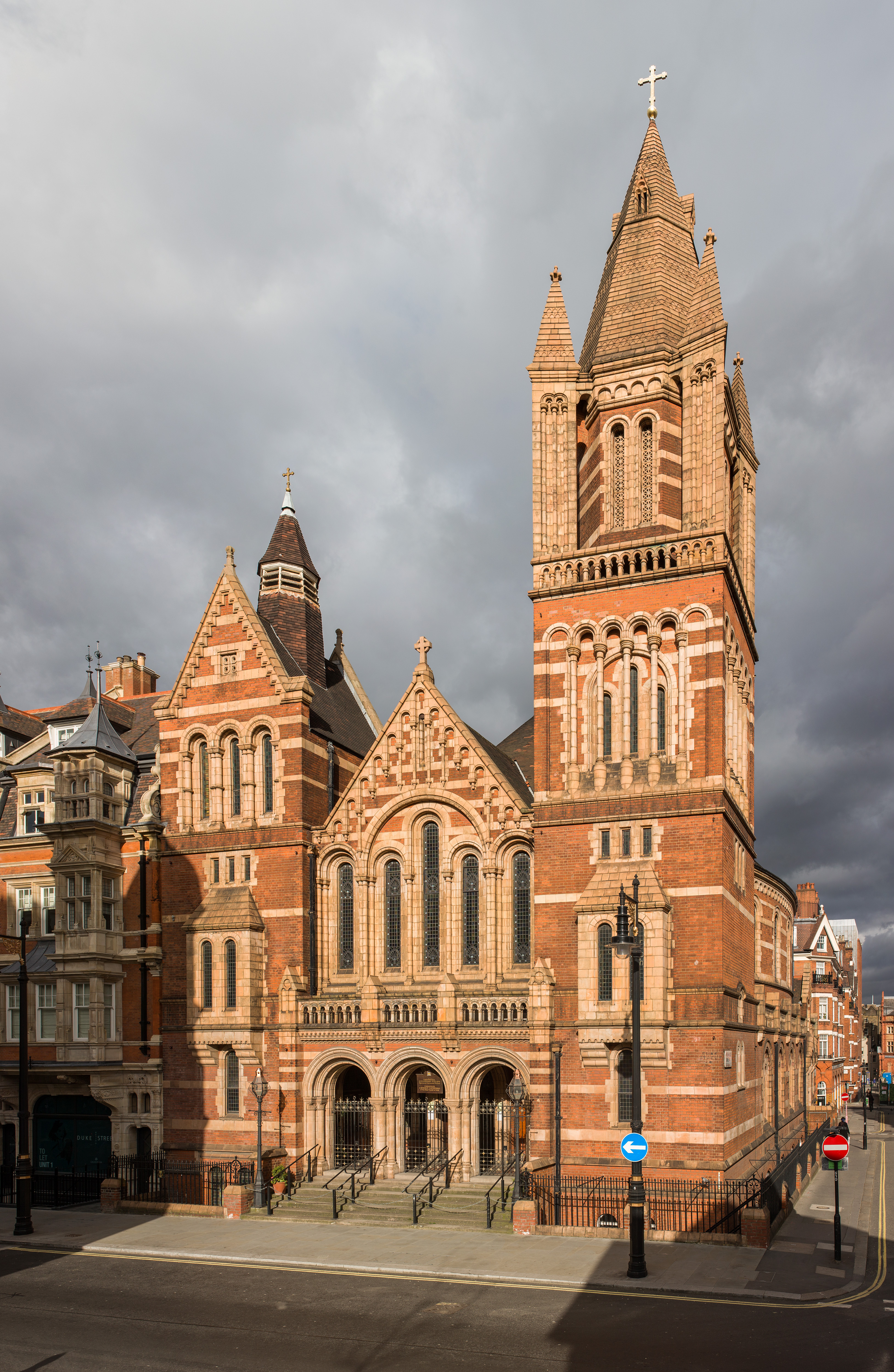
Ukrainian Catholic Cathedral of the Holy Family in Exile, London

Interest in Romanesque Revival Architecture was renewed by Sir Alfred Waterhouse's Natural History Museum in Kensington, which was built between 1873 and 1881. It was built in shades of buff coloured terracotta and opened the way for the Romanesque style to be used for other buildings, apart from churches. Waterhouse tended to mix the architectural styles, often using decorative Romanesque arches to provide impressive entrances for his buildings, and popularised the deep red terracotta produced by manufacturer's in the Wrexham and Ruabon area of North-East Wales. This included parts of the Prudential Insurance building in London and the entrance to Strangeways Prison.

=== Buildings by Waterhouse ===
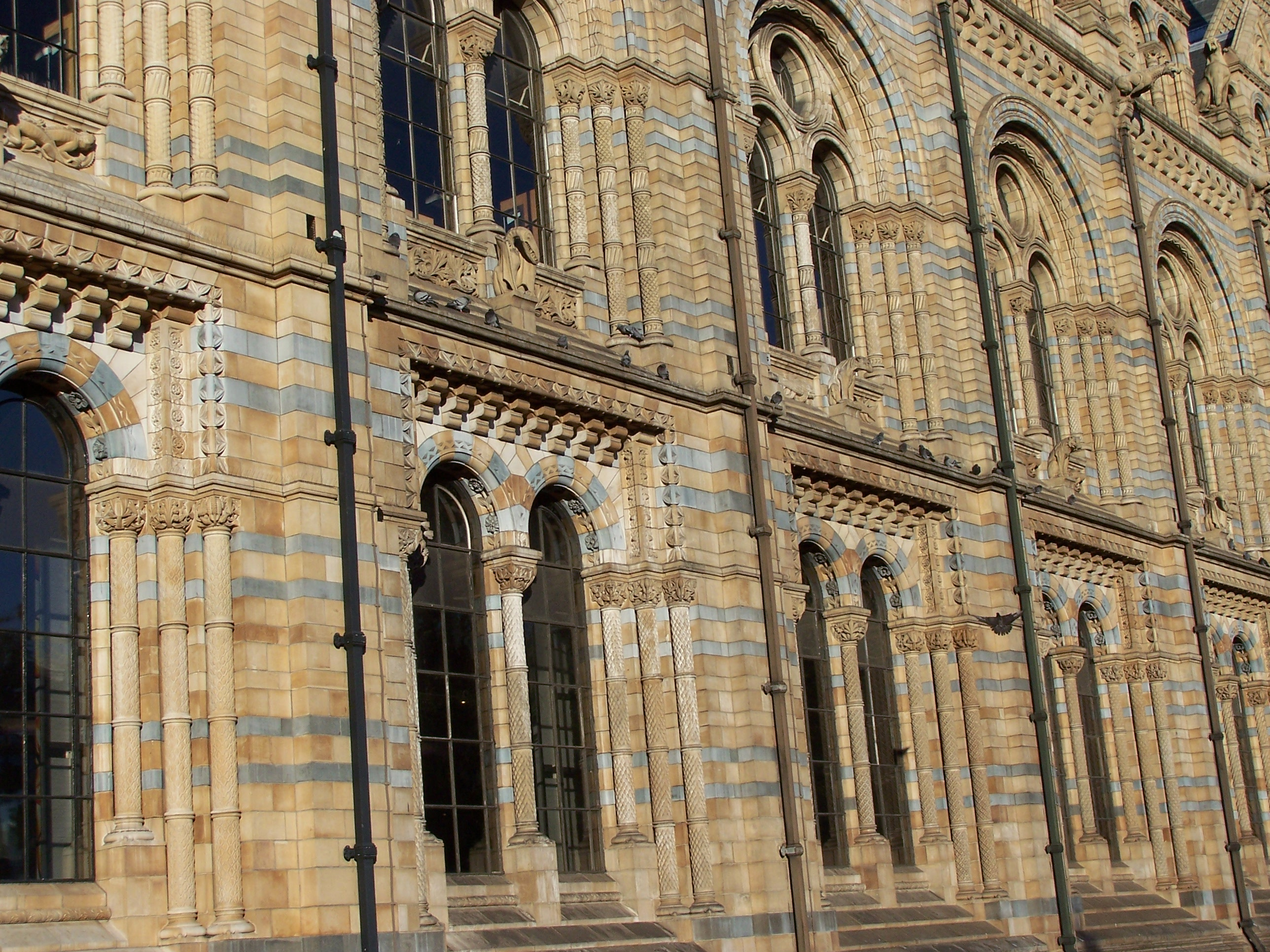
Natural History Museum

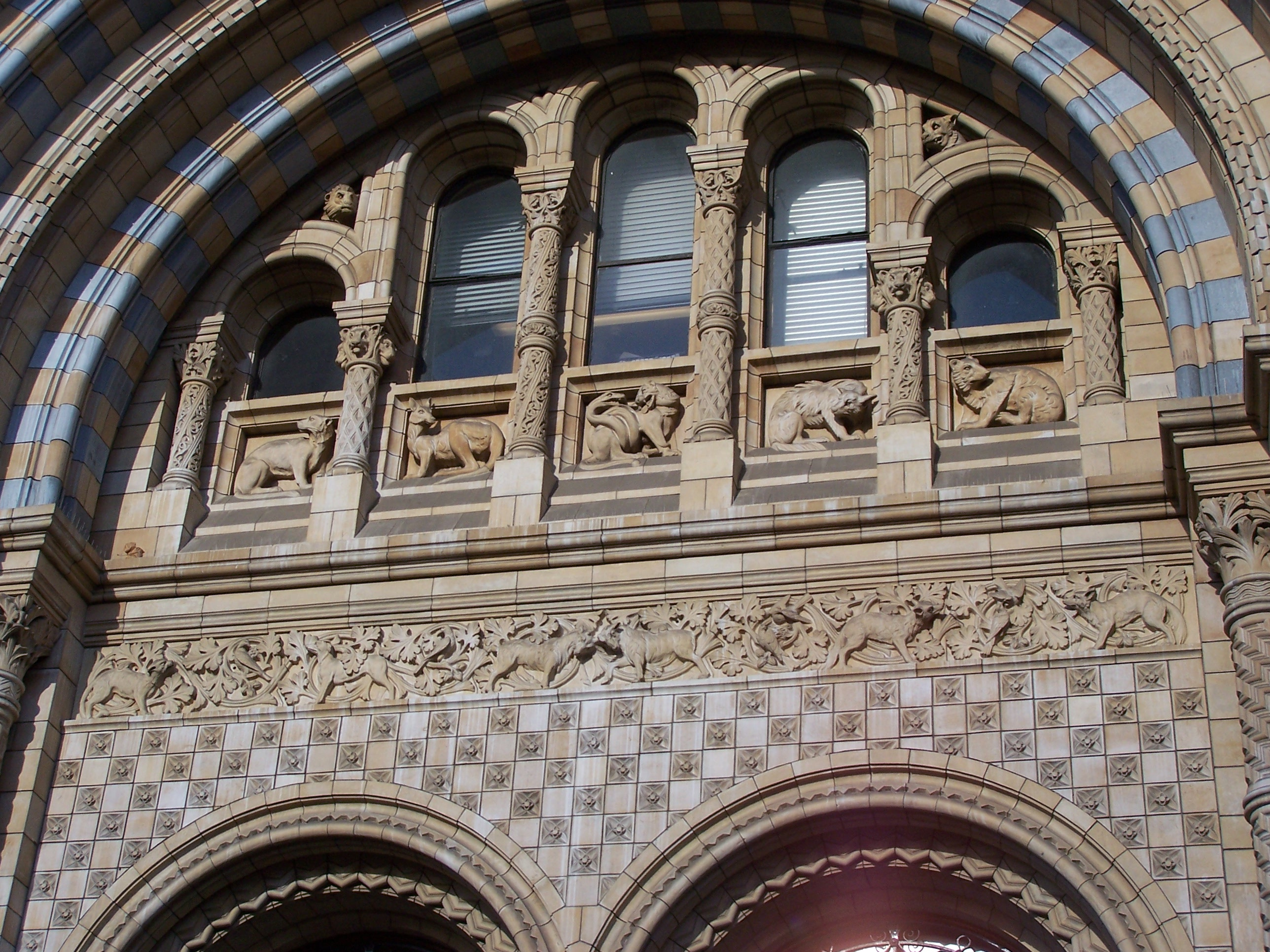
Natural History Museum

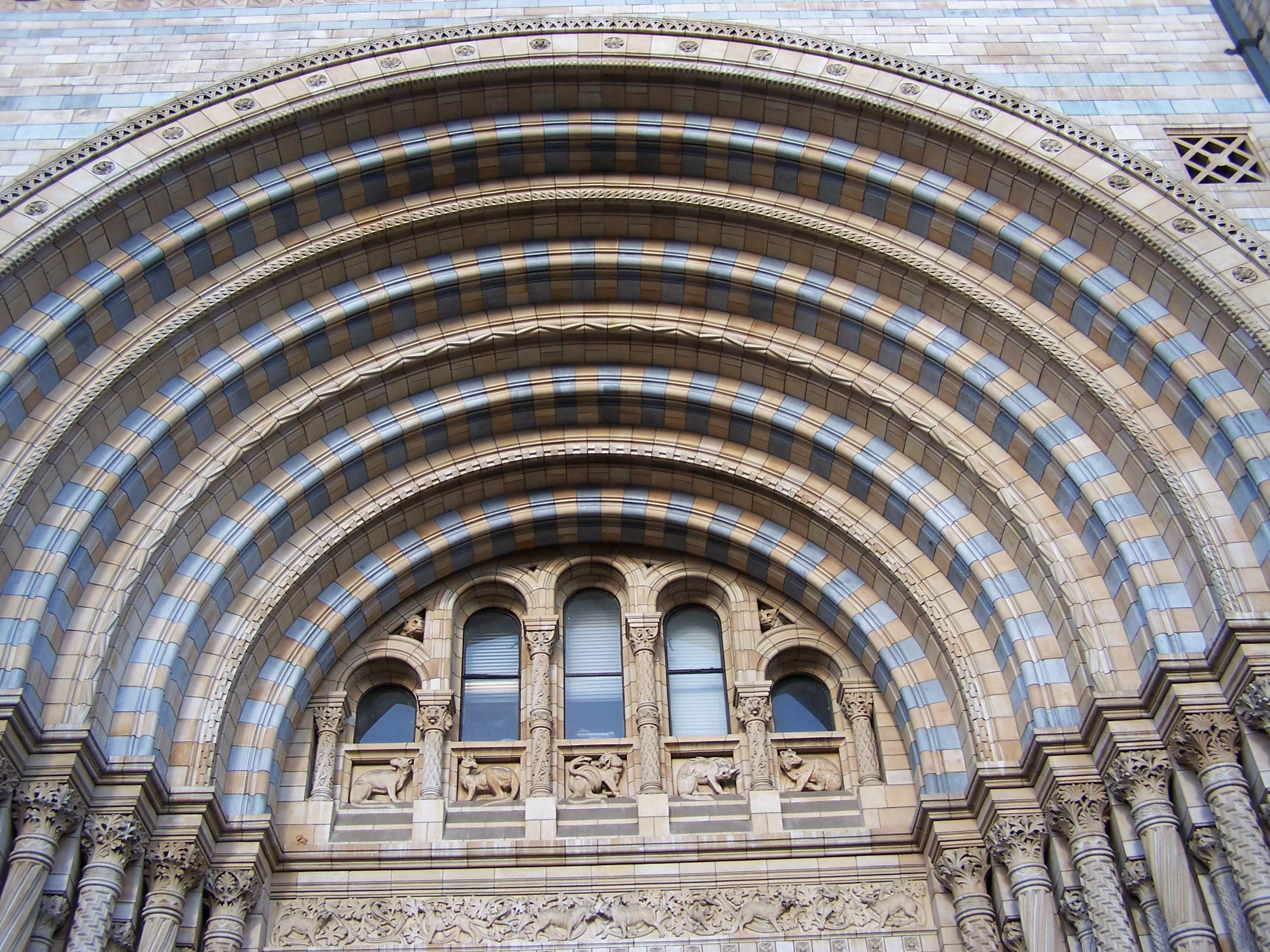
Natural History Museum

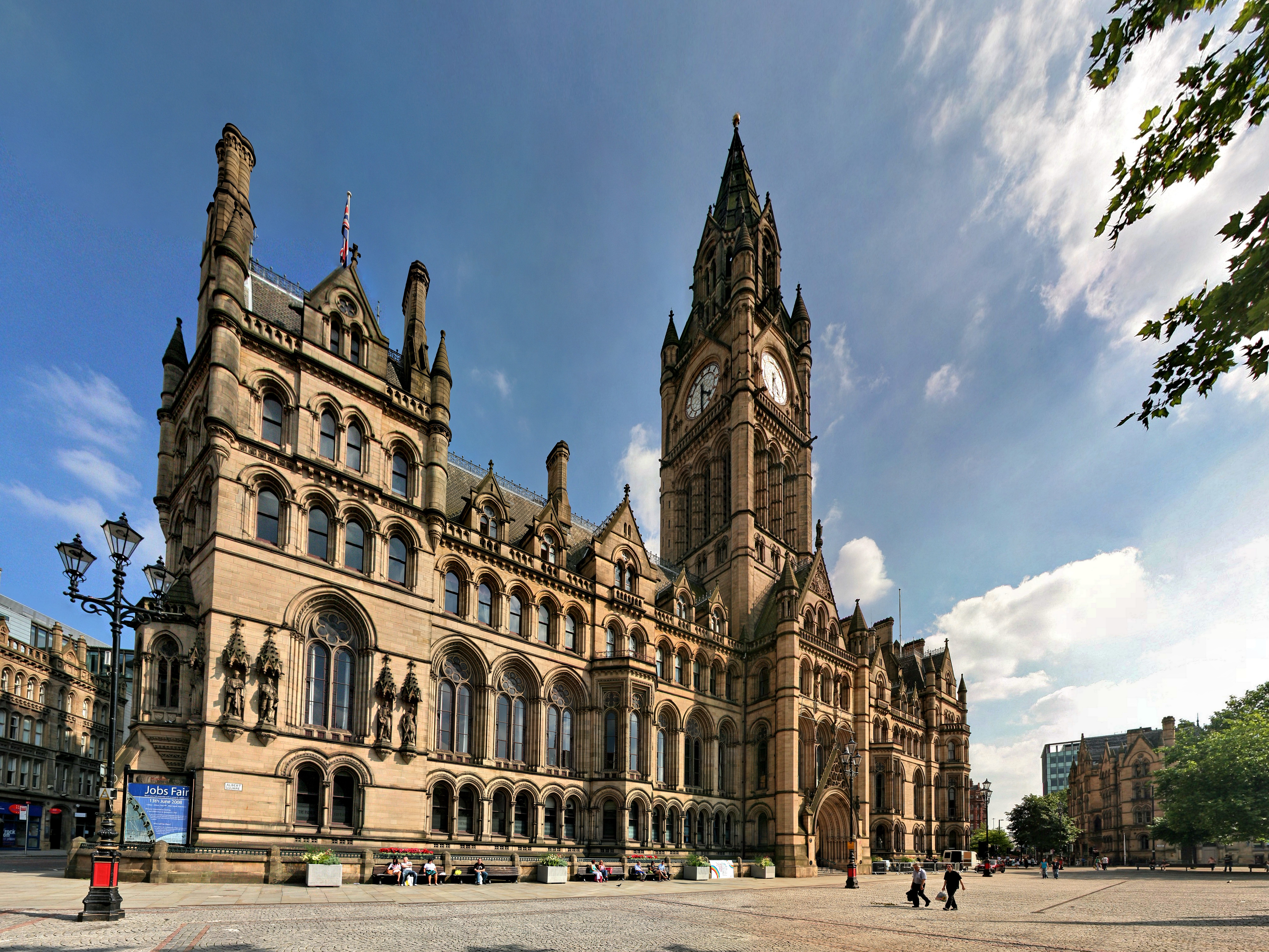
Manchester town hall

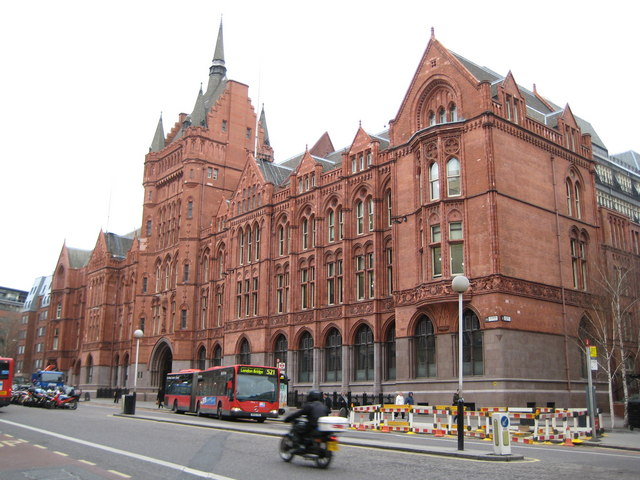
Holborn, Prudential Assurance building, 142 Holborn Bars, EC1

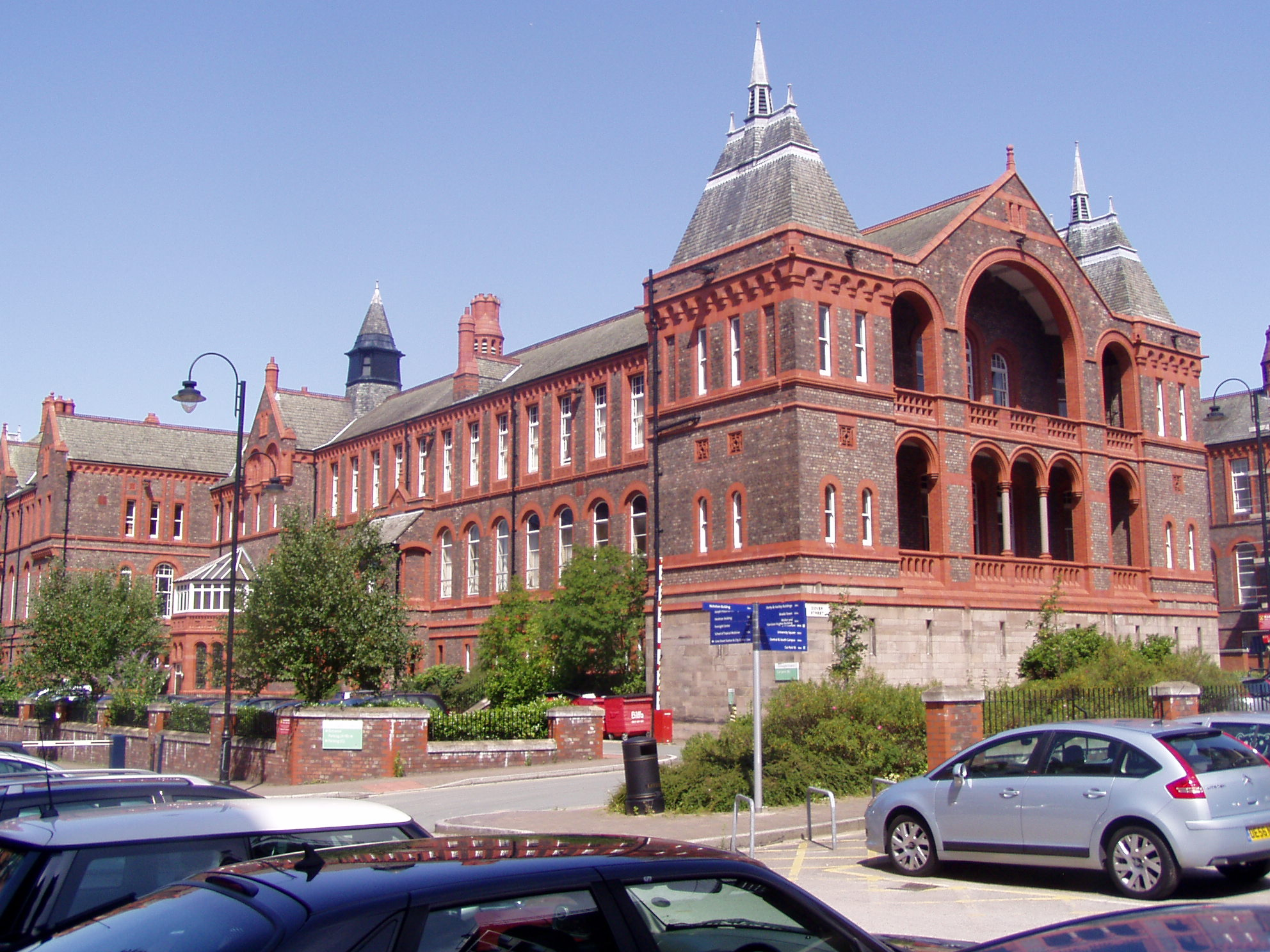
Royal Liverpool Infirmary

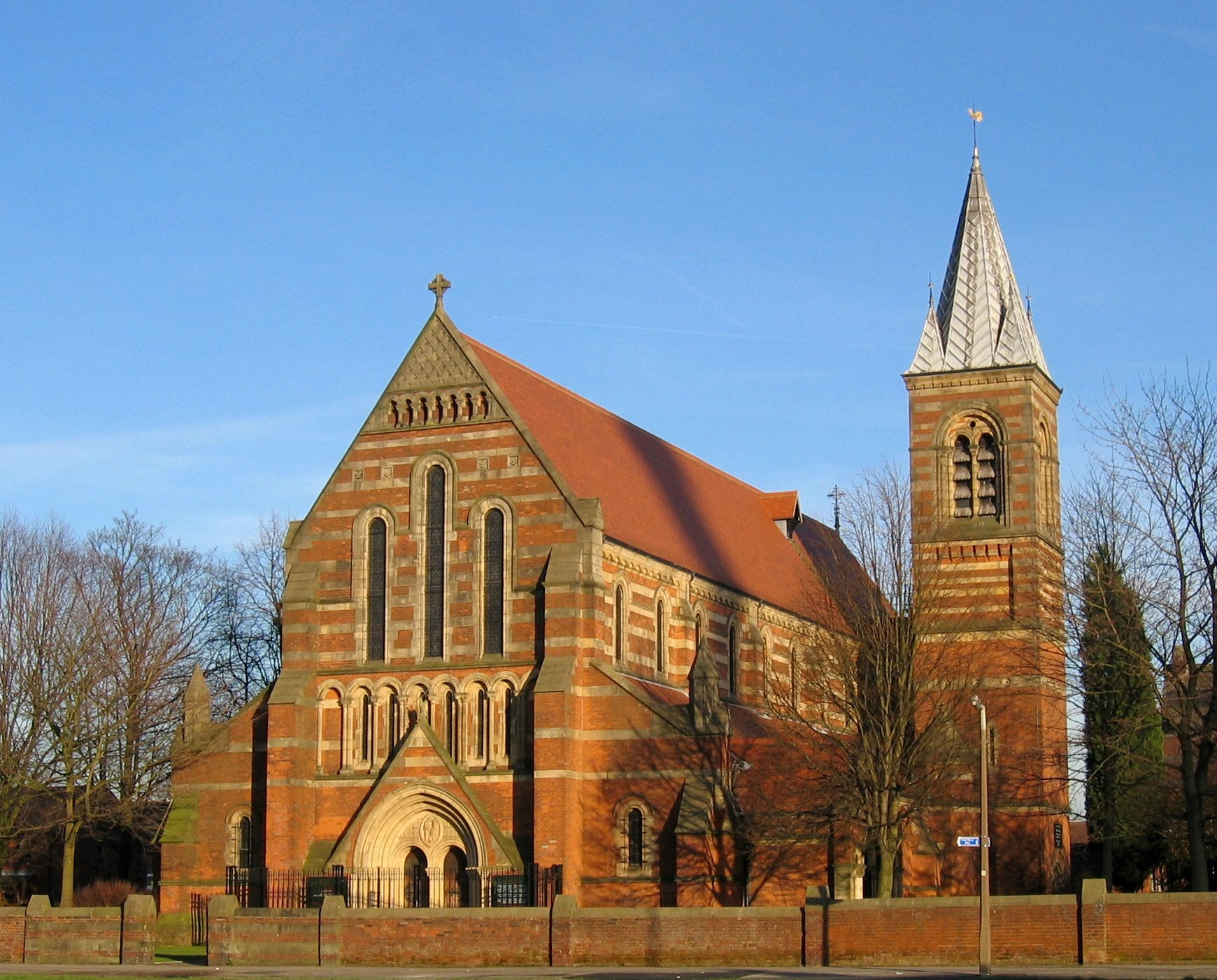
St Elisabeths, Reddish, Stockport

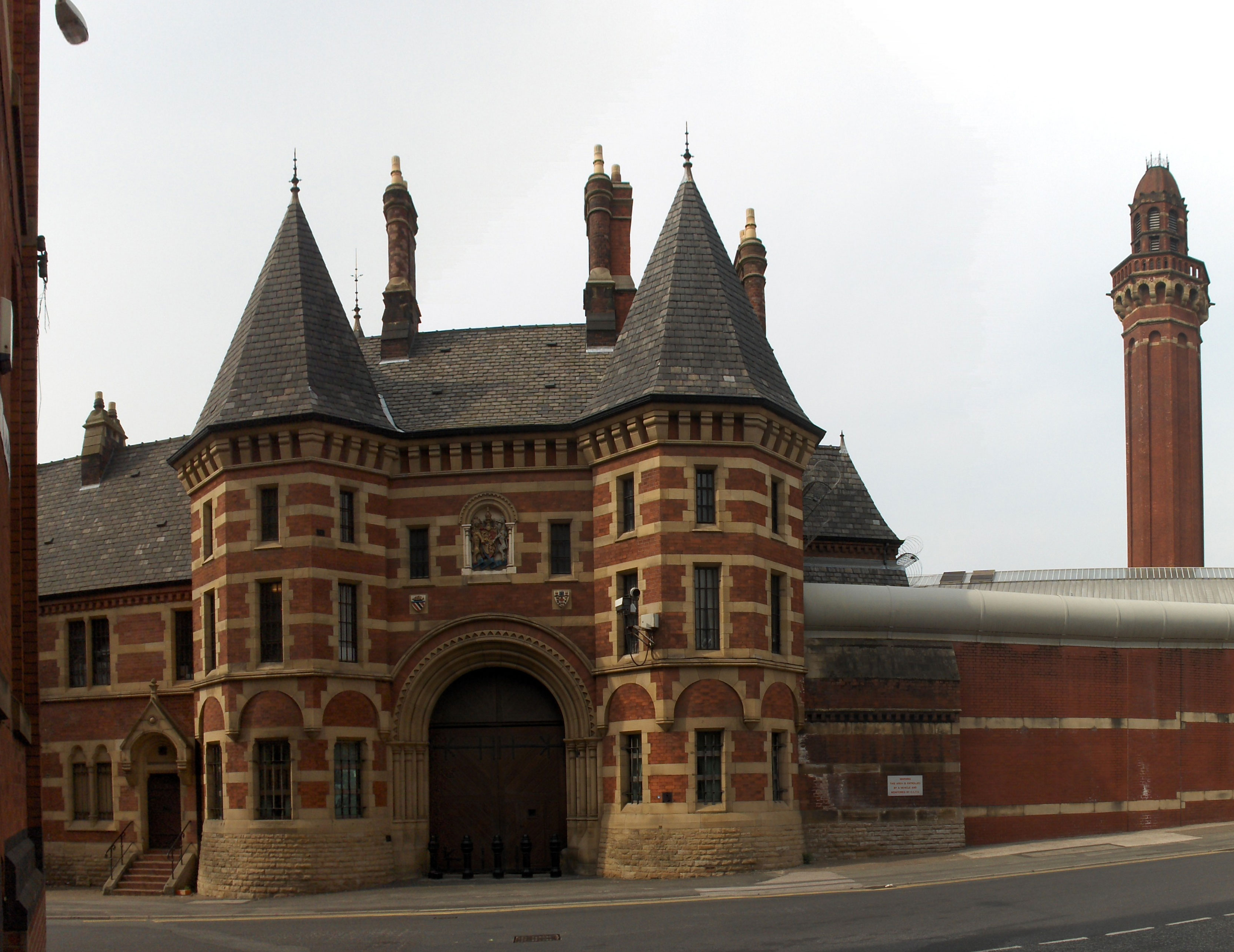
Romanesque portal to Strangeways Prison, Manchester

== Later 19th and 20th century ==
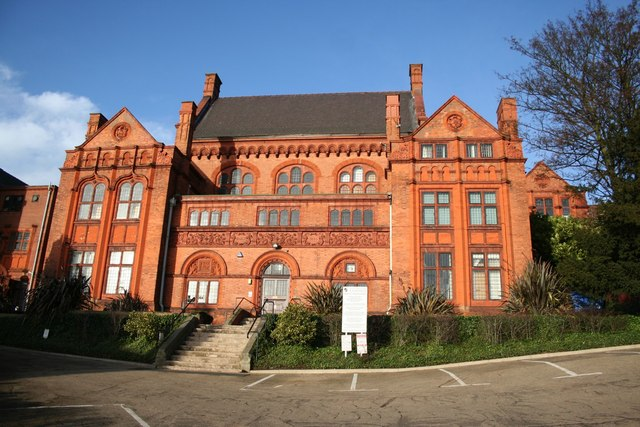
Christ's Hospital Girls School, Lincoln

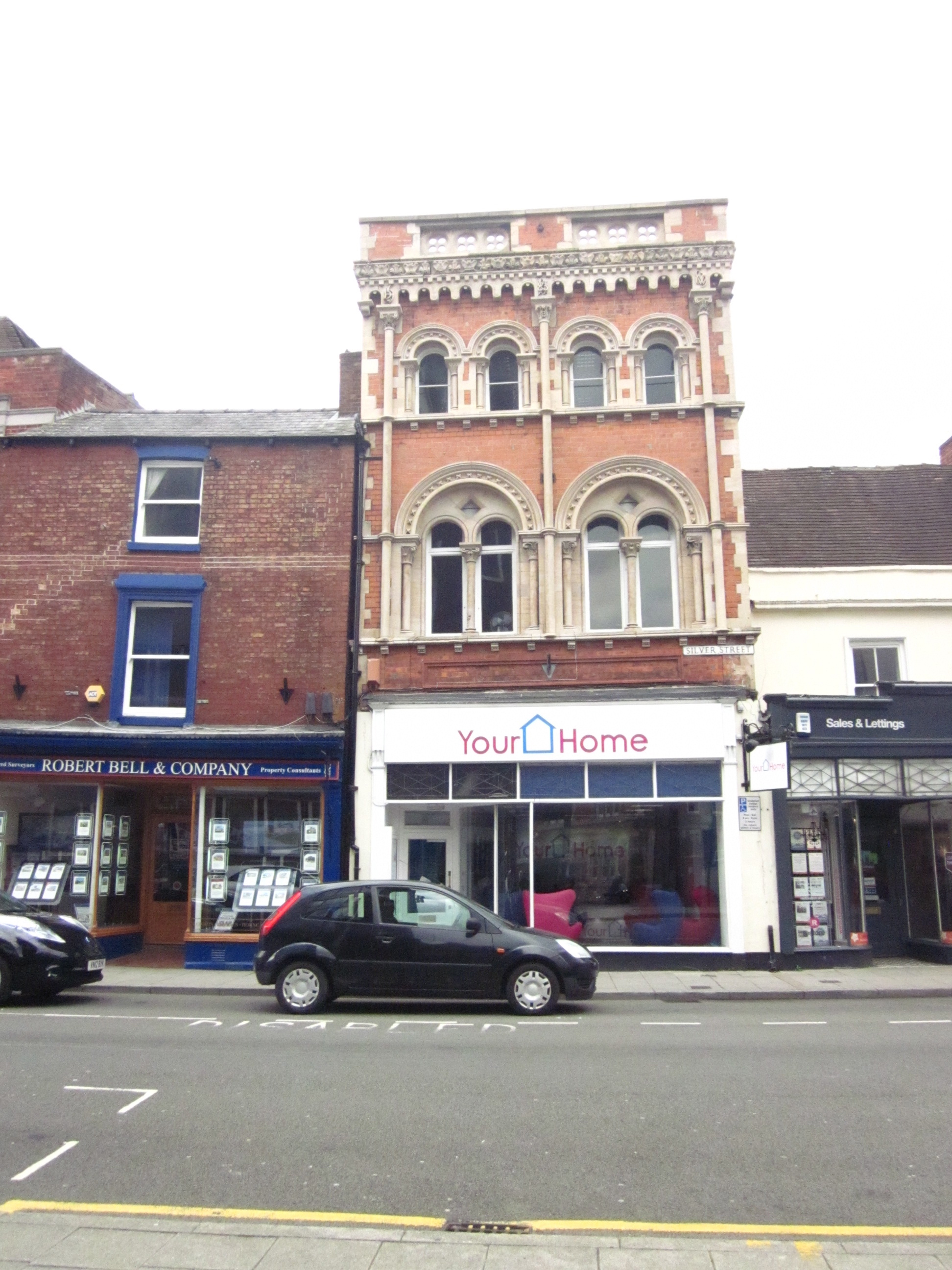
42 Silver Street, Lincoln

Waterhouse inspired other architects to build using terracotta and this material was used by William Watkins, a Lincoln architect who very successfully used a deep red Ruabon terracotta for the Lincoln Christ's Hospital Girls School of 1893. An earlier building by Watkins of 1873, was originally built as a warehouse at 42 Silver Street, Lincoln. This uses artificial stone for Romanesque columns and arches to embellish the frontage.

=== St Aidan's Church, Leeds ===
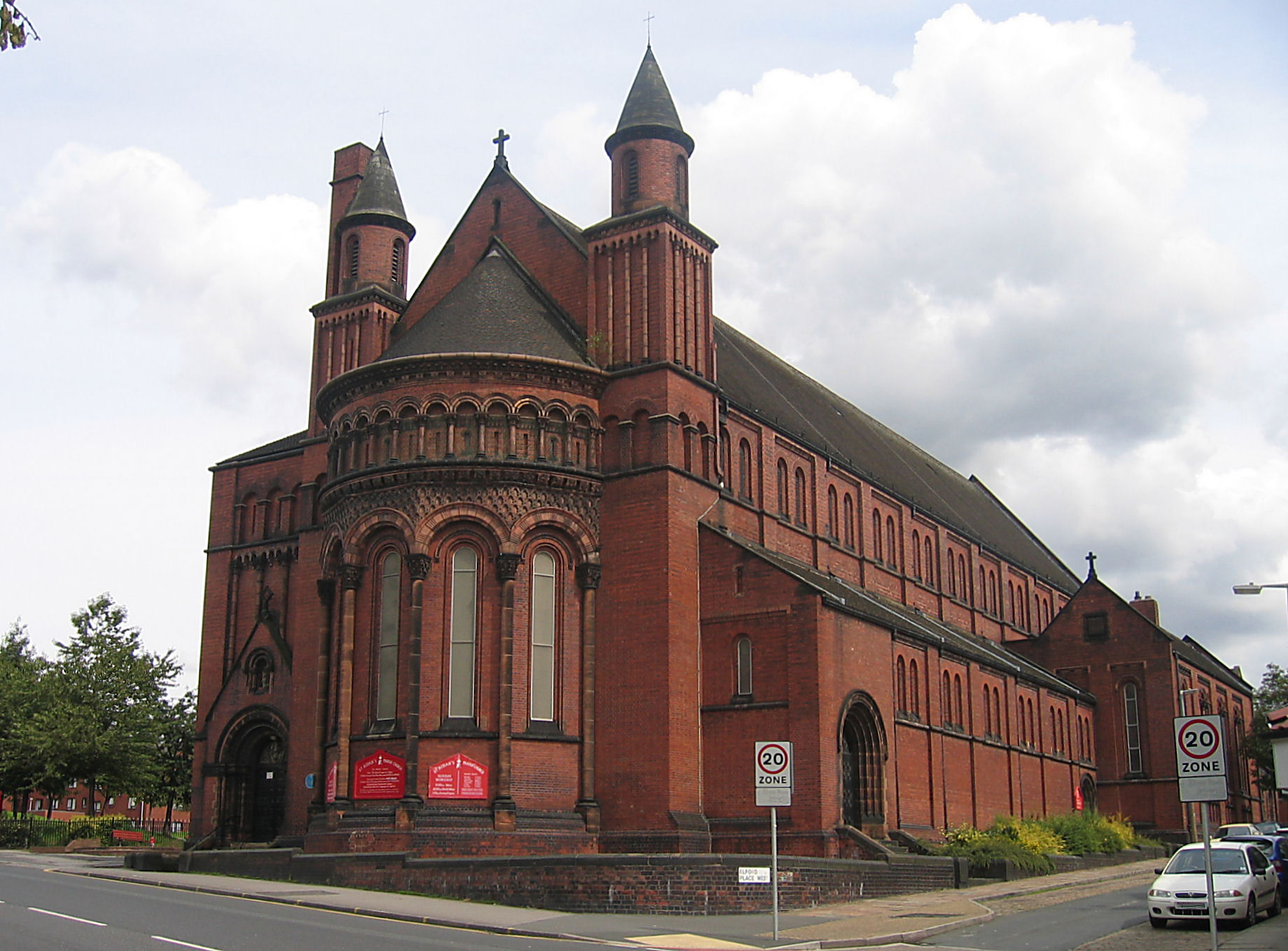
St Aidan's Church, Leeds

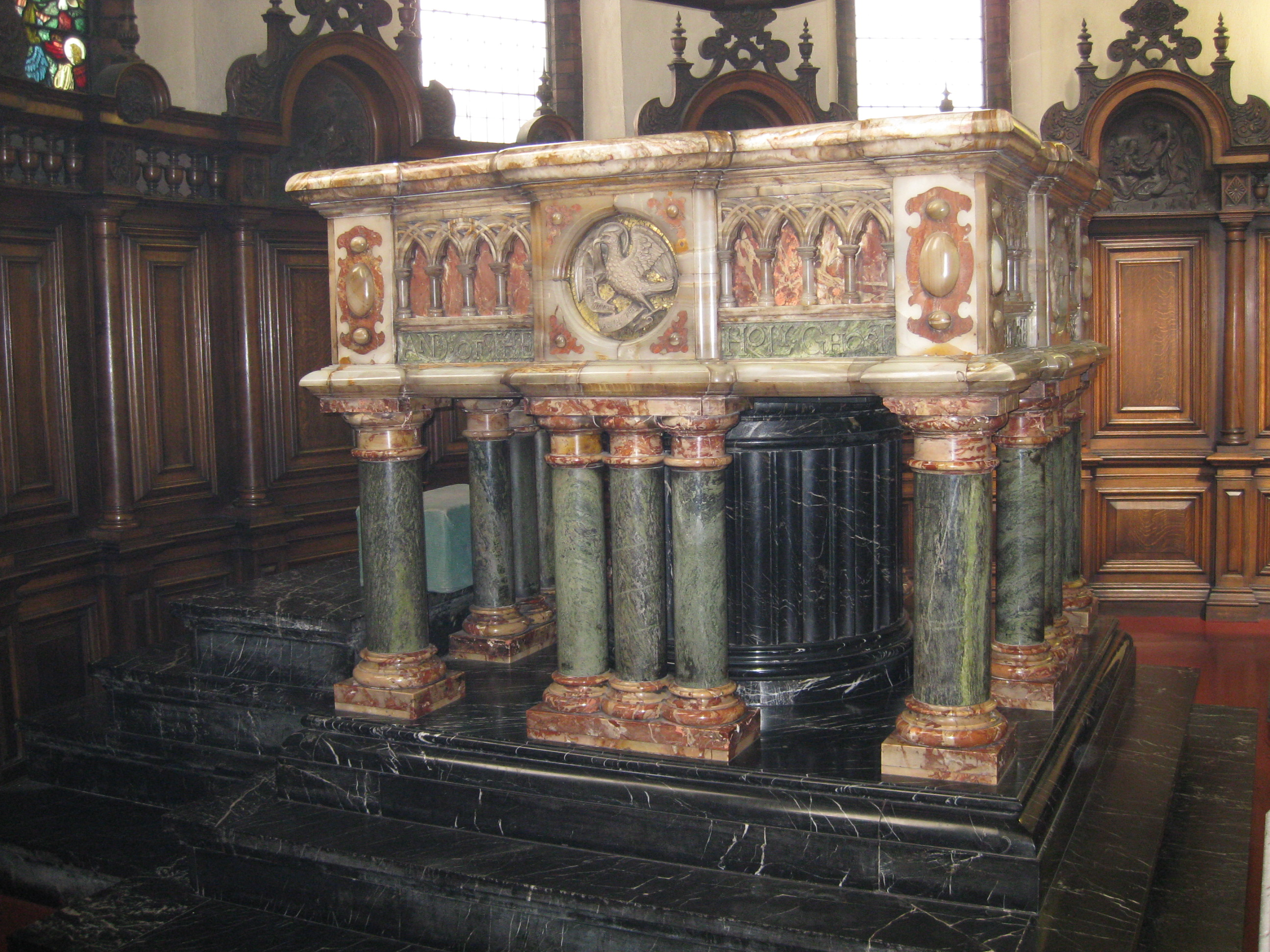
Font at St Aidan's Church, Leeds

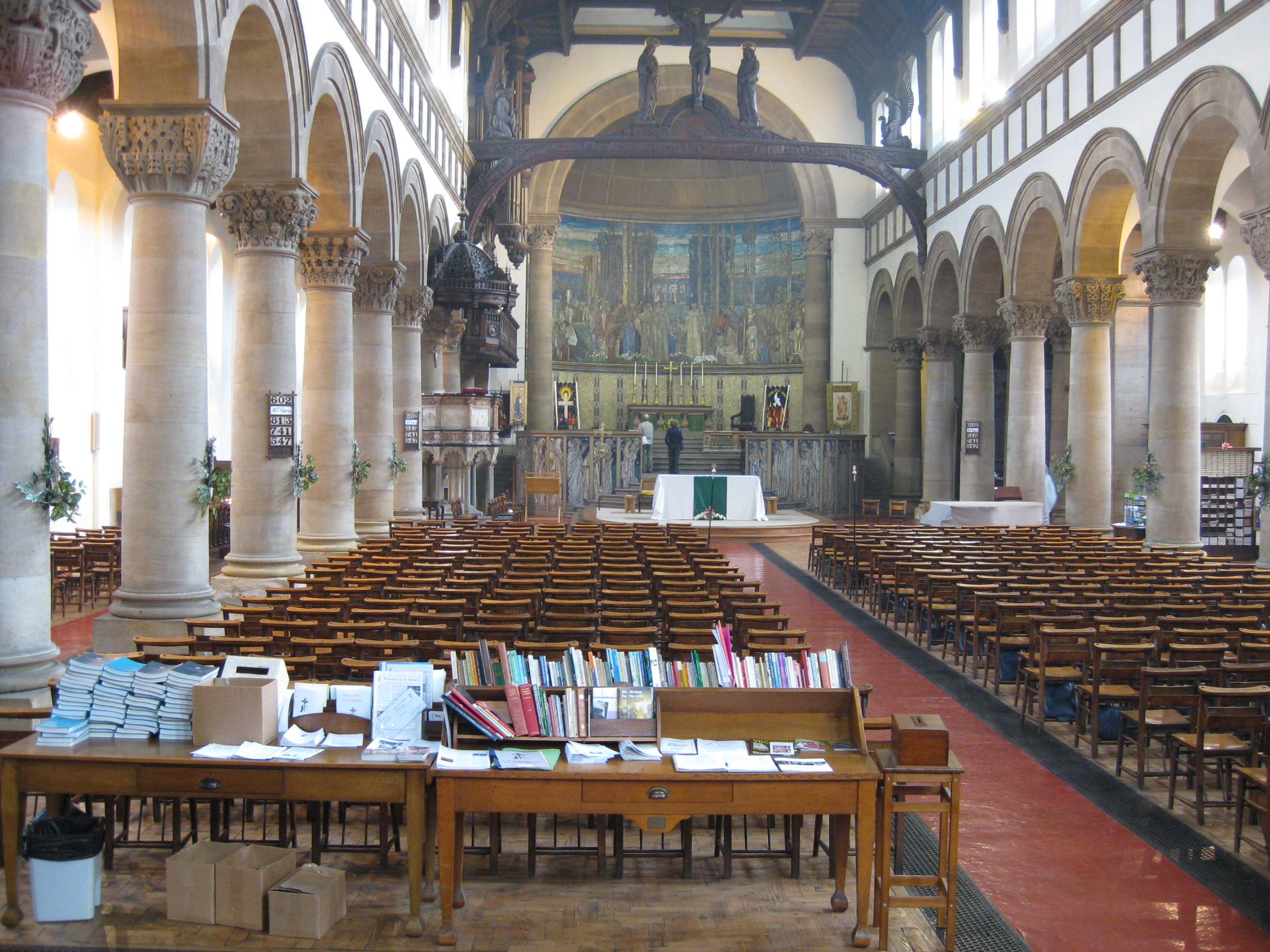
St Aidan's Church, Leeds

St Aidan's Church, Leeds is a massive basilica church built in the tradition of Waterhouse, using red terracotta brickwork. The design was won by competition in 1889 and the church was built between 1891 and 1894 by the Newcastle architects RJ Johnson and A Crawford Hick. The style is a hybrid of Italian, French and German Romanesque and the Corbel table or moulded stringcourse below the eaves was based on that of Lund Cathedral in Sweden. The inside is sumptuously decorated with mosaic decoration by Sir Frank Brangwyn in the apse and a multi-coloured marble font with Romanesque arcading. The interior columns of the basilica have ornamental capitals in the Byzantine style.

=== 20th century ===
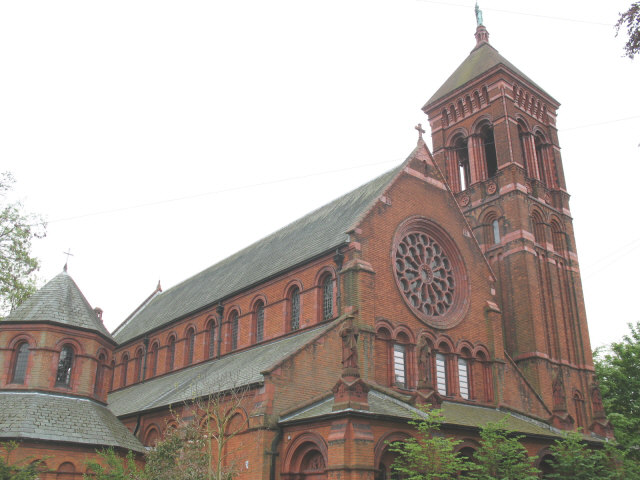
Former church of All Saints, Petersham

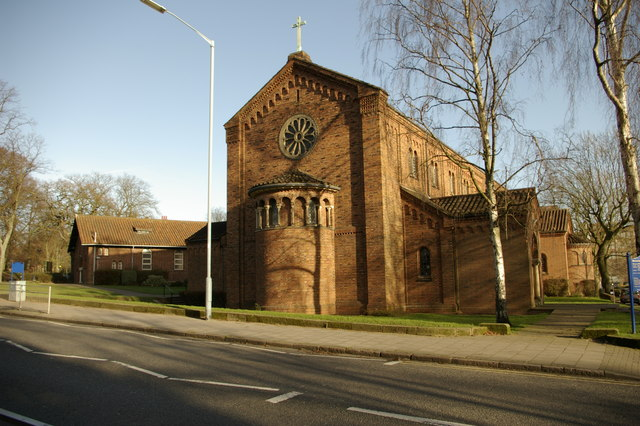
St Francis' Church, Linden Road, Bournville

In the 20th.century the use of the Romanesque revival style in church architecture appears to be restricted to brick built churches and often these churches have similarities with churches built in the Byzantine revival style, which became more popular in the early years of the 20th century. Churches in the Romanesque revival style include All Saints, Bute Avenue, Petersham, Richmond-upon-Thames. This Romanesque revival church was designed by J Kelly and completed in 1908.

An even later example of the style is St Francis, Linden Road, Bournville, consecrated in 1925. This church was designed by Harvey and Wicks, the architects of the Bournville Estate

The early 20th century also saw Continental influences through the French religious exile churches, notably Our Lady of Grace, Charlton (1905-1906), which brought authentic Neo-Romanesque traditions from France to British Catholic architecture during this period of religious persecution and displacement.

== Sources and further reading ==
- Antram, N; Pevsner, N; Harris, J (1989). Lincolnshire. The Buildings of England (revised ed.). New Haven: Yale University Press.
- Brandwood, Geoffrey (2012). Sharpe, Paley and Austin. English Heritage. ISBN 978-1-84802-049-8.
- Clark, Kenneth (1962). The Gothic Revival (3rd ed.). John Murray. ISBN 0719502330.
- Hartwell, Clare; Pevsner, Nikolaus (2009) [1969]. Lancashire: North, The Buildings of England. New Haven and London: Yale University Press. ISBN 978-0-300-12667-9.
- Hughes, John Michael (2010). Edmund Sharpe: Man of Lancaster. J. M. Hughes.
- Leach, P; Pevsner, N (2009). Yorkshire, West Riding. Buildings of England. New Haven: Yale University Press. ISBN 978-0300126655.
- Stratton, M (1993). The Terracotta Revival: Building Innovation and the Industrial City in Britain and Northern America. London: Victor Gollancz Ltd. ISBN 978-0575054332.
