= Rothery =

Rothery is a surname most common in East Sussex in England, where more than 5 per cent of all people with this surname live and where it is the 14th most common surname with 3,359 bearers.

== People ==
- Agnes Rothery (1888–1954), American author
- David Rothery, British planetary science professor
- Henry Cadogan Rothery (1817–1888), English lawyer
- James Rothery (1876–1919, English cricketer
- Steve Rothery (born 1959), English rock guitarist
- Teryl Rothery (born 1962), Canadian actress
- Thomas ap Rhodri (also known as Thomas Rothery, c. 1300–1363), Welsh prince
- William Hume-Rothery (1899–1968), English metallurgist
- William Rothery (1775–1864), British lawyer

== Other ==
- Hume-Rothery rules, rules describing the conditions under which an element could dissolve in a metal, named after William Hume-Rothery
