= Eugène Gervais =

French Belle Époque architect

Eugène-Jacques Gervais
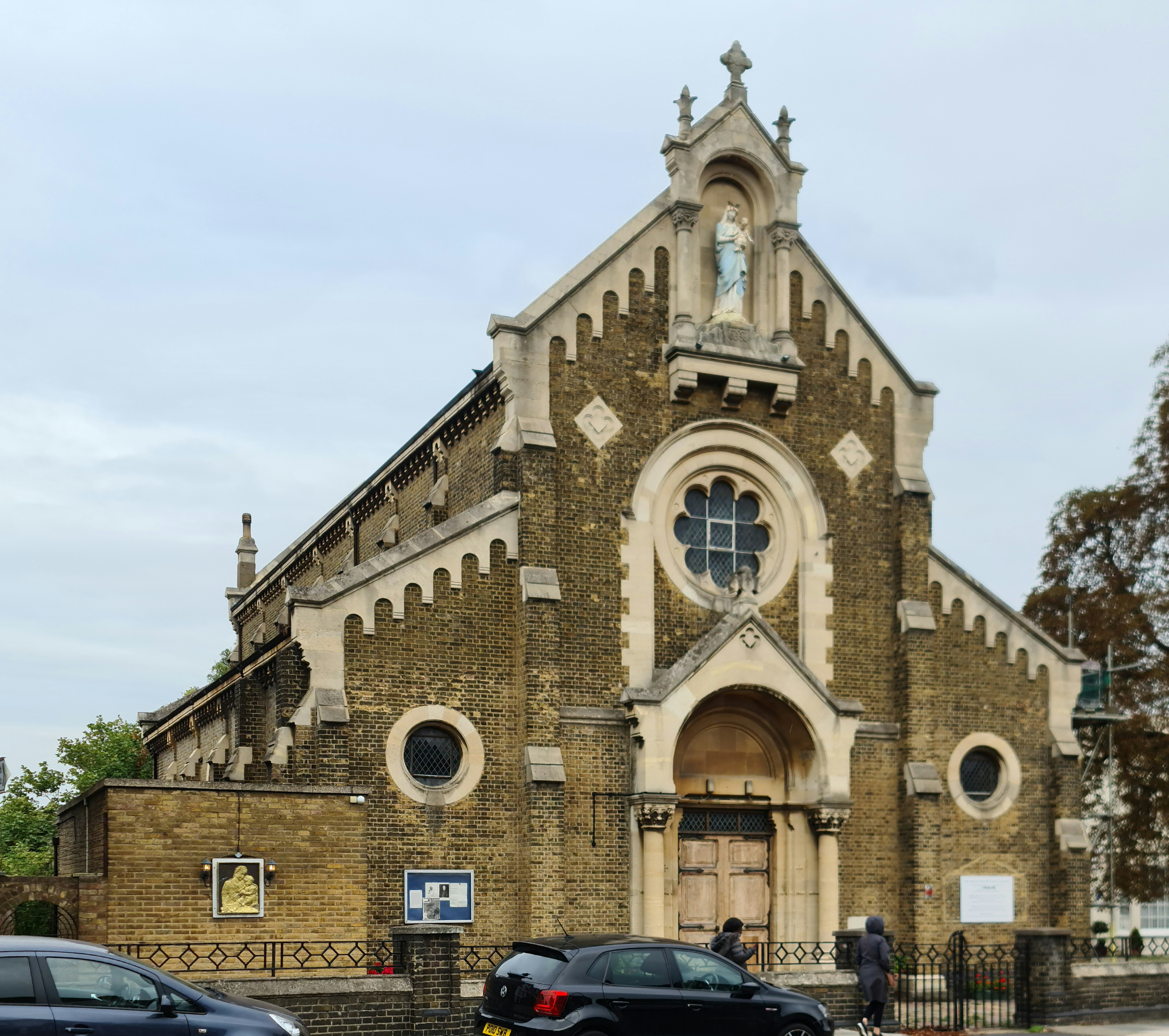
- Our Lady of Grace Church, Charlton (1905-1906), Gervais's most significant surviving work
- Born: 8 April 1852; Bordeaux, France
- Died: 20 May 1943 (aged 91); Bordeaux, France
- Occupation: Architect
- Movement: Belle Époque
- Practice: Bordeaux
- Buildings: Our Lady of Grace Church, Charlton; Villa Kosiki, Royan; Villa Le Paradou, Royan; Grands Bains des Chartrons, Bordeaux; Pavillon de l'Alimentation française, Brussels

Eugène-Jacques Gervais (1852– 1943) was a French architect active during the Belle Époque period. Born in Bordeaux as the son of merchant François Gervais and Clémence-Catherine Descazeille, he married Brigitte-Georgette Moulinié in 1876. The couple had three children, Germaine Gervais (1877-1963), Jeanne Gervais (1887-1943), and Daniel Emile Gervais (1880-1979) who followed his father into architectural practice. Based in Bordeaux, he was known for his eclectic architectural style that combined international influences with innovative construction techniques. His most significant surviving work is Our Lady of Grace Church in Charlton, London, one of the earliest reinforced concrete churches in England, built in the rare Neo-Romanesque style for the Sisters of the Assumption.

== Career ==
Gervais maintained his architectural practice in Bordeaux, holding the official title "Architecte du département de la Gironde" with offices at Place Gambetta 29. This departmental appointment positioned him as the leading establishment figure in Bordeaux architecture. He was a member of the Société archéologique de Bordeaux from 1890, indicating his scholarly approach to architectural practice.

From 1892, Gervais taught architecture at the École municipale des Beaux-Arts de Bordeaux for twenty years, contributing to the education of a new generation of regional architects. In 1912, he formed a professional partnership with his son Daniel as "Gervais père et fils", though this collaboration ended acrimoniously in 1927.

His work was characterised by what he termed "métissage des matériaux" (mixing of materials), creating polychromatic architectural effects through strategic combination of traditional and industrial building components. This innovative approach positioned him among the pioneering architects adapting modern engineering solutions to conventional architectural programmes. He worked with François Hennebique's pioneering reinforced concrete firm as early as 1895, placing him among the first architects to adopt this revolutionary technology.

== Notable works ==
=== Residential architecture ===
In the 1880s, Gervais designed several villas in the fashionable seaside resort of Royan, including Villa Kosiki (1885-1887), a three-storey Japanese pagoda-style residence that predated mainstream European adoption of Japonisme. The villa featured zinc guttering systems terminating in dragon-head gargoyles and was recognised as "one of the most original and remarkable" buildings in Royan's Parc district.

Villa Mon Rêve (1885-1886), commissioned for Georges Malboz, exemplified Gervais's eclectic castle revival style, combining Anglo-Saxon bow-windows with Flemish stepped gables. Both villas survived the devastating Allied bombardments of January 1945 that destroyed approximately 4,000 of Royan's pre-war structures.

Villa Le Paradou (1886) on Boulevard Garnier gained cultural significance through its association with novelist Émile Zola, who resided there between 1886-1888. The villa was demolished in 1978.

=== Theatre architecture ===
The Théâtre des Arts (1889) at 9 rue Castelnau d'Auros, Bordeaux, demonstrated Gervais's versatility in cultural building design.

=== Civic architecture ===
The Grands Bains des Chartrons (1895) in Bordeaux represented Gervais's most architecturally innovative work, combining Moorish Revival styling with pioneering industrial construction techniques. The building featured a decorative street facade with an impressive "Eiffelesque" structure using the Hennebique reinforced concrete system, combining iron, wood, and glass housing functional bathing facilities. The complex accommodated 70 individual bathtubs across 63 private cubicles and was recognised as "the most vast and comfortable establishment of this type in Bordeaux."

=== Exhibition architecture ===
The Pavillon de l'Alimentation française at the Brussels International Exposition (1897) represented Gervais's entry into international exhibition design. Contemporary press coverage in La Gazette des bains de mer described the pavilion as "une merveille de goût et d'originalité" (a marvel of taste and originality) and identified it as one of the "clous de l'Exposition" (highlights of the Exhibition). The exposition attracted 7.8 million visitors, with Gervais's pavilion showcasing French culinary and agricultural excellence. The commission for a French national pavilion at a major world's fair confirmed his standing among France's leading architects.

=== Ecclesiastical architecture ===
Our Lady of Grace Church (1905-1906) in Charlton, London represents Gervais's most significant documented work and demonstrates his international professional reputation. Commissioned by the Sisters of the Assumption following their exile from France, the church employed Neo-Romanesque architecture, rare for Catholic churches in England during this period. The church forms part of a significant heritage complex alongside the Grade II listed Highcombe House, one of the last surviving Regency villas from the historic Eastcombe estate. Gervais managed this international project entirely from Bordeaux through correspondence, demonstrating exceptional professional capabilities for the era. The £5,000 construction cost represented substantial investment for an Edwardian Catholic parish.

== Legacy ==
Gervais's architectural approach anticipated several modernist concerns including material innovation, international cultural synthesis, and environmental responsiveness whilst maintaining the decorative richness characteristic of Belle Époque architectural culture. His work represents transitional developments between nineteenth-century historicism and twentieth-century architectural modernism.

The survival of his key works through wartime destruction, particularly the Royan villas that represent rare examples of Belle Époque seaside architecture, provides exceptional documentation of late nineteenth-century French architectural innovation.

== See also ==
- Our Lady of Grace Church, Charlton
- Highcombe House
