= Our Lady of Grace Church, Charlton =

Roman Catholic church in Charlton, London

Coordinates: 51°28′47″N 0°01′37″E

Our Lady of Grace Church
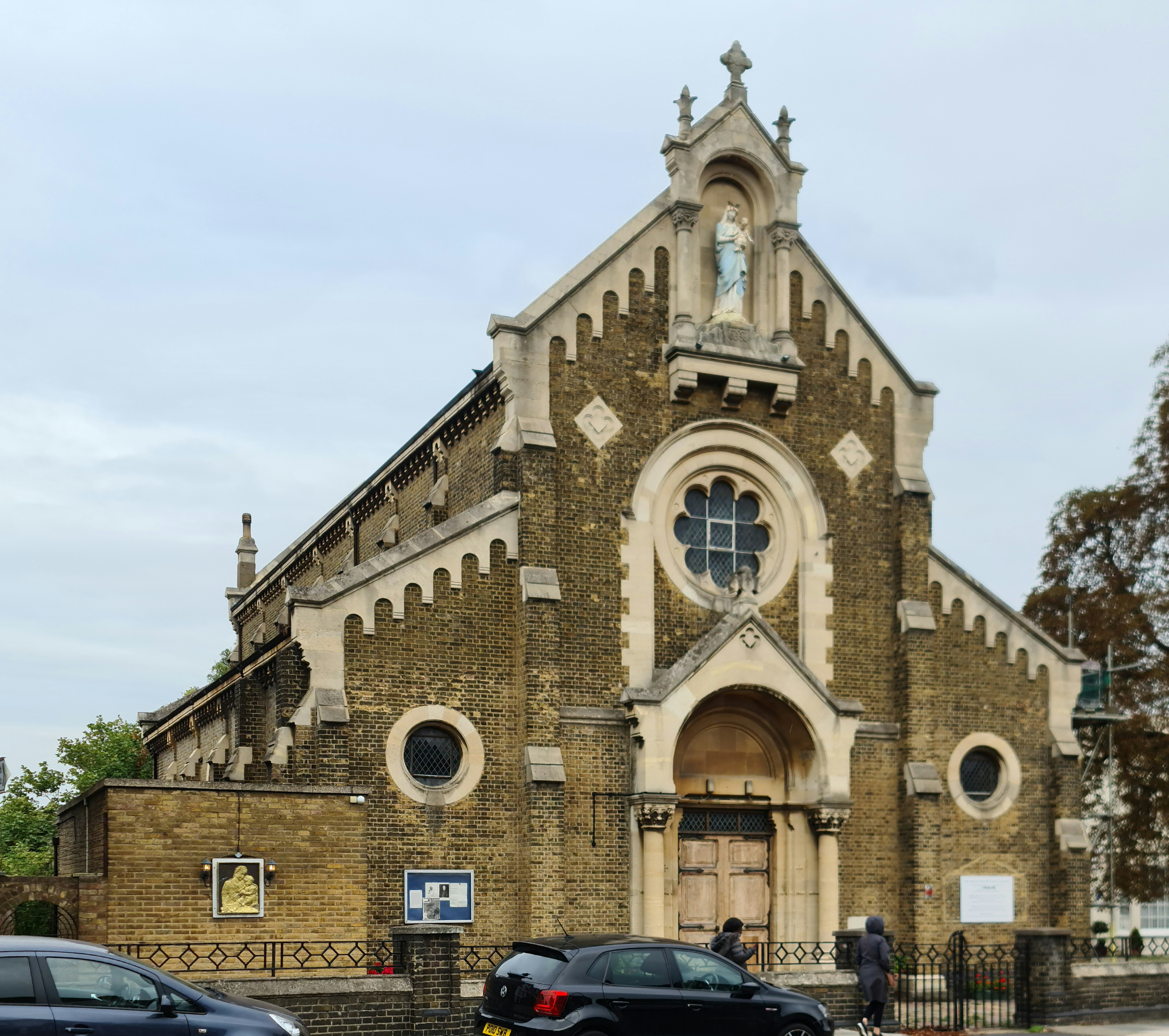
- Our Lady of Grace Church
- OS grid reference: TQ 40848 77592
- Location: Charlton, Royal Borough of Greenwich
- Country: England
- Denomination: Roman Catholic
- Website: https://olg-charlton.simdif.com/

History
- Status: Parish church
- Founded: 1905–1906
- Founder: Oblates of the Assumption
- Dedication: Our Lady of Grace
- Dedicated: 8 September 1906
- Consecrated: 13 September 1960

Architecture
- Functional status: Active
- Architect: Eugène-Jacques Gervais
- Style: Neo-Romanesque
- Groundbreaking: 27 August 1905
- Completed: 1906

Specifications
- Materials: Stock brick with stone dressings; reinforced concrete and reinforced brickwork internal structure; slate roof

Administration
- Diocese: Southwark
- Parish: Our Lady of Grace

Our Lady of Grace Church is a Roman Catholic church in Charlton, Royal Borough of Greenwich, London. Built between 1905 and 1906 in Neo-Romanesque style, it was designed by the French architect Eugène-Jacques Gervais (1852–1943) for the Oblates of the Assumption as part of their international mission work in England following the French religious exile of 1901-1914.

== History ==
=== Origins and establishment ===
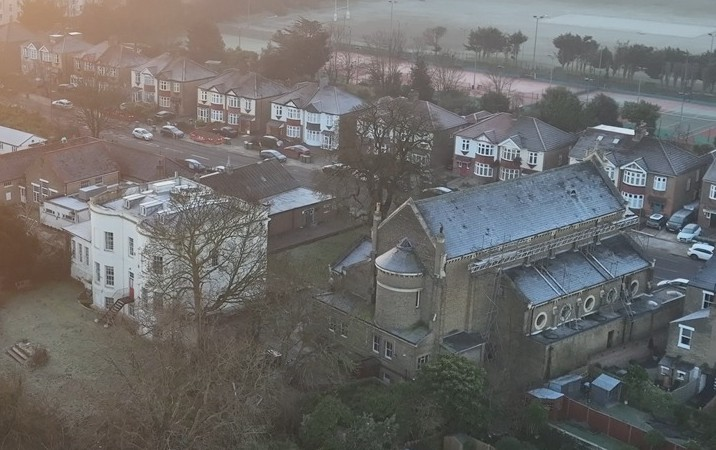
Aerial view of Our Lady of Grace church, from northwest

In 1903, following their exile from France due to anti-clerical legislation, a community of the Oblate Sisters of the Assumption was established in Charlton by purchasing a private residence, Highcombe House. The purchase was made in coordination with the Augustinians of the Assumption and the Diocese of Southwark. This impressive property, built around 1825, had a distinguished history, having been home to several notable figures including Sir William Congreve, 2nd Baronet (1772–1828), a prolific inventor, and William Henry Barlow (1812–1902), who had designed the roof of St Pancras station and is commemorated with an English Heritage blue plaque. Highcombe House and its gardens, now serving as a community centre and presbytery, is a Grade II listed building and one of only two surviving structures from the historic Westcombe and Eastcombe estates that once dominated the area between Greenwich and Charlton Village.

Mass was first celebrated in the house on 18 July 1903 by Fr Benedict Caron, A.A., who became the first mission priest. The chapel was opened to local residents, gradually establishing a Catholic mission in the area.

The foundation stone for the present church was laid on 27 August 1905 by Bishop Amigo. The building was opened a year later, on 8 September 1906, by Fr Darbois, Superior of the Assumptionist Mission in New York. The dedication to Our Lady of Grace was chosen because of a pre-Reformation shrine to Our Lady of Grace that had existed in the area.

=== Later developments ===
Between 1925 and 1927, new furnishings were added to the church, including a new organ, pulpit, and benches carved by Fr Gregory Chedal A.A. This coincided with the purchase of Woodlands House for use as a convent.

The church underwent significant restoration and expansion in 1959 under Fr Walter Robertson A.A., the first English parish priest. This work included the addition of an outer north aisle, strengthening of the foundations, installation of a concrete floor, remodeling of the high altar, and complete redecoration. The church was consecrated by Bishop Cowderoy on 13 September 1960.

The mission was developed by the Assumptionists, who had been involved alongside the Oblate Sisters from the foundation in 1903. The Assumptionists served the parish until 1989, when they handed pastoral care over to diocesan clergy. The adjacent Highcombe House continues to be recognised by Historic England as a Grade II listed building, formally designated as the "Presbytery to East of Church of Our Lady of Grace".

=== Educational connection ===
The church maintains a close relationship with Our Lady of Grace Catholic Primary School, which was established by the parish in 1928. The Oblate Sisters of the Assumption, from 1903, established a lasting educational legacy at Highcombe House, transforming the property into a spiritual and educational centre. Their dedication to Catholic education laid the foundation for the modern Our Lady of Grace Primary School that continues to serve the local community today, representing over a century of continuous educational service on the site.

== Architecture ==
=== Church ===
The church is built in neo-Romanesque style, rare for Catholic churches in England during this period when Gothic Revival was more prevalent. The style represents one of the few examples of Continental Romanesque Revival traditions in British Catholic architecture. The building is constructed of stock brick laid in English bond, with stone dressings and a slate roof, and was undertaken by Jones & Sons of Erith, representing a substantial investment for a Catholic parish in Edwardian England. The church is one of the earliest in England to use reinforced concrete extensively in its construction, employing this innovative technology in columns, arches, and vaults.

The west elevation features buttresses dividing the nave and aisles, blind arcading below the eaves, and an aedicule niche with a statue of the Madonna and Child. Below are a cusped circular window and the west doors within a gabled porch.

The interior has a five-bay nave with a barrel vault, supported by Corinthian columns with scagliola shafts. Instead of a clerestorey with windows, there is a triforium with quatrefoils in circles containing symbols from the Litany of Loreto.

Originally, the sanctuary featured a dramatic statue of the Virgin and Child standing on clouds, lit by concealed windows in the apse, reportedly inspired by a similar arrangement at St Sulpice in Paris. During the 1959 restoration, this was replaced with a painting of Our Lady of Grace (a copy of an icon from the Augustinian Church of S. Patrizio in Rome) and a rood cross.

Notable interior features include timber benches carved by Fr Gregory Chedal A.A. in the 1920s, The tribune gallery on the south side also likely dates from the 1920s rather than the original construction. Stations of the Cross carved by Virgilio Prugger and painted by Henry Farmer (c.1959), and an octagonal timber pulpit carved with the Four Evangelists and Christ.

=== Highcombe House and gardens ===
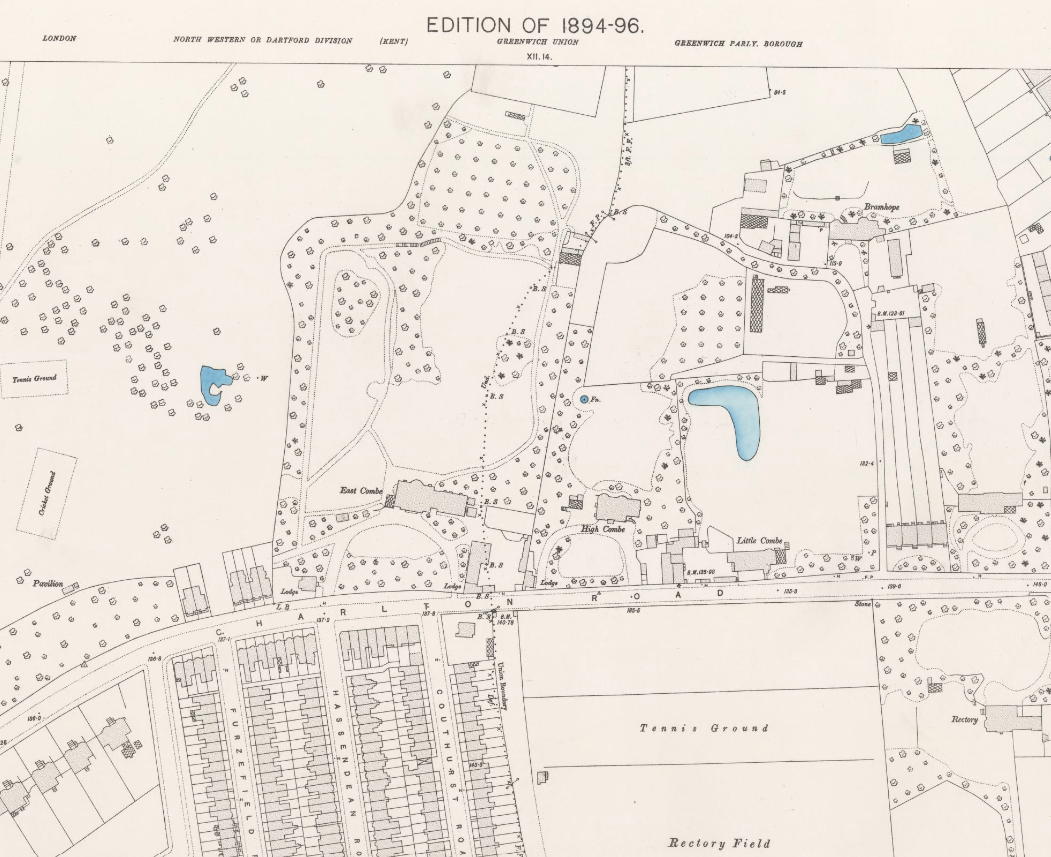
Eastcombe Estate in Charlton in 1893

Highcombe House and its gardens serve as both a community centre and presbytery. This Grade II listed early-to-mid 19th century villa is described in the Historic England listing as a two-storey stucco house with a slate hipped roof and deep eaves. The building features a semi-circular bays on the front and rear elevations and retains many original architectural elements.

Highcombe House the last surviving property of a collection of historic mansions that once formed the Eastcombe estate in Charlton, as shown in an Ordnance Survey map from 1895, offering views across London. The estate has been home to various aristocrats, military leaders and public figures throughout its history.

The house is believed to have been commissioned by Sir William Congreve, 2nd Baronet, around 1825. Congreve, a Member of Parliament for Plymouth and personal friend of King George IV, was a prolific inventor whose Congreve Rocket inspired Francis Scott Key to write the phrase "the rockets' red glare" in "The Star-Spangled Banner", the national anthem of the United States. After Congreve's death in 1828, the property had several occupants, including General Sir George Whitmore (1851–1862), Commandant of the Royal Military Academy at Woolwich, before William Henry Barlow acquired it around 1865. Barlow was an engineer who designed London's St Pancras Station and the second Tay Bridge.

Other notable residents of the broader Eastcombe estate included: Sir Captain William Saunderson (Clockhouse/Eastcombe 1, 1710–1727) of HM Yacht William and Mary; Lieutenant General Sir William Congreve (Clockhouse/Eastcombe 1, 1780–82 and 1795–1805), who founded the gunpowder factory at Waltham Abbey; John Hooke-Campbell (Clockhouse/Eastcombe 1, 1782–1795), Lord Lyon King of Arms, Scotland; Eleanor Agnes Hobart, Countess of Buckinghamshire (Eastcombe House 2, 1816–1851), widow of Robert Hobart, Colonial Secretary and namesake of Hobart, Tasmania; Lady Charlotte Maryon Wilson (1808–1895) (Little Combe, 1876–1895) of the Maryon Wilson Baronet family of Charlton House, whose ancestral estate included substantial landholdings across southeast London.

A portrait of Mrs Rebecca Congreve and her children is thought to show Eastcombe House 1. Then Captain William Congreve with his elder son William can be seen central on the rear wall again by Reinagle. William Congreve the dramatist can be seen above the fire place. This painting reveals how the fashionable Georgian home was decorated with floral carpet, girandole mirrors and mantelpiece ornaments.

Today, Highcombe House continues to serve the community, providing both parish administration facilities and space for community gatherings and events.
