= Woodlands House =

Grade II* listed Georgian villa in southeast London, England

Coordinates: 51.4796°N 0.01733°E

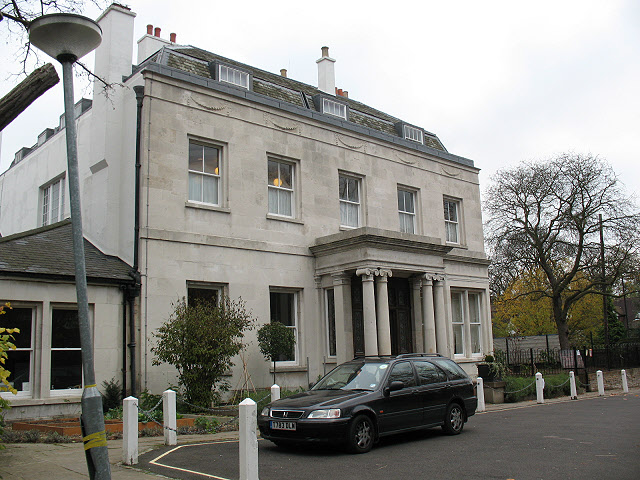
Woodlands House

Woodlands House is a Grade II* listed Georgian villa, nextdoor to Mycenae House, Mycenae Road, in the Westcombe Park area of the Royal Borough of Greenwich, in southeast London. Having previously been used as a convent, from 1972 to 2003 the building served as a library and art museum, known as the Woodlands Art Gallery. Today it houses a Steiner School.

== History ==
The building was built on a site leased in 1774 from Sir Gregory Page by John Julius Angerstein (a Lloyd's underwriter). Angerstein made his fortune in the East Indian trade as well as having West Indian business links, including a third share in a slave plantation in Grenada. His art collection was bought in 1824 to form the nucleus of the National Gallery, London. Angerstein occupied a house in nearby Crooms Hill, Greenwich, while the villa was constructed over the next two years to a design by local architect George Gibson and was completed in the summer of 1776.

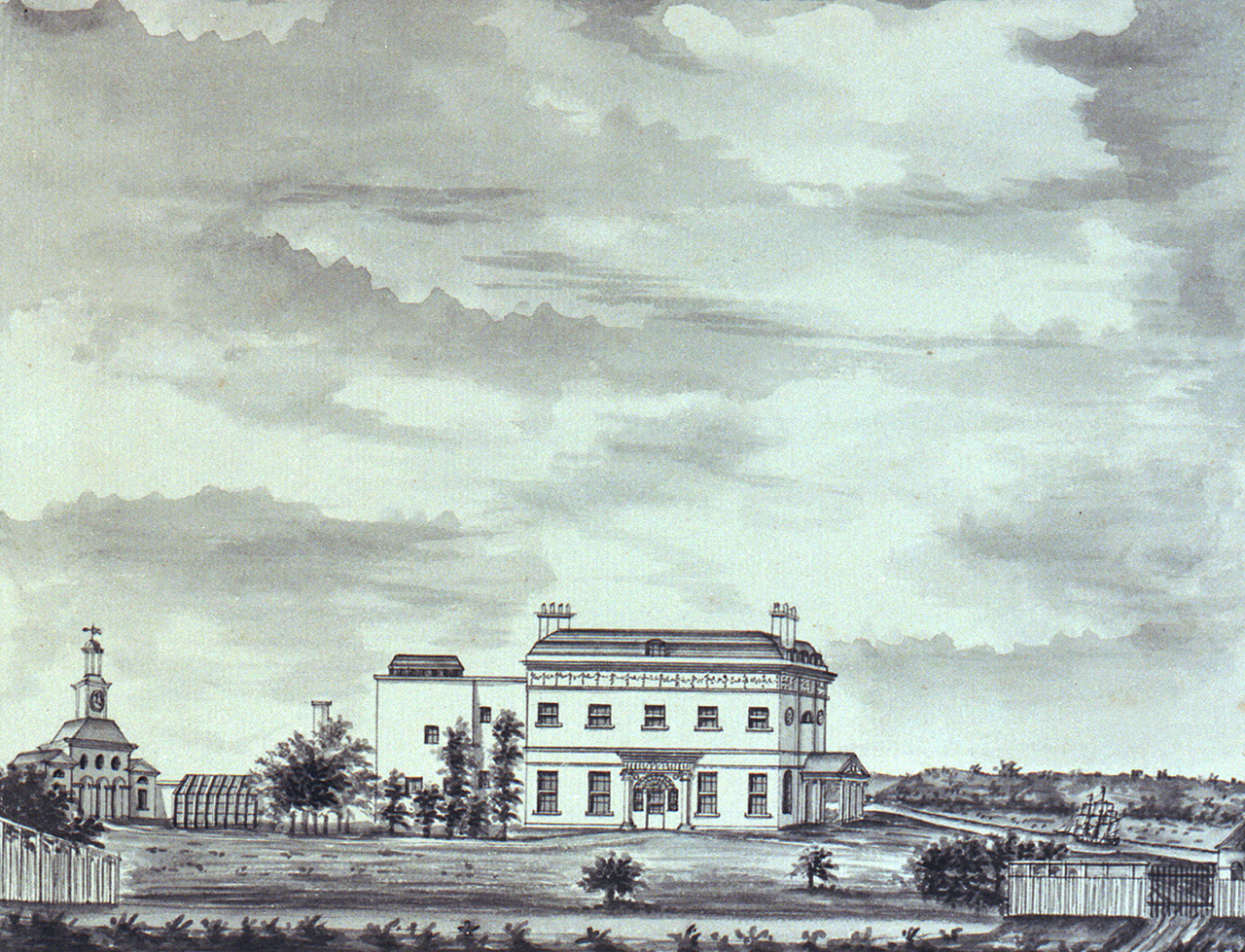
View of Woodlands House by John Charnock 1780s

It was described in Daniel Lysons' The Environs of London (1796):

"Woodlands, the seat of John Julius Angerstein, Esq. (between East Combe and West Combe), occupies a situation uncommonly beautiful. The surrounding scenery is very picturesque; and the distant view of the river, and the Essex shore, is broken with good effect by the plantations near the house. The grounds were laid out, and the house built about the year 1772, by the present proprietor, who has a small but valuable collection of pictures; among which Sir Joshua Reynolds's celebrated portrait of Garrick between Tragedy and Comedy, the Venus, a well known picture, by the same artist; a fine portrait of Rubens, by Vandyke; and a very beautiful landscape, with cattle, by Cuyp, claim particular notice. The greenhouse is to be remarked for its collection of heaths."

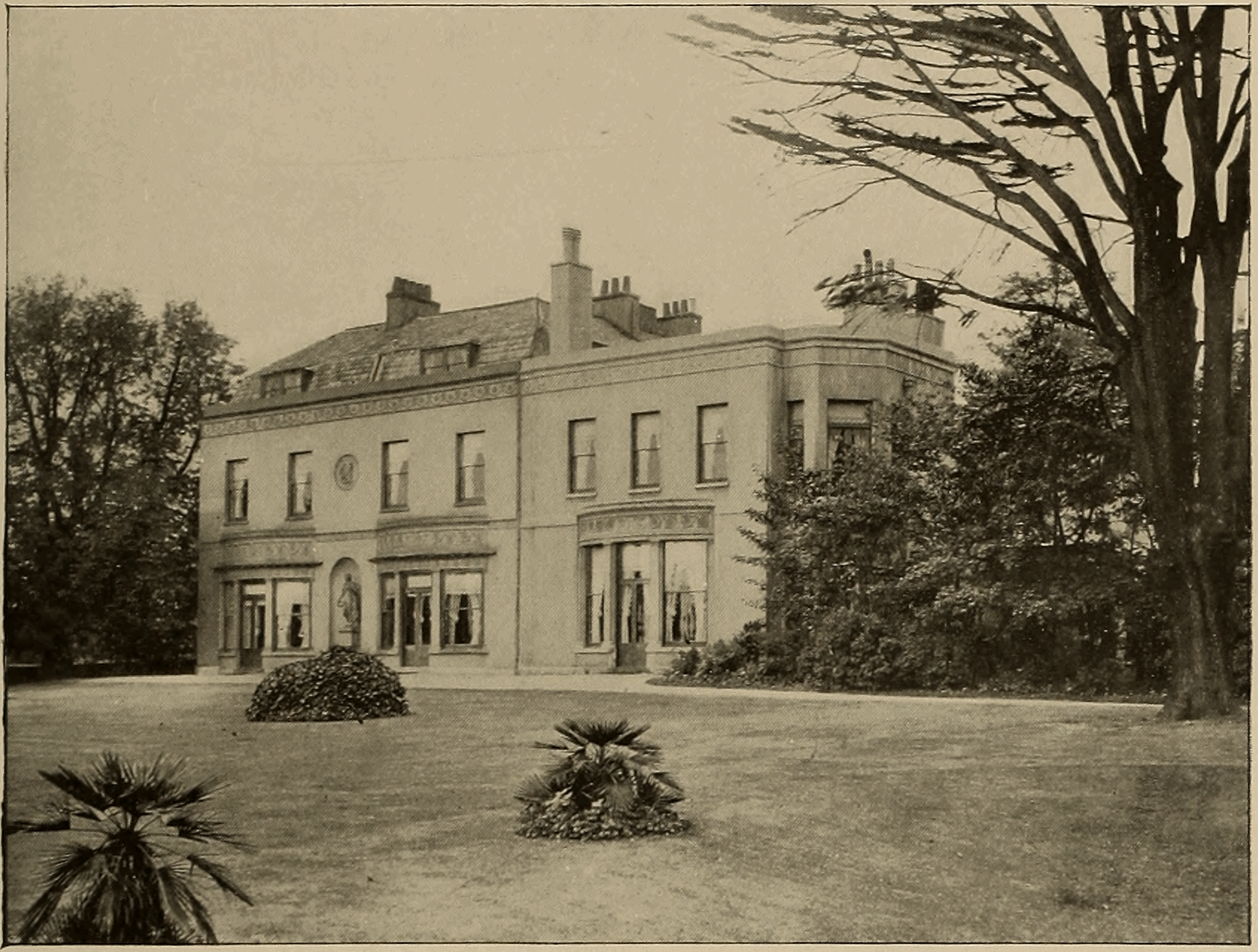
This photo of Woodlands House appeared in the November 1897 edition of Cassier's Magazine as part of an article about Alfred Yarrow.

Angerstein extended Woodlands in the late 18th century, adding a west wing, conservatory, out-buildings and a stable and riding school (most of these were demolished after the sale of the Westcombe estates in 1876). After Angerstein's death in 1823, the property became the family home of his son John Angerstein (who was elected Liberal MP for Greenwich in 1835 and devoted much of his time to development of the Angerstein estates).

In the late 1890s, the property was purchased by the shipbuilder Sir Alfred Fernandez Yarrow. It became the Yarrow family home and later, during the First World War, served as a hostel for Belgian refugees. In the 1920s, it was sold to a Catholic religious order, the Little Sisters of the Assumption, for use as a convent and novitiate; during the 1930s, an adjacent building (today Mycenae House) was constructed to expand the novitiate accommodation. The convent operated as part of the wider Assumptionist community centred around Our Lady of Grace Church and Highcombe House on Charlton Road, approximately 0.6 miles (0.97 km) east of Woodlands House.

== Woodlands Art Gallery ==
Acquired by the Royal Borough of Greenwich in 1967 after the Little Sisters relocated to Paddington, the house opened as a local history library and contemporary art gallery — known as Woodlands Art Gallery — in 1972. It held an extensive range of solo and group exhibitions.

In October 2003, the local history library was moved to a new site on the Royal Arsenal site in Woolwich – later the Greenwich Heritage Centre – and the gallery subsequently closed.

== Steiner School ==
The council sought proposals to redevelop Woodlands House, the adjacent Mycenae House and surrounding grounds, with a proposal incorporating premises for a local Steiner School being approved in July 2006.
