= William Yolland =

English military surveyor, astronomer, and engineer (1810–1885)

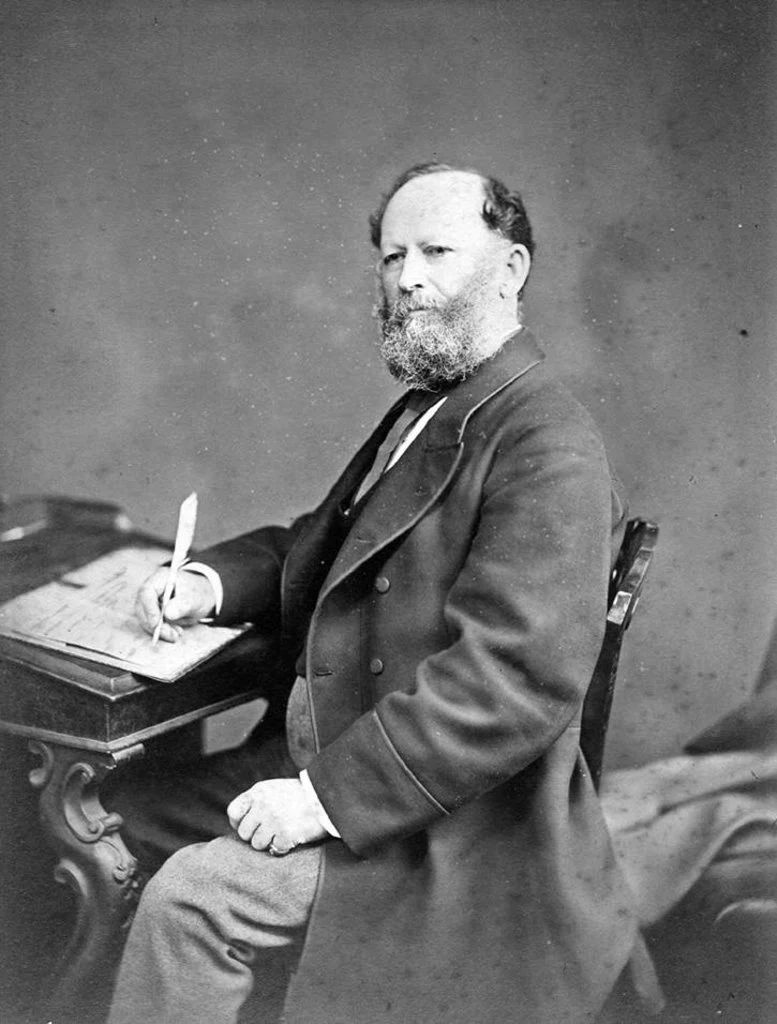
William Yolland, the Royal Society commemorative portrait

William Yolland CB, FRS FRSA (17 March 1810 – 4 September 1885) was an English military surveyor, astronomer and engineer, and was Britain's Chief Inspector of Railways from 1877 until his death. He was a redoubtable campaigner for railway safety, often in the face of strong opposition, at a time when railway investment was being directed towards the expansion of the networks rather than the prevention of accidents. He was a member of the three-man committee of inquiry into the Tay Bridge disaster. He held the rank of lieutenant colonel.

== Career ==
Yolland was born in Plympton St Mary, Devon, the son of the land agent to Lord Morley, Plymouth. He was educated at Trueman's mathematical school at Exeter. He was commissioned into the Royal Engineers in 1828 and completed his technical training at the Royal School of Military Engineering in Chatham, Kent, in 1831.

=== Ordnance Survey ===
After army service in Britain, Ireland and Canada he was posted to the Ordnance Survey in 1838. He made a strong impression there, particularly with his mathematical knowledge and publications on astronomy, and in 1846 he was nominated to head the organisation by its departing Superintendent, General Thomas Colby. He was, however, thought too young for the post and an older officer (a sapper who had no survey experience) was appointed instead. This new Superintendent, Colonel Lewis Hall, despatched Yolland back to Ireland to avoid his embarrassment in commanding a more qualified officer, but the survey there was of greater importance than Hall had realised: Parliament had noticed that revenue was being lost as land assessments for tax were not up to date and Yolland's progress there was followed with interest. In 1849, he was called to appear before a parliamentary select committee to explain how his method of mapping settlements in Ireland could be applied in England, as more detailed town maps were urgently needed to assist in the planned reforms of town sanitation. The interest in Yolland's work in Ireland survives to this day: as a young man he appears as a leading character in Brian Friel's play Translations, a modern play set in nineteenth century Co. Donegal. The character of Yolland in Translations is fictionalised, however, as he is called George Yolland and is missing, possibly dead, at the play's end. General Colby appears as "Captain Lancey". Yolland's technical account of establishing a triangulation base near Lough Foyle (1827-9) was incorporated as the "Geodesy" section of the Royal Military Academy's curriculum for the training of military engineers.

On his return to England he was placed in charge of the Ordnance Survey's new offices in Southampton, where he produced a set of maps of the City itself; in 1852, with Captain Tucker of the Royal Engineers, he completed a plan of the city of York.

In 1851, Yolland was appointed to one of the judging panels for The Great Exhibition, serving with Colonel Hall in the military engineering category.

When Colonel Hall retired in 1854 it was expected that, at the second opportunity, Yolland would be offered the Superintendent's post. However Hall, who had continued to resent his subordinate's abilities, succeeded in blocking the appointment. Yolland left the Ordnance Survey immediately afterwards. The Railway Inspectorate of the Board of Trade was invariably staffed from the Royal Engineers and Yolland, although still an army officer (by then a major) had no difficulty in securing a post with that organisation. Additionally, he was appointed to a commission to report on the best methods of scientific and technical training for military officers. The commission's report included the recommendation that entry to the Royal Engineers, and the other scientific branches of the Army, should be by competitive examination and no longer by patronage. His findings were accepted and his report was still influencing the training of military engineers in Britain and the United States at the end of the twentieth century.

=== Railway Inspectorate ===
Yolland retired from the army in 1863, with the rank of lieutenant-colonel, although he retained his position with the Railway Inspectorate. At a time when Britain's railway mileage was expanding at a great rate, his duties included the inspection of new lines and he took full opportunity to insist that the latest safety features, such as signal interlocking and block working, should be deployed. Yolland's campaign for continuous automatic brakes (he favoured the spring-and-ratchet system invented by James Newall) was initially less successful. (Note: Newall, based in Bury, Lancashire, was carriage builder to the Lancashire and Yorkshire Railway. He also was patentee for a gas-fuelled carriage lighting system.) At that time the Inspectorate had no statutory powers with regard to existing lines; (Note: The Railway Inspectorate was not granted this enforcement power until 1889, with the passing of the Regulation of Railways Act of that year.) all too frequently Yolland found himself reporting, in his characteristic rigorous manner, the organisational failures and neglect that had led to serious accidents.

In 1877 he was appointed HM Chief Railway Inspector in succession to Henry Whatley Tyler. He died on 4 September 1885 in Atherstone, Warwickshire.

==== Shipton-on-Cherwell accident (1874) ====
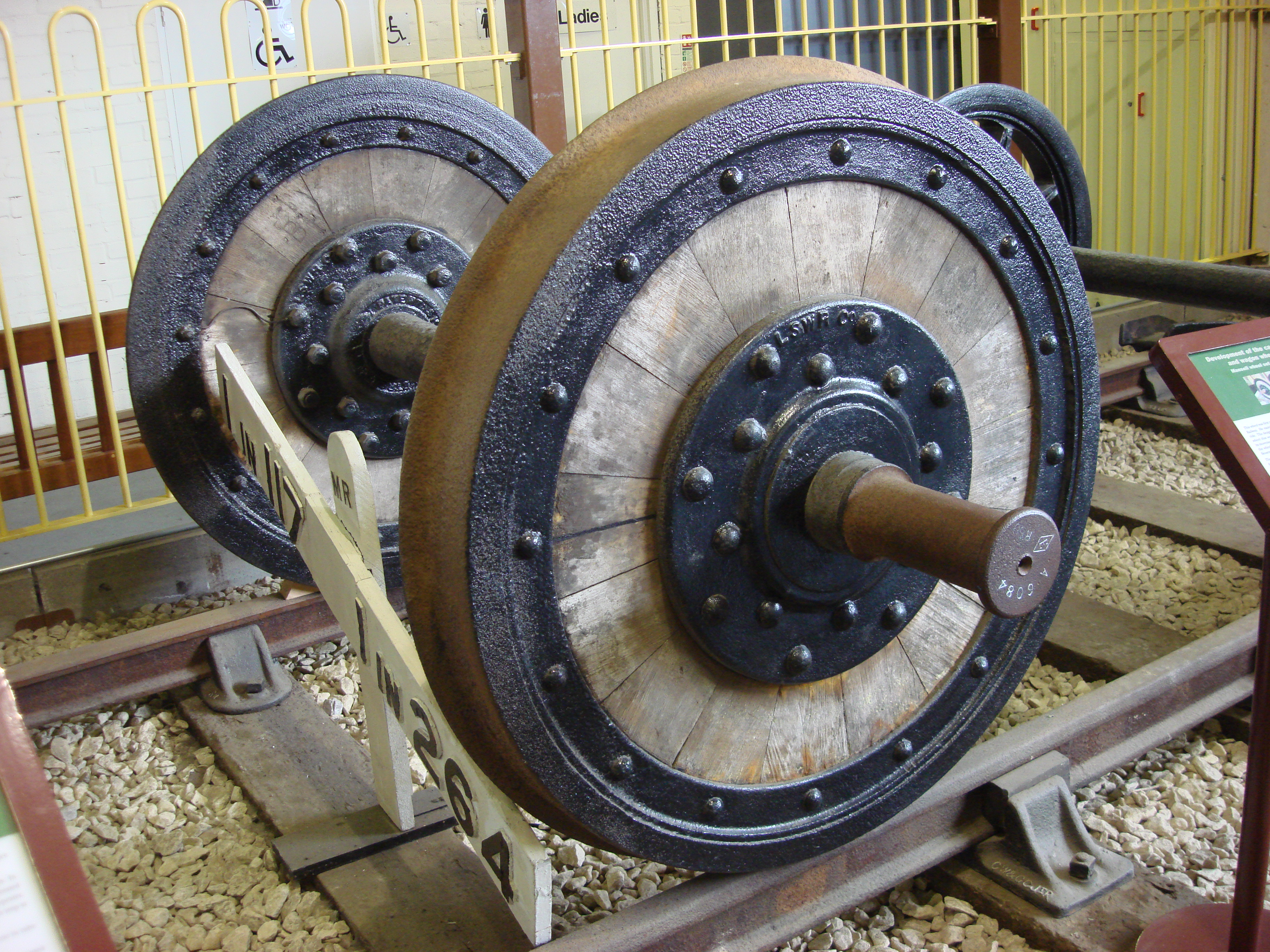
Yolland urged the universal introduction of the safer Mansell wheel (above) instead of the riveted-tyre wheel, the cause of this accident

One of the worst railway crashes he investigated occurred on the Great Western Railway near Oxford. The accident occurred on 24 December 1874 at Shipton-on-Cherwell, just north of Kidlington when a passenger train was derailed and crashed down the embankment. The investigation led by Yolland established the root causes very quickly, and further details emerged at the public enquiry set up by the Board of Trade. By tracing the marks on the sleepers behind the derailed train, Yolland established that the small 4 wheel carriage behind the locomotive had suffered a broken wheel rim, which disintegrated and caused the derailment. The driver braked hard and the carriages behind cannonaded into the 4 wheeler, crushing it entirely, as well as themselves running off the track. The accident occurred near to a small bridge crossing the Oxford canal and 34 passengers died from their injuries.

==== Tay bridge disaster (1879) ====
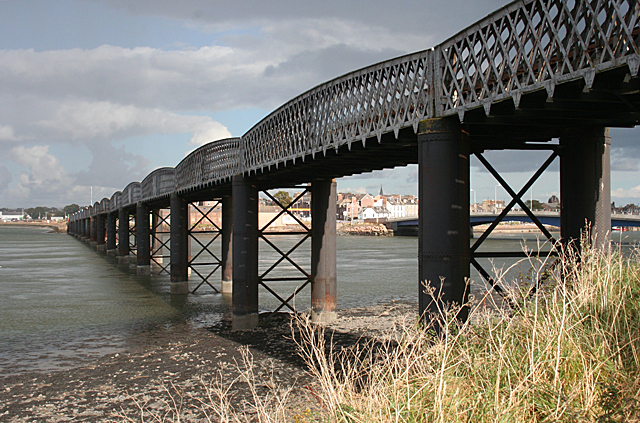
The replacement South Esk Viaduct, constructed at Yolland's insistence following the Tay Bridge disaster

He was a member of the Board of Inquiry into the Tay Bridge disaster, with fellow members Henry Cadogan Rothery and William Henry Barlow. A train was lost on the night of 28 December 1879 while crossing the Tay estuary just south of Dundee. The centre section of the 2-mile-long bridge collapsed during a storm, with the loss of all on board the train. The inquiry sat initially in Dundee to hear eyewitness accounts of the accident, and then in London for expert evidence. They produced their final report in June 1880, and concluded that the bridge was "badly designed, badly built and badly maintained". Yolland went on to report on the state of other bridges designed by Thomas Bouch, especially a very similar structure at Montrose, the South Esk Viaduct. Yolland found that the viaduct was in such a dire state, with the piers not perpendicular, that it failed under test and needed to be demolished and replaced by a more stable double-track structure. The directors of the owning company, the North British Railway, did not "feel free to adopt this suggestion" and the Board of Trade allowed the company to build a less expensive replacement, retaining their narrower and less stable single-track design.

== Honours and awards ==
- Fellow of the Royal Astronomical Society 1840
- Fellow of the Royal Society 1859
- Fellow of the Royal Society of Arts 1860
- Companion of the Order of the Bath 1881
