= Mycenae House =

Community centre in London, England

Coordinates: 51.4797°N 0.0158°E

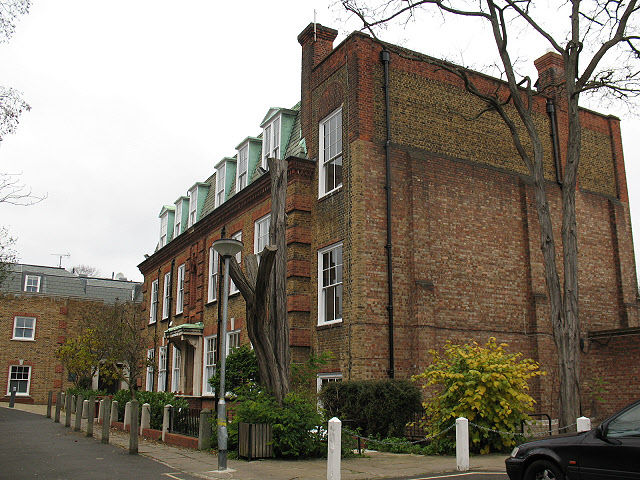
- Interactive map of the Mycenae House area

Website
- mycenaehouse.co.uk

Mycenae House is a community centre housed in a former convent building adjacent to the Georgian villa, Woodlands House, in Mycenae Road, in the Westcombe Park area of Greenwich, London. The adjacent Mycenae Gardens are a public open space and are also used for community events.

== History ==
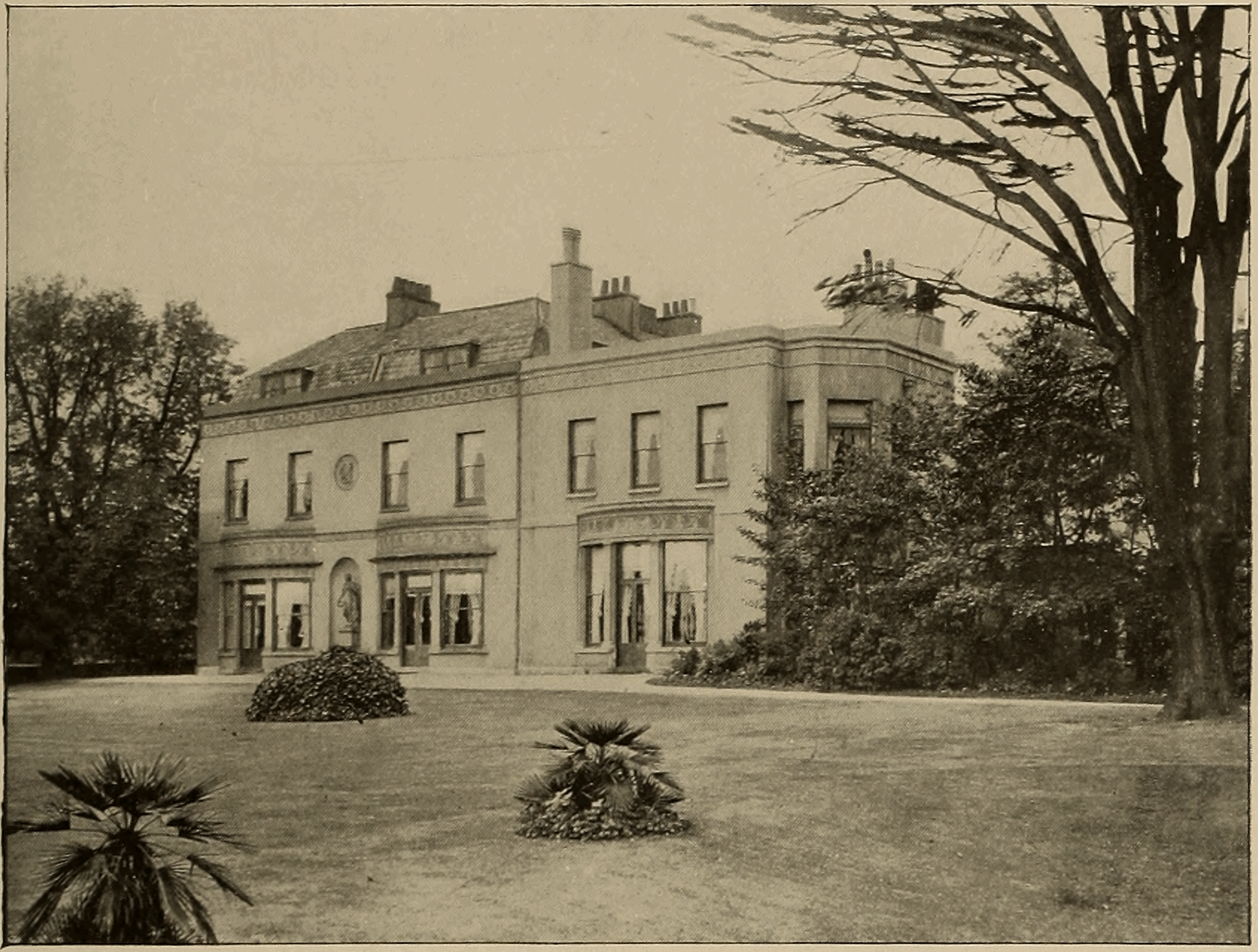
Looking across Mycenae Gardens, this photo of Woodlands House appeared in the November 1897 edition of Cassier's Magazine. Mycenae House was constructed some 35 years later to the right (west) of Woodlands.

Woodlands House and surrounding land was acquired by a Catholic novitiate order, the Little Sisters of the Assumption, after the end of the First World War. Proceeds from the sale of part of the land were used to fund construction of a novitiate house, which opened in 1933.

After the Little Sisters of the Assumption moved to Paddington in 1967, the properties and grounds were purchased by the London Borough of Greenwich. The novitiate house became a community centre, known then as Kidbrooke House (taking its name from a public building demolished during the construction of a large roundabout—the Sun in the Sands—forming the junction of Shooters Hill Road and the A102 Blackwall Tunnel southern approach road). In 1994, management of the building passed to the Vanbrugh Community Association, and the building was renamed Mycenae House.

During the early 2000s, Greenwich Council sought fresh finance to maintain both Woodlands and Mycenae House. Woodlands and a strip of land in the south and southwest corner of the grounds were leased in 2007 on a long lease to the Greenwich Steiner School. Development of a block of flats on the land provided funds for the lease purchase and renovation of Woodlands.

Today, Mycenae House is used for events, including concerts and political hustings, for educational activities (music classes, for example), and as a meeting place for various clubs and societies - for example, the Blackheath Scientific Society, Charlton Chess Club, the Woodcraft Folk, and the Woolwich Photographic Society.

== Mycenae Gardens and The Dell ==
The buildings' gardens, Mycenae Gardens, along with an adjacent space (The Dell), are a public open space, owned and maintained by the Royal Borough of Greenwich.

The Gardens are described as a "secluded gardens consisting of grass areas and small copse of trees," with the open space also used for events by local organisations such as the Westcombe Society and by the Steiner School. They are accessed via the main entrance to the Woodlands and Mycenae House.

The Dell, situated to the north of the Gardens, is accessed directly from Mycenae Road or via a gate on the footpath between Mycenae Road and Beaconsfield Road. There is no direct access between Mycenae Gardens and the Dell. The Dell has a natural character, and is overgrown with brambles, with London Plane trees covered by ivy; it is primarily used by dog walkers.
