= Recoleta (Charlottesville, Virginia) =

Historic house in Virginia, United States

- U.S. National Register of Historic Places
- Virginia Landmarks Register
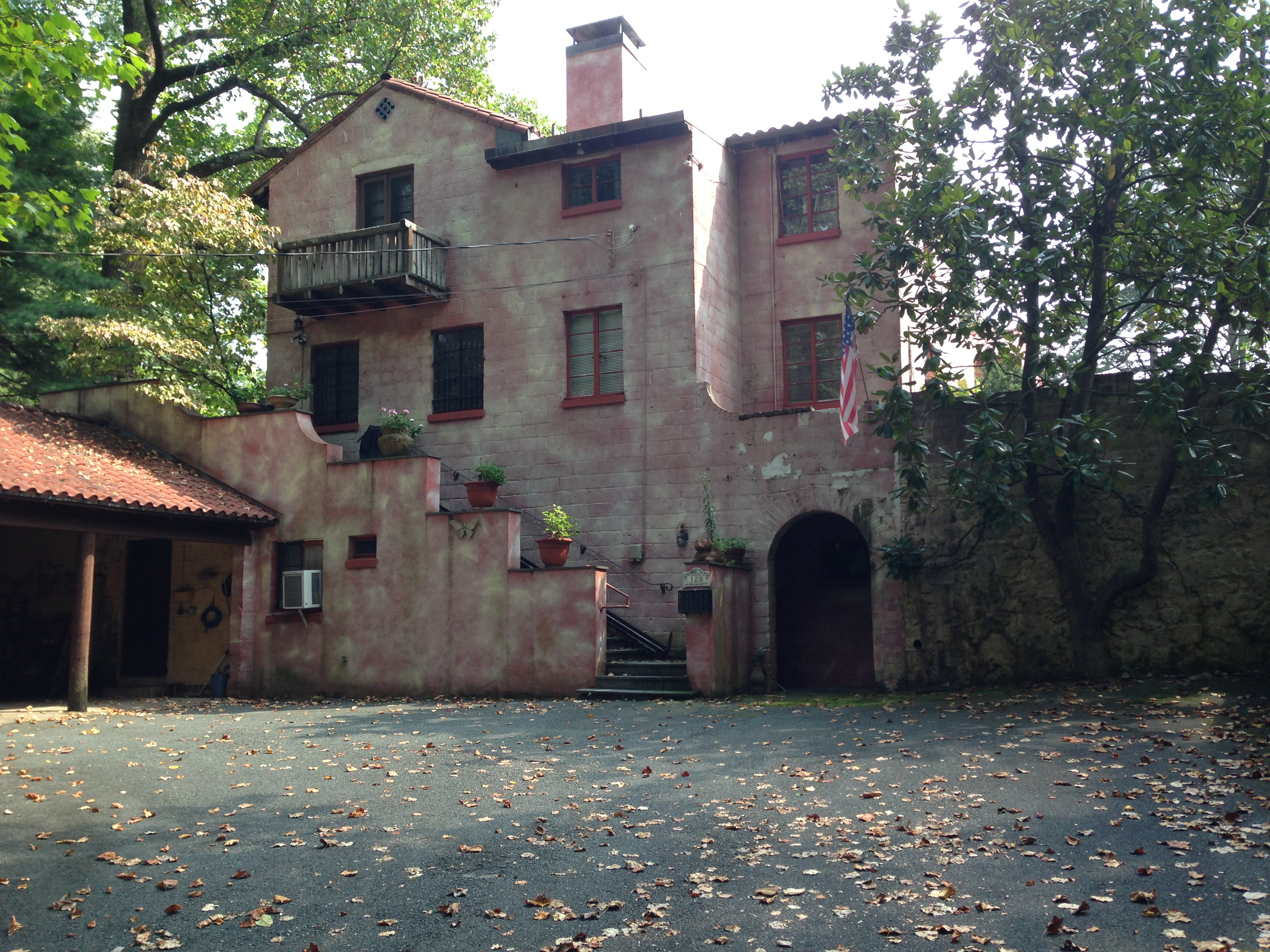
- Recoleta, September 2013

- Location within Virginia Location within the United States
- Location: 120 Rothery Rd., Charlottesville, Virginia
- Coordinates: 38°2′23″N 78°30′35″W
- Area: 1 acre (0.40 ha)
- Built: 1940
- Architect: Rothery, Agnes Edwards; et al.
- Architectural style: Mission/spanish Revival
- NRHP reference No.: 04000858
- VLR No.: 104-5086

Significant dates
- Added to NRHP: August 11, 2004
- Designated VLR: September 10, 2003

Recoleta, also known as Rothery, is a historic home located at Charlottesville, Virginia. It was built in 1940, and is a multi-story Spanish Colonial Revival style dwelling with a central courtyard. The house is constructed of cinder block, painted for a stucco effect, a red tile gable roof, arched openings, an exterior stair, a balcony, and steel-framed casement windows. The courtyard is enclosed by a loggia with a garden front. Also on the property is a contributing garden enclosed by a cinder block wall built in 1946 that incorporates a fountain wall with a tile roof, circular lantern niches, and a patio.

The dwelling also includes a Norwegian-style fireplace and other Scandinavian design elements, inspired by the travels of University of Virginia music professor Harry Rogers Pratt and his wife, Agnes Edwards Rothery who built the house. The couple worked with Charlottesville architect Benjamin Charles Baker, who had been part of the prominent gilded age firm, McKim, Mead and White. The use of durable materials like cinder block reflects the couple's interest in creating a low-maintenance dwelling that could accommodate tenants.

So the floors downstairs were of native soapstone which would never have to be polished: the ceilings were of wood--beamed downstairs, solid upstairs--which would not have to be plastered. The thick walls did not need to be plastered or papered or panelled inside, but their surface would be frankly revealed through a light-colored wash. It was fire-proof. termite-proof, age and weather and tenant-proof.

Recoleta was listed on the National Register of Historic Places in 2004. It was purchased by the University of Virginia in 2015.
