= Highcombe House =

Grade II listed Regency villa in Charlton, London, England

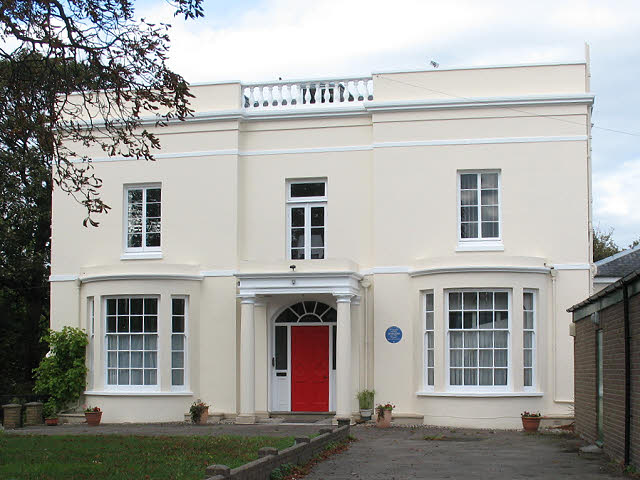
- Highcombe House, Charlton, London

General information
- Type: House, former residence, presbytery, community centre
- Architectural style: Regency
- Location: 145 Charlton Road, Charlton, London, SE7 7EZ
- Coordinates: 51°28′48″N 0°01′38″E
- Completed: c. 1825

Technical details
- Floor count: 4

Design and construction
- Designations: Grade II listed building Heritage at Risk Register (2025)

Highcombe House (historically spelled as "High Combe") is a Grade II listed Regency villa located at 145 Charlton Road in Charlton, London, built around 1825. The building was added to Historic England's Heritage at Risk Register in 2025 due to concerns about its condition and future. It stands as one of only two surviving structures (the other is Woodlands House) from the historic Westcombe and Eastcombe estates that once stood between Greenwich and Charlton Village. Adjacent to Our Lady of Grace Church, Highcombe House is now used as a presbytery and community centre.

== Heritage at Risk status ==
In 2025, Historic England placed Highcombe House on its Heritage at Risk Register, identifying the building as being at risk due to concerns about its maintenance, structural condition, and uncertain future. The Heritage at Risk designation recognises the building's significant architectural and historical importance whilst highlighting the urgent need for conservation action to secure its long-term preservation. The adjacent buildings and gardens behind the house are also included in this assessment as part of the wider heritage complex.

== History of the Eastcombe estate ==
The land on which Highcombe House stands was originally part of the broader Nethercombe/Eastcombe area. In 918 CE, Princess Aelfrida gifted this land to the Abbey of Ghent. The term "coombe" derives from the Old English "cumb," meaning a valley or hollow, reflecting the natural landscape that created Westcombe, Middlecombe and Eastcombe.

The location remained a religious owned farming area until 1537, when Henry VIII confiscated Nethercombe/Eastcombe and annexed it to the Manor of Old Court during the dissolution of the monasteries. The first manor house to be built along Charlton Road in 1710, by Captain William Saunderson known as "Clockhouse" (later renamed East Combe) in the vicinity of what is now Our Lady of Grace Church, London.

By the early 19th century, the original Eastcombe estate was divided and sold off. Around 1810, David Hunter converted the original Clockhouse into stables and offices and built another fine mansion nearby. In 1819, Eleanor Agnes, Dowager Countess of Buckinghamshire, purchased the Eastcombe estate and made it her residence until her death in 1851.

== Highcombe House in context: the three houses of the Eastcombe estate ==
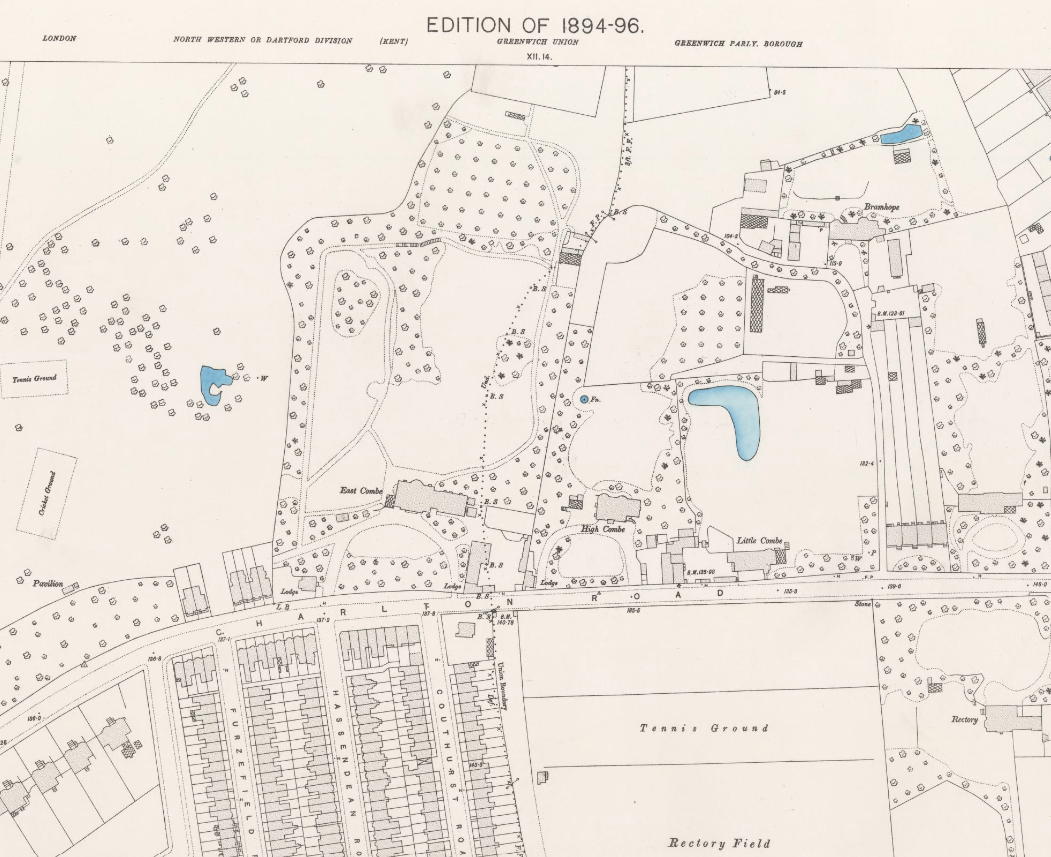
Eastcombe Estate in Charlton in 1893

Highcombe House was one of three substantial houses that once formed part of the historic Eastcombe Estate, as shown in the Ordnance Survey map from 1893. The other two significant residences were:

=== Clockhouse (later East Combe House 1), 1710–1810 ===
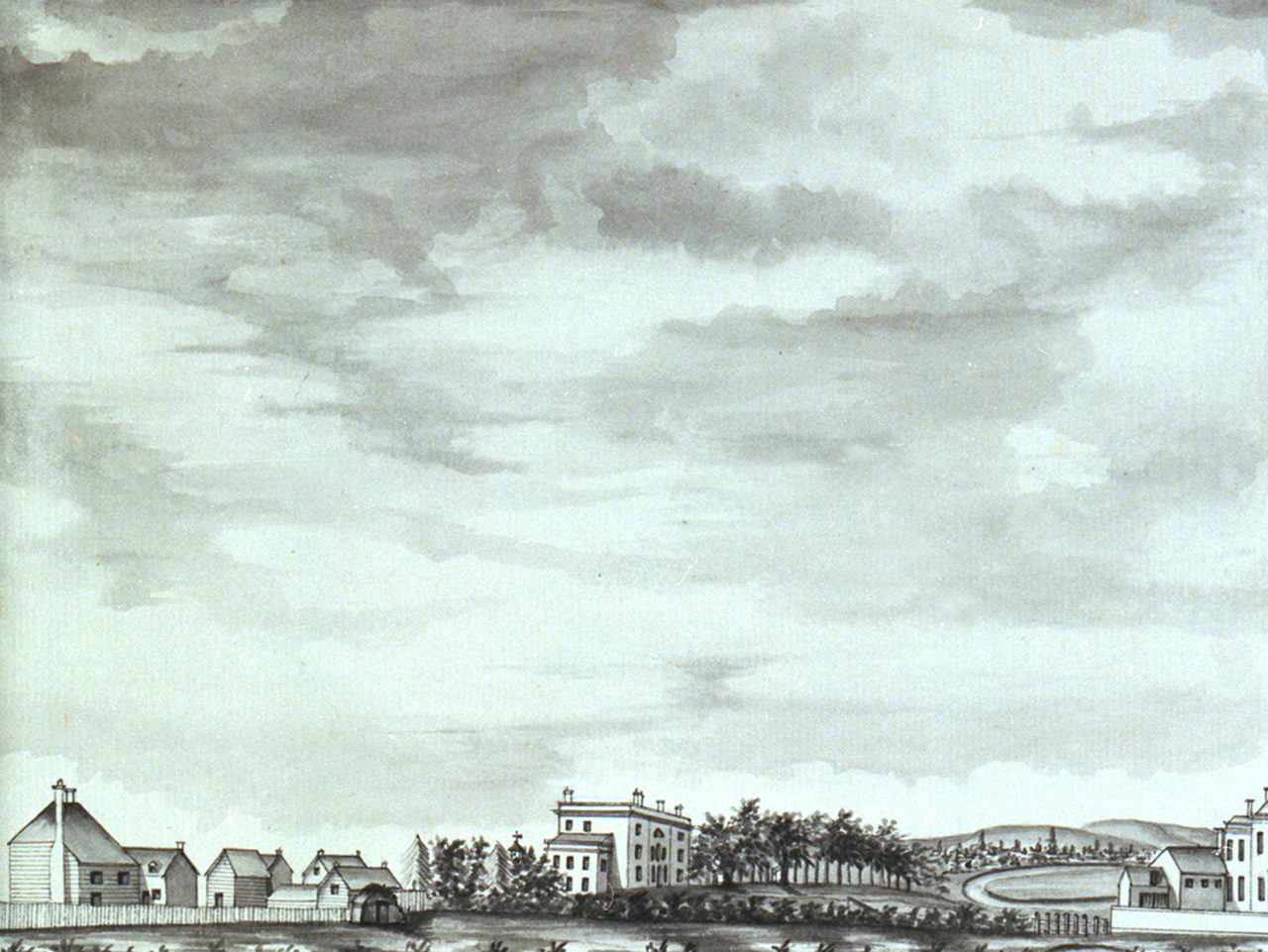
Eastcombe House 1 (Clockhouse), c.1780, the original mansion of the Eastcombe Estate built by Captain William Saunderson in 1710

Built in 1710 by Captain William Saunderson, a distinguished naval officer who commanded the HM Yacht William and Mary, which transported King William III and Mary II to Holland. Saunderson was knighted by George I in 1714.

Notable occupants included Lieutenant General Sir William Congreve, 1st Baronet (1780–1783 and c.1795–1805), who founded the gunpowder factory at Waltham Abbey, and John Hooke Campbell (1782–1795), Lord Lyon King of Arms, Scotland.

=== East Combe House 2, 1810–1904 ===
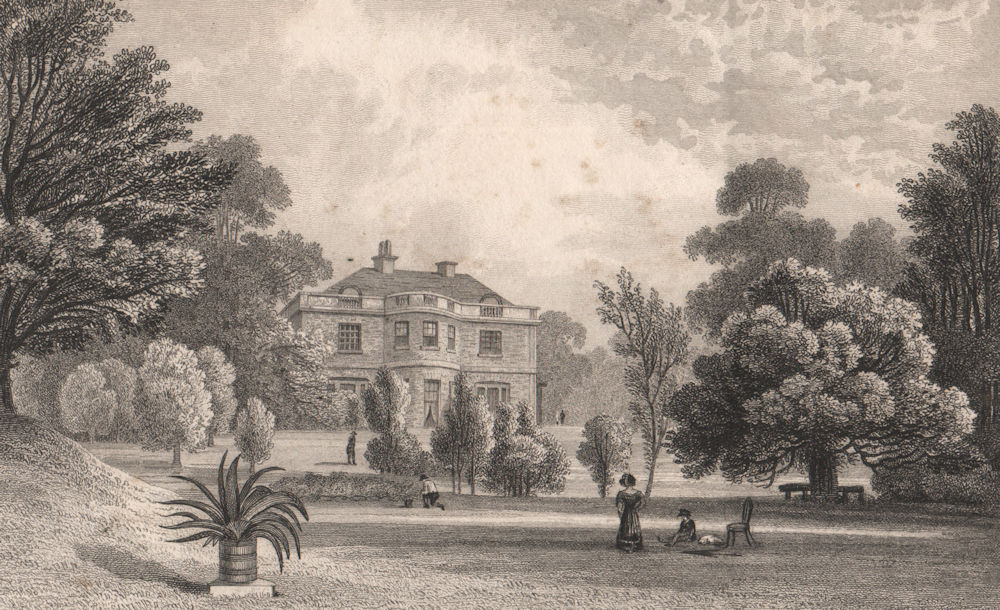
Eastcombe House 2, the elegant Georgian villa built by David Hunter around 1810 to replace the original Clockhouse mansion, later residence of the Countess of Buckinghamshire

Designed by George Tappen and built around 1810 for David Hunter, who converted the original Clockhouse into stables and offices, this new villa was located about 200 yards north-northwest from the old house.

Its most prestigious occupant was Eleanor Agnes, Countess of Buckinghamshire (1816–1851), widow of Robert Hobart, Colonial Secretary and namesake of Hobart, Tasmania.

=== Highcombe House ===
Built around 1825 in the fashionable Regency style, Highcombe House is now the one surviving structure in the historic Eastcombe Estate. Its construction likely coincided with the residency of Sir William Congreve, 2nd Baronet.

== Notable residents ==
=== Sir William Congreve, 2nd Baronet (c.1826–1828) ===
Sir William Congreve, 2nd Baronet (1772–1828) likely commissioned Highcombe House and was its first resident. He succeeded his father as head of the Laboratory at Woolwich and invented the Congreve rocket used at the Battle of Leipzig. He also served as an MP for Plymouth and was a friend of King George IV. The Congreve rocket inspired the phrase "the rockets' red glare" in "The Star-Spangled Banner".

=== Sir George Whitmore (c.1851–1862) ===
General Sir George Whitmore (1775–1862), Commandant of the Royal Military Academy at Woolwich, occupied Highcombe House from 1851 until his death in 1862.

=== William Henry Barlow (c.1865–1902) ===
William Henry Barlow (1812–1902) was an engineer who designed St. Pancras Station and the second Tay Bridge.

== Artwork associated with property ==
Among the family possessions at Highcombe House was a portrait of the Restoration dramatist William Congreve (1670–1729), first cousin twice removed of Sir William Congreve, 1st Baronet. This portrait by Godfrey Kneller is visible above the fireplace in Philip Reinagle's portrait of Mrs Congreve with her children (1782) painted in Clockhouse. The collection also included a portrait of Captain William Congreve with his son, and portraits of Thomas Congreve (1714–1777) and his wife (née Anna Catherine Handasyde). All three paintings are visible on the rear wall in the portrait of Mrs Congreve and her children. This painting reveals how the fashionable Georgian home was decorated with floral carpet, girandole mirrors and mantelpiece ornaments.

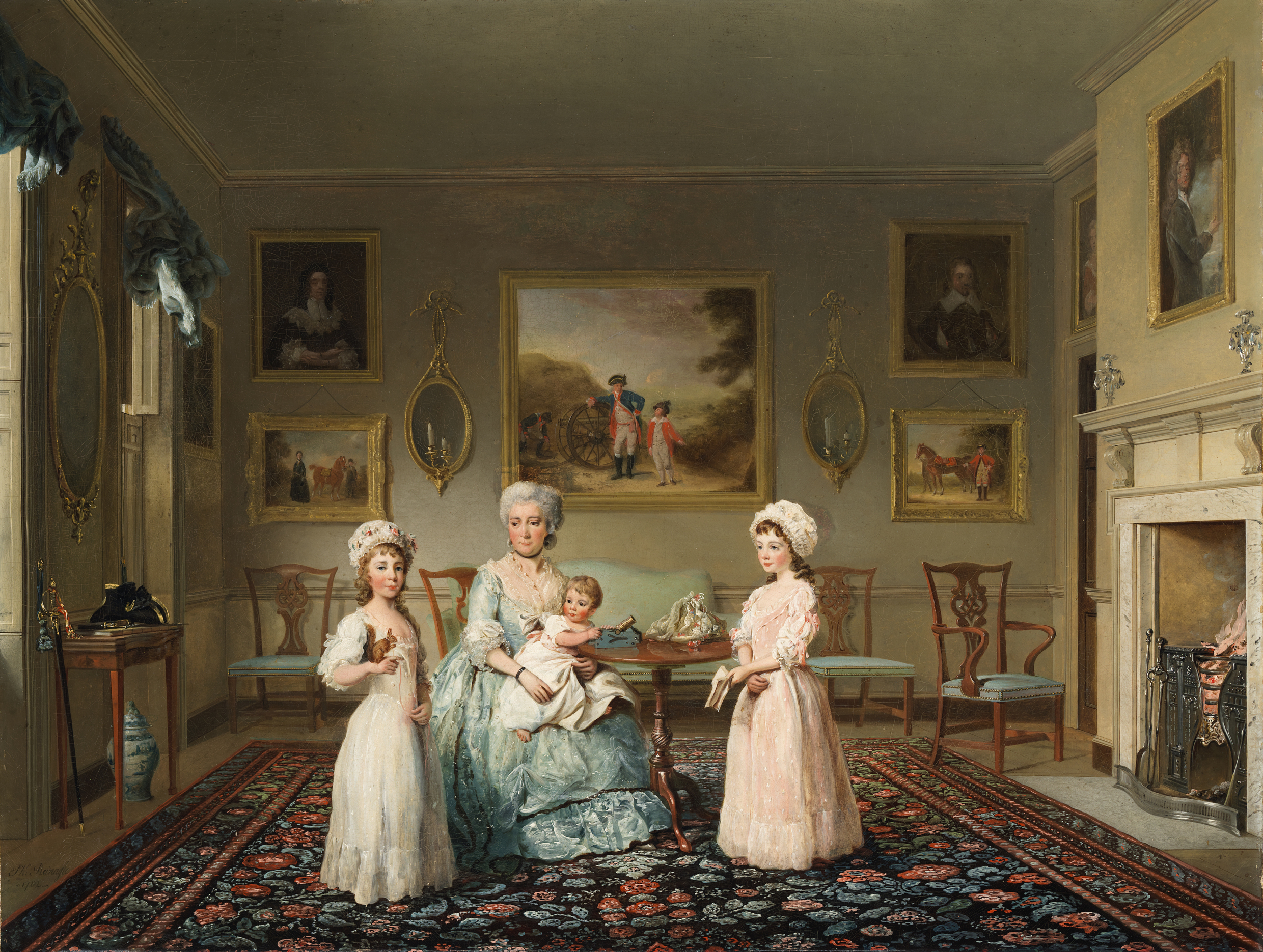
Reinagle Portrait of Mrs Congreve with her Children - set in Eastcombe House 1782

Mrs Rebecca Congreve is shown with her children, Ann, Thomas and Charlotte, in a drawing room thought to represent Eastcombe House, near Greenwich, where the family had moved in 1780. Over the mantelpiece is Godfrey Kneller's portrait of their illustrious ancestor, the playwright William Congreve. The survival of all the family portraits supports the authenticity of furnishings and their disposition in the room. Four of these portraits are now in the Gallery's possession, including the pair by Thomas Phillips that flank the larger one of Captain William Congreve with his elder son William, again by Reinagle. The captain was renowned for manoeuvring artillery across rough country and is shown leaning on an eight-pounder canon. Between the windows is his sword, his tricorne hat and a leather pouch for orders, while a toy cannon is on the central table. The squirrel and the book held by the girls, the floral carpet (Axminster or Aubusson) and the pair of girandole mirrors (to a Hepplewhite pattern) are the more feminine elements.

After years as Alan Ramsay's assistant, Reinagle turned against formal portraiture. He never recaptured the quality of his Congreve family groups in other interior scenes.

== Religious use and educational legacy (1903–present) ==
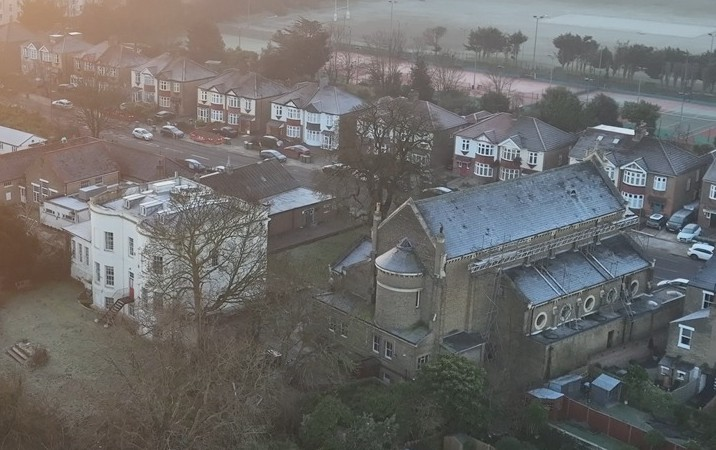
Our Lady of Grace Church and Highcombe House from the air

In 1903, Highcombe House was purchased for the Oblate Sisters of the Assumption, in coordination with the Augustinians of the Assumption and the Diocese of Southwark. Mass was first celebrated in the house on 18 July 1903 by Fr Benedict Caron, A.A.

In 1928, Our Lady of Grace Catholic Primary School was founded, which continues today. The Oblate Sisters of the Assumption operated the parish and school in its early years, alongside the Augustinians of the Assumption, who had been involved from 1903. The Augustinians administered the parish until 1989, when pastoral care passed to diocesan clergy.

Between 1925 and 1927, the church and grounds were further enhanced with the construction of the community hall, coinciding with the purchase of Woodlands House for use as a convent, expanding the religious community's presence in the area. Woodlands House, a Grade II* property built by John Julius Angerstein, is one of the two surviving Georgian properties from the original grand houses of the area documented in the John Charnock survey. In 1938 Littlecombe was purchased to extend the school further, this building was previously the residence of Charlotte Maryon Wilson from 1876 to 1895.

Highcombe House is now used as a presbytery and community centre. The building is designated as Grade II listed by Historic England, recognising its architectural and historical significance as the "Presbytery to East of Church of Our Lady of Grace".

== Architecture ==
=== Exterior ===
Highcombe House exemplifies Regency architecture with its distinctive white-painted stucco exterior. The building features:

- A symmetrical façade with an elegant curved design
- Four stories including basement and attic levels
- Pairs of rounded bay windows creating a double-bowed appearance
- A central entrance with original double doors and fanlight
- A slate roof set behind a decorative parapet

=== Interior ===
The interior retains several period features, including ornate ceiling roses, decorative cornices, and marble fireplaces

== Cultural, environmental and historical context ==
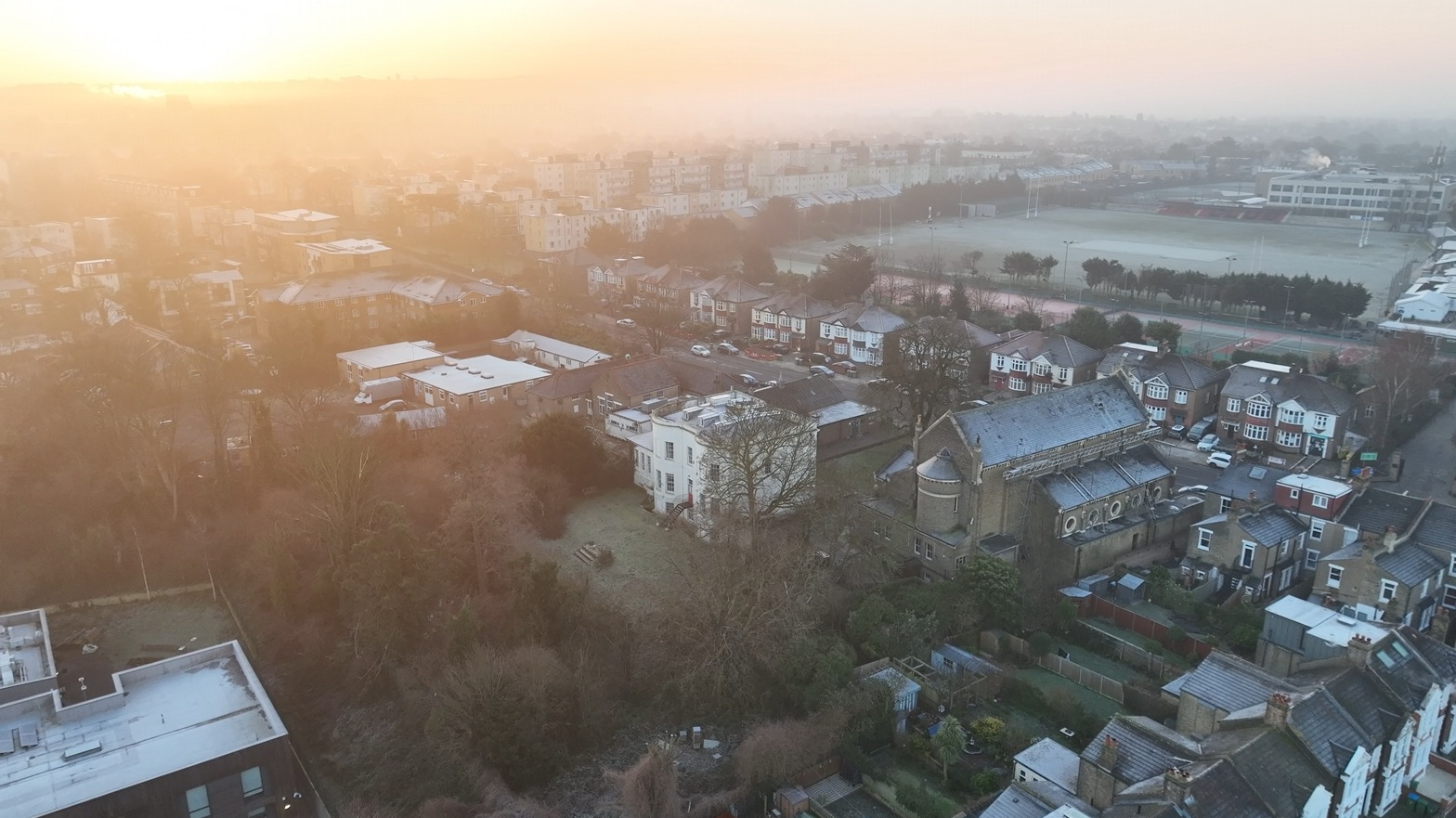
Aerial view of Highcombe House and Our Lady of Grace Church at sunrise, showing the historic Eastcombe Estate area in its modern suburban context, winter 2025

The property's evolution mirrors the wider transformation of Charlton from rural retreat to suburban district. By the turn of the 20th century, the entire "Eastcombe estate was developed by various house builders," with Highcombe House and Woodlands House standing as the two remaining examples of the earlier grand residences.

Woodlands House and Highcombe House have justified heritage listing individually. Together they also share further significance, as the two surviving prestigious residences from the farmland area between Greenwich and Charlton made up of the historic Westcombe, Middlecombe and Eastcombe estates. These are the last remaining buildings from the nine grand properties originally drawn by John Charnock in his architectural survey of the area in the late 18th century.
