= William Henry Barlow =

British civil engineer (1812–1902)

William Henry Barlow FRS FRSE FICE MIMechE
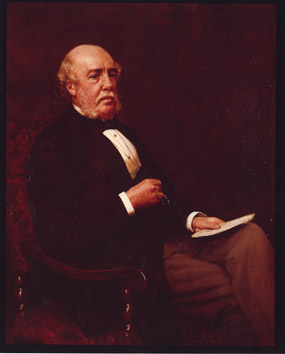
- Barlow by John Collier, 1880
- Born: 10 May 1812; Woolwich, Kent, U.K.
- Died: 12 November 1902 (aged 90); Charlton, London, U.K.
- Parent: Peter Barlow
- Engineering career
- Discipline: Civil
- Institutions: Institution of Civil Engineers (president), Royal Society, Royal Society of Edinburgh
- Projects: St Pancras railway station, Clifton Suspension Bridge, Tay Rail Bridge
- Significant design: Barlow rail

William Henry Barlow (10 May 1812 – 12 November 1902) was an English civil engineer of the 19th century, particularly associated with railway engineering projects. Barlow was involved in many engineering enterprises. He was engineer for the Midland Railway on its London extension and designed the company's London terminus at St Pancras.

With John Hawkshaw, he completed Isambard Kingdom Brunel's Clifton Suspension Bridge. Following the Tay Bridge disaster he sat on the commission which investigated the causes and designed the replacement Tay Bridge. Barlow was also an inventor and experimenter, patenting a design for a rail and carrying out investigations on the use and design of steel structures.

== Early life and education ==
Barlow was born on 10 May 1812 in Woolwich, Kent (now in south-east London), the son of mathematician and physicist Professor Peter Barlow, who taught at the Royal Military Academy in Woolwich. William Barlow was the younger brother of Peter William Barlow. After a private education, Barlow began to study civil engineering with his father at the age of sixteen. After a year he, went on to a pupillage at the machinery department of the Royal Navy's Woolwich Dockyard close to his family home. He then worked at the London Docks for Henry Robinson Palmer.

Barlow married Selina Crawford Caffin in May 1842 at Charlton, Kent. The couple had four sons and two daughters. Their son Crawford Barlow became a civil engineer and was in practice with his father.

== Career ==
From 1832 he spent six years working as an engineer in Constantinople, Ottoman Empire, helping build an ordnance factory on behalf of machine tool manufacturers Maudslay, Sons & Field. He also produced a report for the Turkish government on lighthouses in the Bosphorus, which led to his first two scientific papers. (Note: Barlow's first papers were Experiments made at Constantinople on Drummond's light (1836) and The adaptation of different modes of illuminating lighthouses as depending on their situations and the object contemplated in their erection (1837).) For his services to the Ottoman government he was awarded the Order of Nishan Iftikhar (Order of Glory).

Barlow returned to Britain in 1838 to take up a post as assistant engineer on the Manchester and Birmingham Railway working for George W. Buck. In 1842, he joined the Midland Counties Railway as resident engineer for the section between Rugby and Derby. When the Midland Counties Railway became part of the Midland Railway in 1844, he retained the position, later becoming chief engineer of the larger railway. On 1 April 1845, Barlow was elected a member of the Institution of Civil Engineers and on 6 June 1850 he was elected a Fellow of the Royal Society.

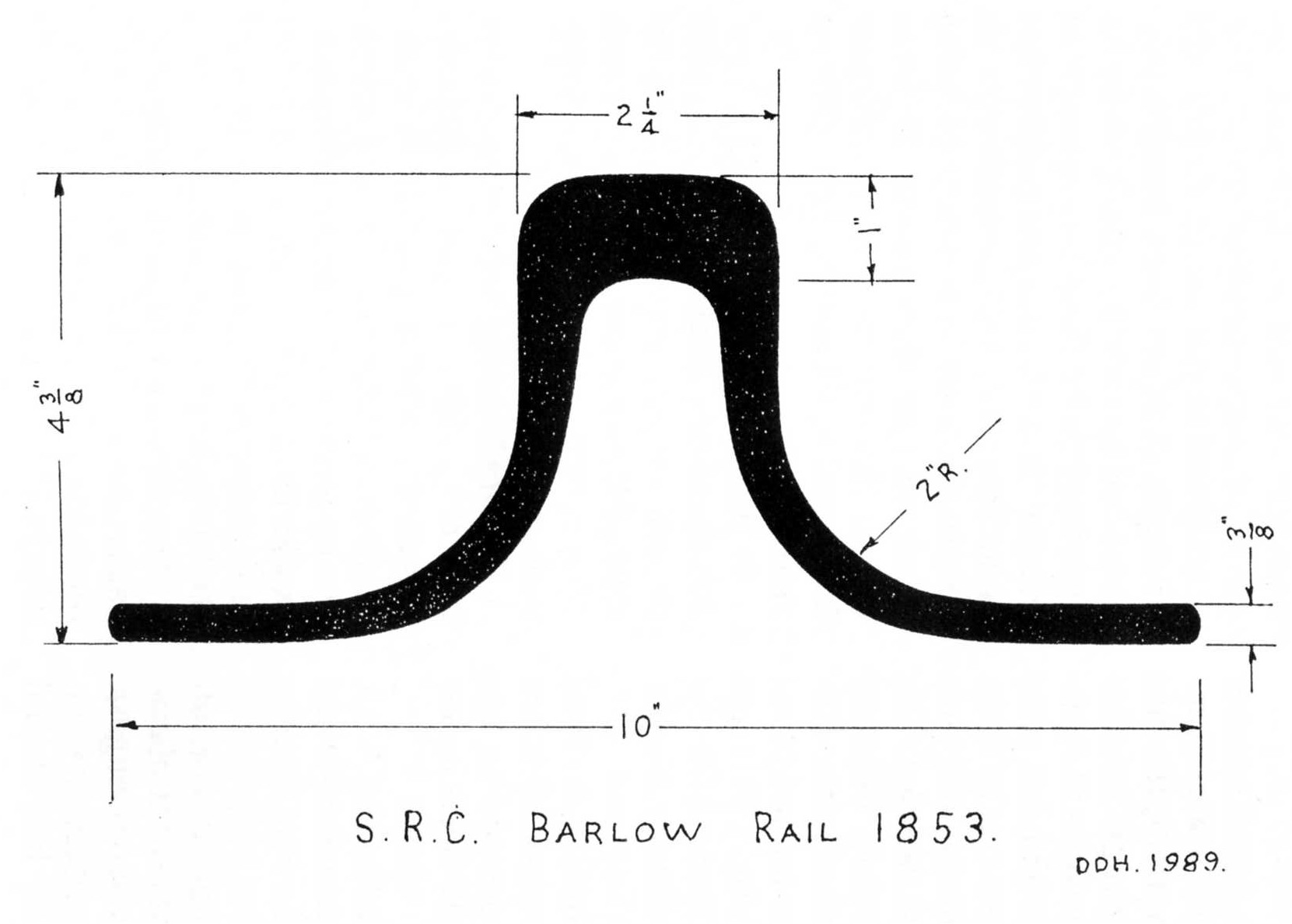
Cross section of Barlow rail

Whilst working on the Midland Railway's main line, Barlow established that the replacement of sleepers was a larger part of the cost of track maintenance than the replacement of rails because the sleepers decayed more quickly than the rails wore-out and needed renewal more often. To remove the cost of providing and replacing sleepers, he developed and patented his own rail design in 1849. It had a wide flanged profile which could be laid directly on to track ballast without the need for sleepers, with just periodic tie-bars to maintain the correct gauge. (Note: Barlow's patent for the rail was no. 12438, 1849.) Known as the Barlow rail, it was widely used, especially by the Great Western Railway.

Joseph Paxton, designer of the cast iron and glass Crystal Palace for The Great Exhibition of 1851, was a director of the Midland Railway and he asked Barlow for his help in the preparation of the structural calculations for the frame of the building.

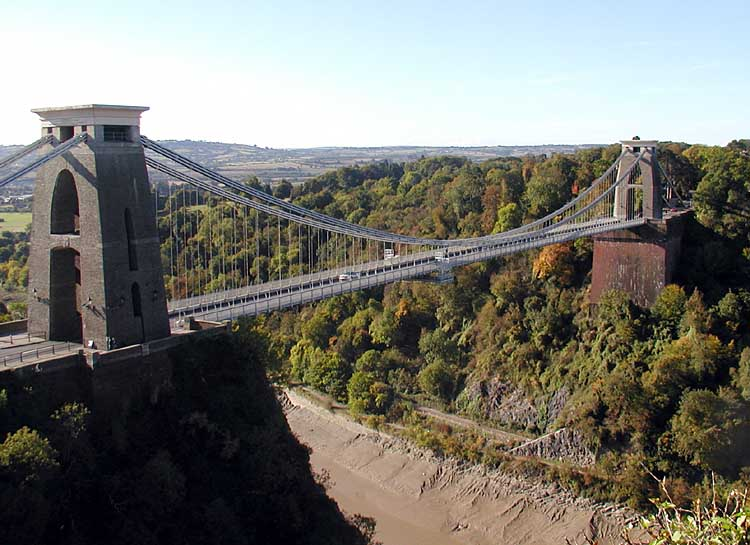
Clifton Suspension Bridge

In 1857, Barlow left the Midland Railway to form his own consultant engineering practice in London, with the Midland Railway as a significant client. Following the death of Isambard Kingdom Brunel in 1859, Barlow was commissioned with John Hawkshaw to complete the Clifton Suspension Bridge, Bristol, construction of which had been stalled since 1843 due to insufficient funds to finish it. Reusing the chains from Brunel's earlier Hungerford Suspension Bridge in London, demolished in 1860, Barlow and Hawkshaw completed the bridge in 1864 with a more robust deck than Brunel had planned and other variations caused by the reuse of the existing chains. Its 702-foot (214 m) span was the longest in Britain at the time.

Between 1862 and 1869, Barlow was consultant engineer for the Midland Railway's southern extension from Bedford to London, including the layout of the London terminus station at St Pancras on Euston Road. To deal with the sloping site and the need to cross the Regent's Canal a short distance to the north, the platforms were constructed on a raised structure supported on cast iron columns and girders. Under this structure, storage was laid out for beer from the breweries at Burton upon Trent. With assistance from Rowland Mason Ordish, Barlow also designed the arched, cast iron station canopy which spans 240 feet (73 m) across the platforms without intermediate support – then the widest of its kind in the world. It was designed as a cost-effective and efficient means of avoiding the need for additional solid structure in the lower level. George Gilbert Scott designed the hotel in front of the train shed.

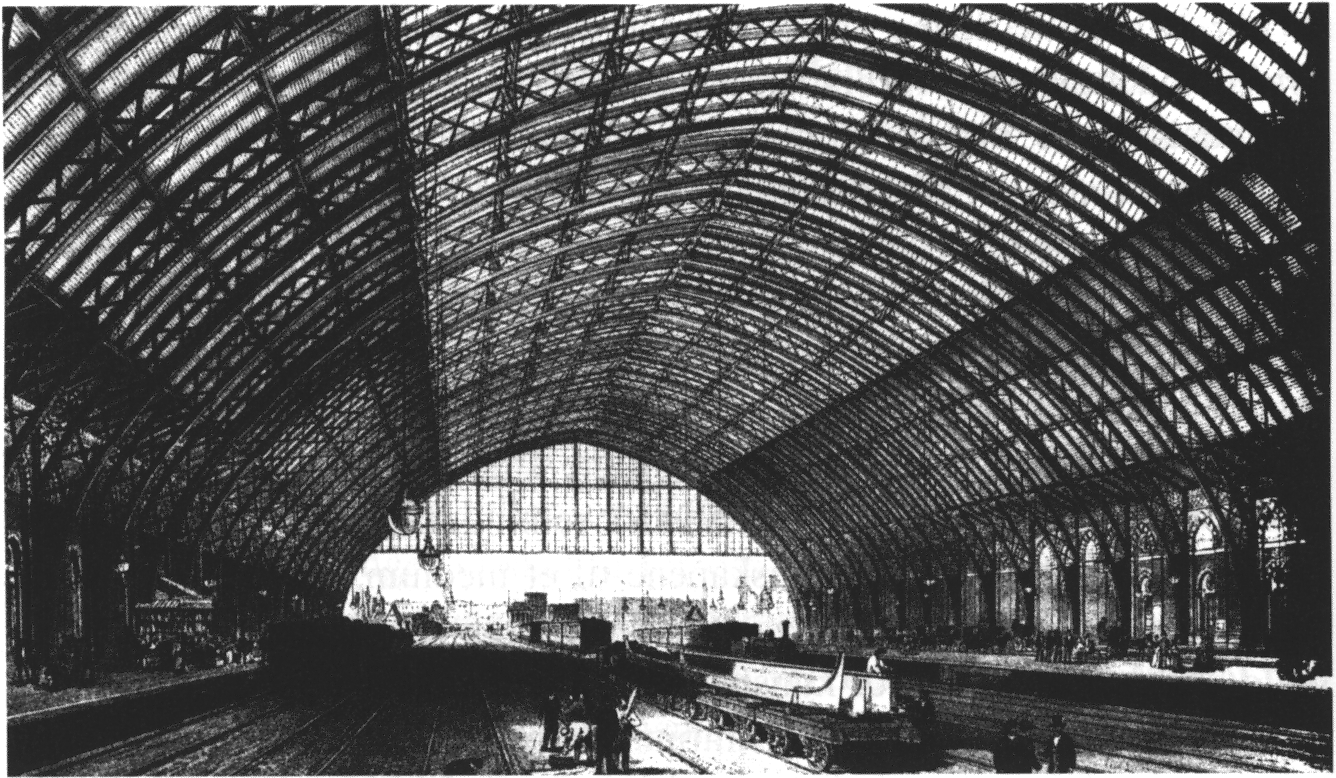
Interior, circa 1870

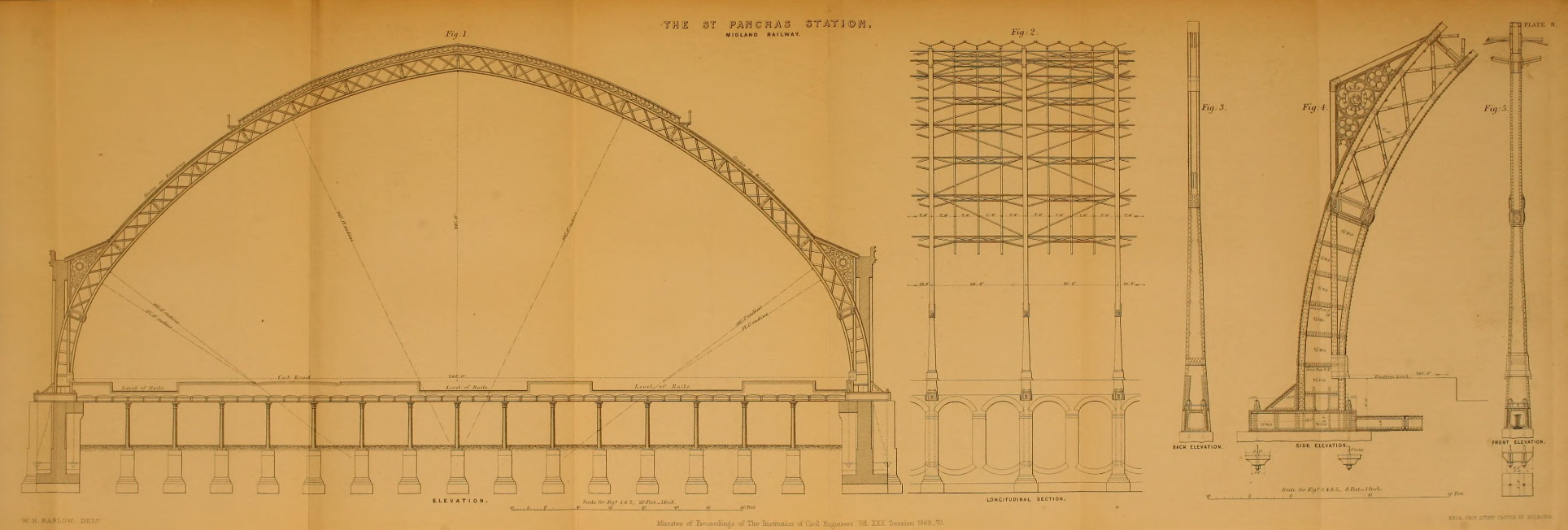
Engineering diagram

St Pancras station roof

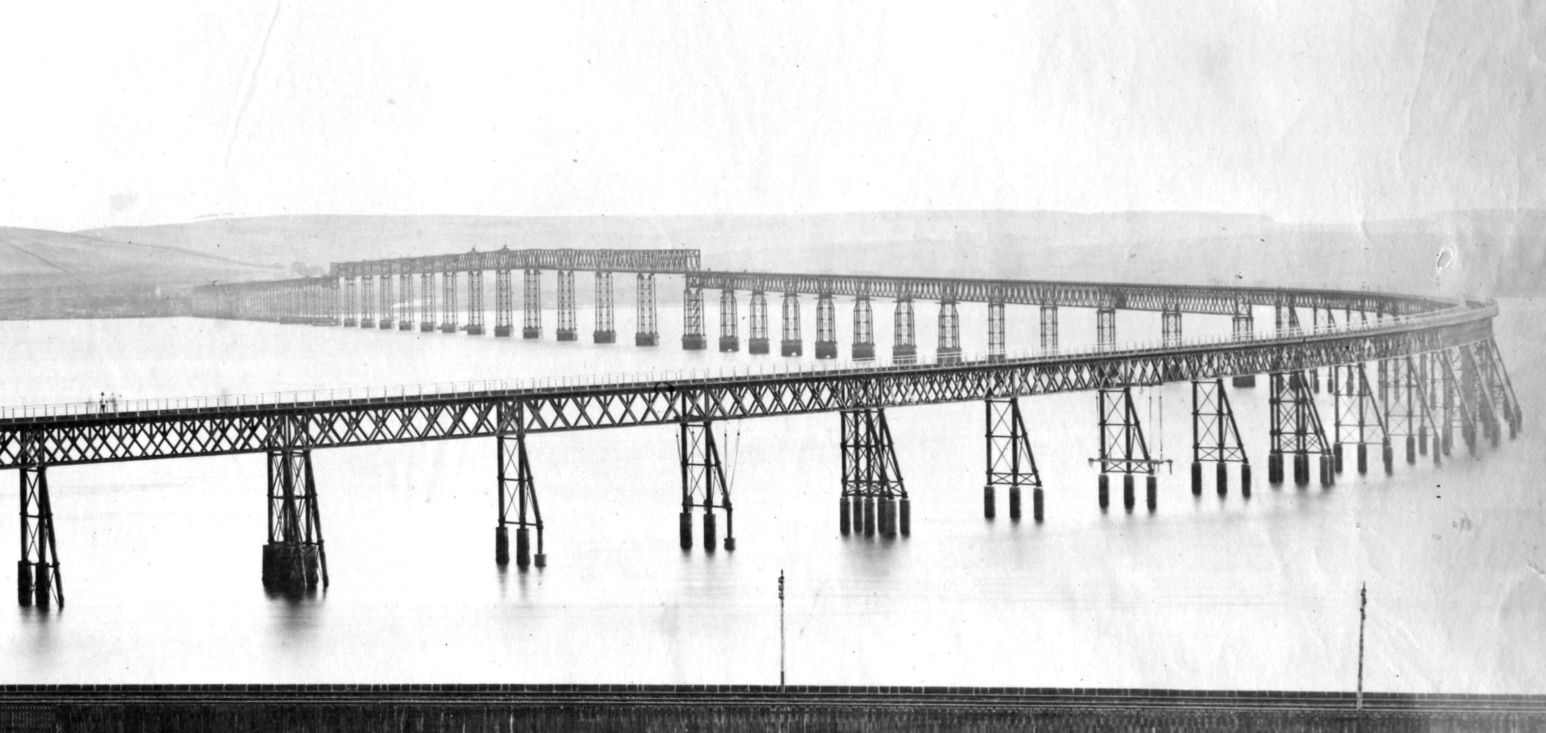
Thomas Bouch's original Tay Bridge. The higher, central section collapsed entirely in a December 1879 storm.

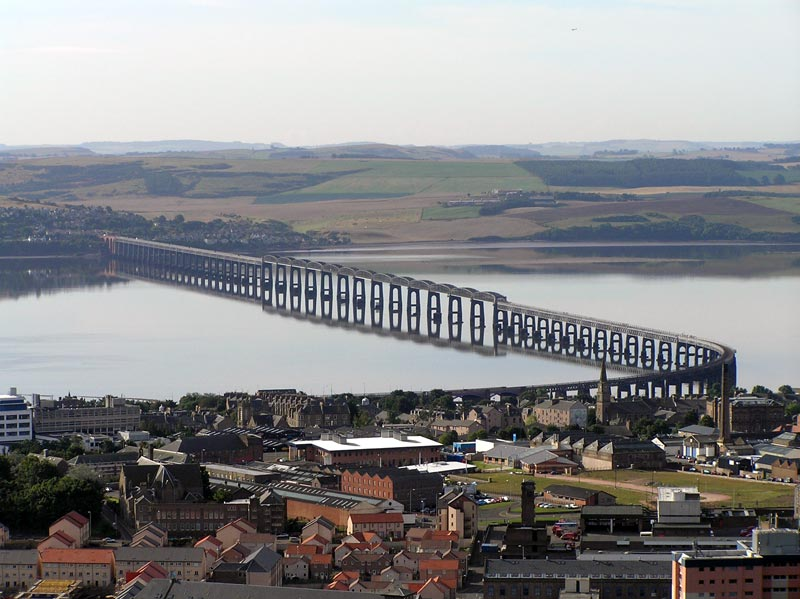
Barlow's replacement bridge

On 28 December 1879, the central section of the North British Railway's bridge across the River Tay near Dundee collapsed in the Tay Bridge disaster as an express train crossed it in a heavy storm. All 75 passengers and crew on the train were killed. As the newly elected President of the Institution of Civil Engineers, (Note: Barlow was elected president of the Institution of Civil Engineers on 23 December 1879, five days before the disaster.) Barlow was appointed as a member of the Board of Trade's Court of Inquiry into the disaster. He sat with Henry Cadogan Rothery and William Yolland, co-authoring one of the final reports with Yolland recommending a commission be established to examine wind loads on bridges. In its report dated 30 June 1880, the Court of Inquiry concluded that the bridge, designed by Sir Thomas Bouch and opened only the year before its collapse, had been "badly designed, badly built and badly maintained". The entire central box truss section of the bridge known as the "High Girders" collapsed along with the thirteen trestles supporting it, leaving a gap of nearly half-a-mile in the 2-mile-long (3.2 km) bridge.

His reputation destroyed, Bouch died in October 1880. Work on the suspension bridge he had designed to cross the Firth of Forth was stopped after the Tay Bridge collapse and Barlow, Sir John Fowler and Thomas Elliot Harrison, consultant engineers for the three railway companies involved in the construction, were asked to choose a replacement design. The solution was the cantilevered Forth Bridge by Fowler and Sir Benjamin Baker.

In 1881 Barlow sat as member of the Wind Pressure (Railway Structures) Commission established at the recommendation of the Tay Bridge report. He led the design of the replacement Tay Bridge (1882–87) with his son Crawford Barlow as engineer. The new design used large monocoque piers to support a double railway track. The old brick and masonry piers from the first bridge were retained as breakwaters for the new piers upstream. They can still be seen today as a forlorn reminder of the tragedy of 1879.

Barlow was an early experimenter with civil engineering uses for steel, carrying out research at Woolwich Arsenal in the 1850s and being a member of the Institution of Civil Engineers' committee on the subject. From 1873 he was a member of a Board of Trade committee which produced the first recommendations on safe working loads for steel in railway structures in 1877.

Barlow also experimented with sound recording. In February 1874 he presented the Royal Society with a talk On the Pneumatic Action which accompanies the Articulation of Sounds by the Human Voice, as exhibited by a Recording Instrument. He called his 'recording instrument' a Logograph.

Barlow was a Fellow of the Royal Society of Edinburgh, a member of the Institution of Mechanical Engineers and the Society of Arts. He served as Vice President of the Royal Society in 1881 and was an honorary member of the Société des Ingénieurs Civil de France. He was also a Lieutenant-Colonel in the Railway Volunteer Staff Corps.

With his health failing, he retired from practice in 1896, along with his son. He died on 12 November 1902 from exhaustion after breaking his leg, and was buried in Charlton Cemetery in a plot adjacent to that of his father's grave. His home "High Combe", Charlton Road, Greenwich, is marked with a blue plaque.

== Notes and references ==
=== Bibliography ===
- Barlow, William Henry (1850). "On the Construction of the Permanent Way of Railways: With An Account of the Wrought-Iron Permanent Way Laid Down on the Main Line of the Midland Railway". Excerpt Minutes of the Proceedings of the Institution of Civil Engineers. Institution of Civil Engineers. hdl:2027/mdp.39015021048007.
- Barlow, William Henry (1867). "Description of the Clifton Suspension Bridge". Minutes of the Proceedings of the Institution of Civil Engineers. XXVI. Institution of Civil Engineers: 243–257. doi:10.1680/imotp.1867.23161.
- Barlow, William Henry (1870). "Description of the St Pancras Station and Roof, Midland Railway". Minutes of the Proceedings of the Institution of Civil Engineers. XXX. Institution of Civil Engineers: 78–105. doi:10.1680/imotp.1870.23014.
- Barlow, William Henry (1874). "On the Pneumatic Action which accompanies the Articulation of Sounds by the Human Voice, as exhibited by a Recording Instrument". Proceedings of the Royal Society of London. XXII. Royal Society. Archived from the original on 15 October 2012.
- Bramwell, Frederick (1884). "The practical applications of electricity: a series of lectures delivered at the Institution of Civil Engineers, session 1882–83". Institution of Civil Engineers: 28. "The practical applications of electricity."
- Chrimes, Mike (2008). "Barlow, William Henry (1812–1902)". Oxford Dictionary of National Biography (online ed.). Oxford University Press. doi:10.1093/ref:odnb/30598. (Subscription, Wikipedia Library access or UK public library membership required.)
- Hawkshaw, John; Armstrong, W G; Barlow, W H; Stokes, G G; Yolland, W (1881). "Wind Pressure (Railway Structures) Commission" (PDF). Her Majesty's Stationery Office.
- Rothery, Henry (1880). "Report of the Court of Inquiry and Report of Mr Rothery Upon the Circumstances attending the Fall of a Portion of the Tay Bridge on the 28th December 1879" (PDF). Her Majesty's Stationery Office.
- Preece, William Henry (1878). "The Phonograph". Journal of the Society of Arts. XXVI.
- "Barlow, William Henry". Who Was Who. Oxford University Press/A & C Black. December 2007.

Professional and academic associations
Preceded by John Frederick Bateman	President of the Institution of Civil Engineers; December 1879 – December 1880	Succeeded by James Abernethy
