= Agnes Rothery =

American writer (1887–1954)

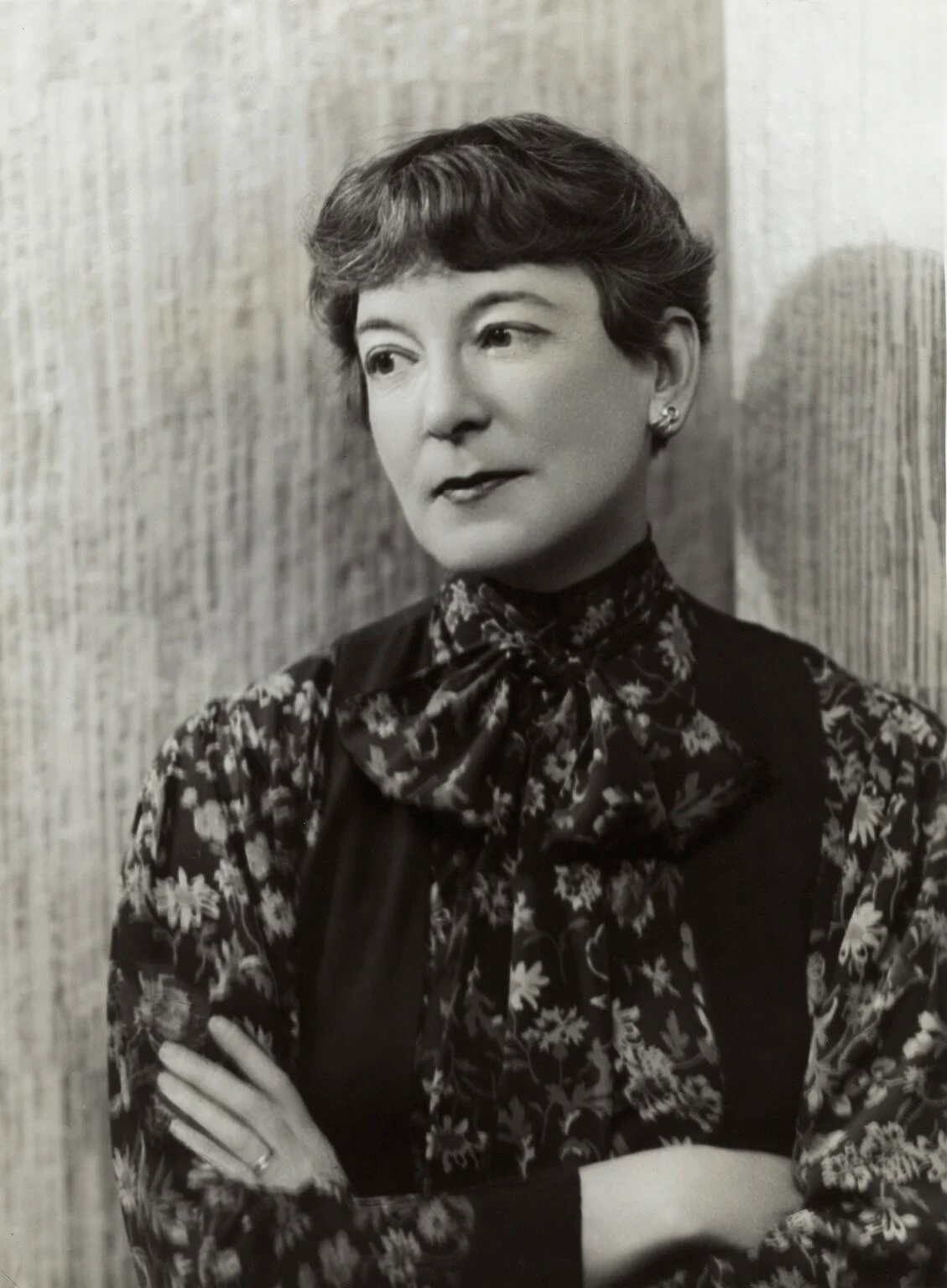
- Agnes Rothery (1936)
- Born: Agnes Edwards Rothery; January 31, 1887; Brookline, Massachusetts, United States
- Died: August 11, 1954 (aged 67); Charlottesville, Virginia, United States
- Occupation: Author

Agnes Edwards Rothery Pratt (January 31, 1887 – August 11, 1954), known professionally as Agnes Rothery, was an American author best known for her travel books. Over the course of her career, she published more than 30 works, including travel writing, novels, children's books, and a play, under the names Agnes Rothery, Agnes Edwards, and Agnes Edwards Rothery.

Her travel books covered Europe, Central and South America, Cape Cod, and Virginia. Her 1937 book Denmark: Kingdom of Reason was recognized by King Christian X of Denmark in 1946 for its contribution to Denmark's cause during the German occupation.

== Early life and education ==
Rothery was born Agnes Edwards Rothery on January 31, 1887, in Brookline, Massachusetts, to Rosemond Dale Pentecost and John Jay Elmendorf Rothery. She was one of five children. She attended Wellesley High School in Wellesley, Massachusetts then received her Bachelor of Arts degree from Wellesley College in 1909.

== Career ==
After graduating from college, Rothery worked as an assistant editor at the Ladies' Home Journal and later as literary editor at the Boston Herald. Many of her contributions to the Boston Herald appeared in the column "Agnes Edwards' Morning Talks." She also served as travel editor for House Beautiful.

Rothery's first book, Our Common Road, was published in 1913. In the late 1920s, Rothery began to specialize in travel writing, doing research during her summers abroad. Her travel books covered countries in Europe, South America, and Central America, as well as Cape Cod and the state of Virginia. South American Roundabout, the first of her seven Roundabout titles for children, was published in 1940. She also published fiction throughout her career. Rothery's fiction titles include A Garden Rosary (1917), The House by the Windmill (1923), The High Altar (1924), Into What Port? (1931), and Balm of Gilead (1946).

=== Critical reception ===
Rothery's book, Sweden: The Land and the People (1934), was praised as stimulating reading that was written with grace. Her book, Denmark: Kingdom of Reason (1937), was awarded King Christian X's Medal of Liberation in 1946 in "appreciation of [her] contribution to Denmark's cause during the Nazi occupation." Historian Margaret P. Scott criticized parts of Virginia, The New Dominion as historically inaccurate, while praising its biographical sketches of notable Virginians. Family Album (1942), Rothery's memoir of her father, was praised in a contemporary review in The New York Times as "a book of rare quality."

== Personal life ==
On September 24, 1917, Rothery married Harry Rogers Pratt, who later became a music professor at the University of Virginia. In 1940, they built a Spanish Colonial Revival house on Rothery Road in Charlottesville, Virginia. The house, Recoleta, is listed on the Virginia Landmarks Register.

Rothery died on August 11, 1954, in Charlottesville, Virginia. Her papers are held at the University of Virginia in the Albert and Shirley Small Special Collections Library.

== Selected works ==
- The House of Friendship (1915)
- A Garden Rosary (1917)
- Cape Cod (1918)
- The Old Coast Road: From Boston to Plymouth (1920), illustrated by Louis H. Ruyl
- The House by the Windmill (1923)
- The High Altar (1924)
- Miss Coolidge: A Comedy in One Act (1927), play
- New Roads in Old Virginia (1929), illustrated by Alice Acheson
- Central America and the Spanish Main (1929)
- South America: The West Coast and the East (1930)
- Into What Port? (1931), illustrated by Carl Burger
- Images of Earth: Guatemala (1934)
- Sweden: The Land and the People (1934)
- Denmark: Kingdom of Reason (1937)
- South American Roundabout (1940), illustrated by Carl Burger
- Virginia, The New Dominion (1940), illustrated by E. H. Suydam
- Family Album (1942)
- Washington Roundabout (1942), illustrated by Carl Burger
- A Fitting Habitation (1944)
- Central American Roundabout (1944), illustrated by Kurt Wiese
- Balm of Gilead (1946)
- Scandinavian Roundabout (1946), illustrated by George Gray
- Houses Virginians Have Loved (1954), illustrated with photographs
