= William Rothery =

William Rothery (9 April 1775 – 6 March 1864) was chief of the office of the king's proctor in Doctors' Commons - a society of lawyers practising civil law in London.

== Career ==
In 1819 Rothery was appointed as registrar to an Anglo-Portuguese Commission which paid compensation to owners of Portuguese slave ships which had been seized by British ships during the Napoleonic Wars.

In 1821 he was appointed by the HM Treasury to be the admiralty referee on slave-trade matters, and held the appointment until his retirement in 1860. In 1830–2 he was engaged with some eminent lawyers and civilians in framing rules for the guidance of the vice-admiralty courts in the colonies, the excesses of which had become notorious. In 1840 he was associated with Sir Henry Lytton Bulwer in settling, with two French commissioners, the amount of compensation to be paid to some British subjects for the forcible interruption of their trade by the French at Portendic on the coast of Africa.

Between 1842 and 1844, in conjunction with the judge of the court of admiralty, Admiral Joseph Denman, and James Bandinel of the Foreign Office, he prepared "Instructions for the Guidance of Her Majesty’s Naval Officers Employed in the Suppression of the Slave Trade", which led to more systematic naval activity on the West Coast of Africa.

== Life ==
Rothery married Frances, daughter of Dr. Cadogan of Cowbridge, Glamorganshire. Their son was Henry Cadogan Rothery (1817–1888), wreck commissioner.
