= John Charnock =

English naval biographer (1756–1807)

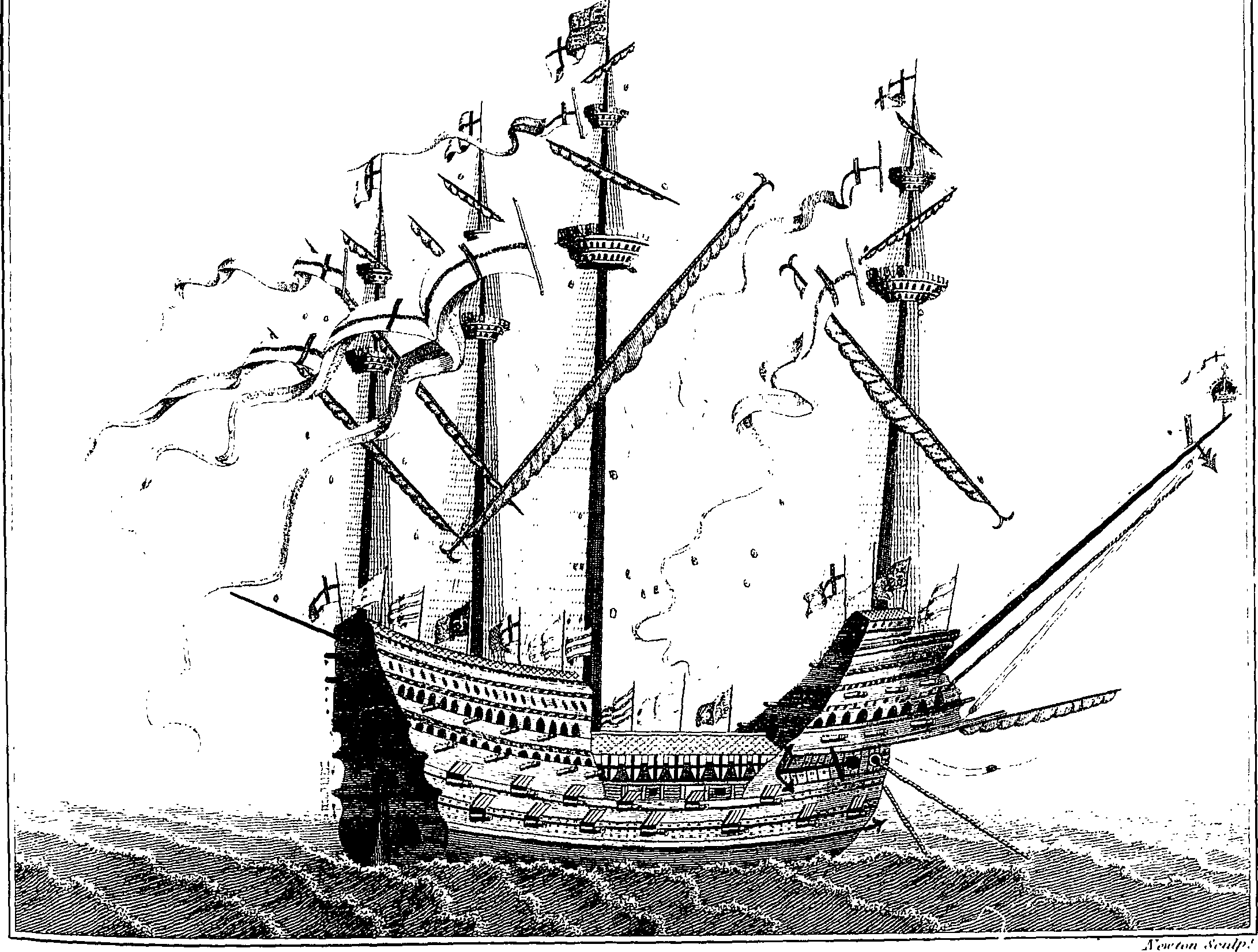
Illustration from Charnock's book on marine architecture

John Charnock (28 November 1756 – 16 May 1807) was a Royal Navy volunteer and author. He wrote a book on the history of marine architecture, a book on Horatio Nelson, 1st Viscount Nelson, and Biographia Navalis about leading figures in Britain's Royal Navy.

Charnock studied at Trinity College, Oxford. He volunteered with the Royal Navy and researched historical and contemporary naval affairs. He was able to hear stories and obtain letters from his friends in the Royal Navy, especially Captain William Locker.

Charnock's six-volume Biographia Navalis was published from 1794 to 1798. In common with William James, William Richard O'Byrne and others who attempted to make a career writing about the Royal Navy, he then encountered financial difficulty.

== Life ==
He was the son of a barrister, John Charnock of Stanford-on-Soar, Nottinghamshire, and his wife Frances Boothby. He studied at Winchester College and at Trinity College, Oxford, where he matriculated on 15 December 1774. In his student days, Charnock wrote political essays for periodicals. Then he fell out with his father over his chosen lifestyle, with his marriage as a possible further grounds for the rupture.

Turning to naval interests, Charnock joined the Royal Navy as a volunteer. He became friends with Captain Locker, Nelson's correspondent and lieutenant-governor of Greenwich Hospital. Locker shared his recollections and became an important source of information for Charnock's research. After inheriting a fortune, Charnock left the navy, but had soon spent all his inheritance and turned to writing to make a living.

After Biographia Navalis, Charnock wrote History of Marine Architecture in a 3 volume set published from 1801 to 1802. He then published a Life of Lord Nelson in 1806. Locker's letters which Charnock had paraphrased for the book were later published in Sir Harris Nicolas's book, in original form: Charnock's versions had used more genteel language, uncharacteristic of Nelson.

Charnock fell into poverty. Unable to pay his debts, he died on 16 May 1807, at the King's Bench Prison, and has a slab in the old churchyard at Lee. He left behind a widow, Mary, the daughter of Peregrine Jones of Philadelphia, but no children. It was said of Mary that she showed "exemplary conduct in the vicissitudes of her husband's fortune". She died on 26 May 1836 and is buried with Charnock.

== Bibliography ==
Charnock's major works were:

- Biographia Navalis, Or, Impartial Memoirs of the Lives and Characters of Officers of the Navy of Great Britain, from the Year 1660 to the Present Time; Drawn from the Most Authentic Sources, and Disposed in a Chronological Arrangement (6 vols., 1794–8, OCLC 560864941) Reprinted by Cambridge University Press in 2011 ISBN 9781108026338 OCLC 710993756
- An History of Marine Architecture: Including an Enlarged and Progressive View of the Nautical Regulations and Naval History, Both Civil and Military, of All Nations, Especially of Great Britain (3 vols., 1801–2). This illustrated book on marine architecture was published in three volumes from 1800 to 1802. According to Cambridge University Press it "stands as the first serious study of naval architecture in Britain in particular, while also noting major developments in Europe and beyond." Volume 1 covers the origins of marine architecture in commerce and war from the ancient Chinese and Egyptians through the Greeks and Romans up until the death of Richard III.
- Biographical Memoirs of Lord Viscount Nelson - With Observations, Critical and Explanatory (1806)

Charnock also authored The Rights of a Free People 1792, A Letter on Finance and on National Defence, 1798, and many smaller pieces. Cambridge University Press has reissued some of his books as part of the Cambridge Library Collection.
