= William Congreve (disambiguation) =

William Congreve (1670–1729) was an English playwright and poet.

William Congreve may also refer to:

- Sir William Congreve, 1st Baronet (1742–1814), father of the inventor
- Sir William Congreve, 2nd Baronet (1772–1828), inventor
- William Congreve (died 1843), Lord of the Manor at Aldermaston
- Billy Congreve (1891–1916), Victoria Cross recipient

== See also ==
- Congreve (surname)
