= Congreve (surname) =

Congreve is a surname. Notable people with the surname include:

- Ambrose Congreve (1907–2011), Irish industrialist, best known for his world-famous garden at Mount Congreve
- Billy Congreve (1891–1916)
- Cameron Congreve, Swansea City footballer, born 2004
- Cecil Ralph Townshend Congreve (1876–1952), English tea planter in India
- Galfred Congreve (fl. 1850–1881), Scottish amateur footballer and cricketer, later a civil servant
- Richard Congreve (1818–1899), English philosopher
- Walter Congreve, Governor of Malta from 1924 to 1926
- William Congreve (1670–1729), English playwright
- Sir William Congreve, 1st Baronet (1742–1814), pioneer in gunpowder production
- Sir William Congreve, 2nd Baronet (1772–1828), creator of the Congreve rocket
