= Congreve =

Congreve may refer to:

- Congreve (surname)
- Congreve (crater), a lunar crater
- Congreve (horse), an Argentine thoroughbred racehorse who sired Kayak II
- Congreve, Penkridge, a manor house and its former land in Penkridge, Staffordshire, England
- Congreve rocket, military weapon developed in 1804
- Mount Congreve, the stately home of the Congreve family in County Waterford, Ireland
