= Christopher Brandon =

Christopher Brandon may refer to:

- Chris Brandon, English footballer
- Christopher Brandon (police officer), superintendent of the Dartford Constabulary

== See also ==
- Chris Brandon (writer), British television screenwriter
