= Congreve baronets of Walton (1812) =

Escutcheon of the Congreve baronets

The Congreve baronetcy, of Walton in the County of Stafford, was created in the Baronetage of the United Kingdom on 7 December 1812 for William Congreve, best remembered for his innovations in the production of gunpowder. He was succeeded by his son, William, the second Baronet, who gained fame as the inventor of the Congreve rocket. The title is presumed to have become extinct on the death of the 3rd Baronet, and the failure of the male line. The date at which this happened was the subject of a legal ruling.

== Congreve baronets, of Walton (1812) ==
- Sir William Congreve, 1st Baronet (1743–1814)
- Sir William Congreve, 2nd Baronet (1772–1828). He died leaving two sons and a daughter.
- Sir William Augustus Congreve, 3rd Baronet (born 1827, died in or after 1860). At the beginning of the 1880s, William Augustus Congreve, who had emigrated to New Zealand in 1847 to farm, was not known to be living (he died on 9 December 1887 at Surry Hills, Sydney). A probate case brought in 1882 decided that his younger brother William Frederick, who had also disappeared, could be considered dead for legal purposes; but left the matter open in the case of the 3rd Baronet. In November of that year, further enquiries asked for by the judge Sir James Hannan having been carried out, the 3rd Baronet was pronounced to have died in 1860 or later.

== Notes ==
Baronetage of the United Kingdom
Preceded by Stamer baronets	Congreve baronets of Walton; 7 December 1812	Succeeded by Bertie baronets
