= Sir William Augustus Congreve, 3rd Baronet =

English baronet (1825–1887)

Sir William Augustus Congreve 3rd Baronet
- Born: 1825; Westminster, Middlesex, England
- Died: 9 December 1887; Surry Hills, Sydney, New South Wales, Australia
- Other name: Captain William Edward Brougham Gurnett (alias)
- Parent(s): Sir William Congreve, 2nd Baronet; Isabella Charlotte Carvalho
- Relatives: Sir William Congreve, 1st Baronet (grandfather)

Sir William Augustus Congreve, 3rd Baronet (1825 – 9 December 1887), was a British baronet who inherited his title at the age of three following the death of his father, the rocket inventor Sir William Congreve, 2nd Baronet. He emigrated to the colonies in 1847 and lived the remainder of his life in Australia under the alias "Captain William Edward Brougham Gurnett". The baronetcy was presumed extinct in 1882, five years before his actual death in Sydney.

== Early life ==
William Augustus Congreve was baptized on 27 August 1825 at St Clement Danes church in Middlesex. He was the eldest legitimate son of Sir William Congreve, 2nd Baronet and Isabella Charlotte Carvalho. His father, renowned for developing the Congreve rocket, served as Equerry to George IV and Member of Parliament for Plymouth. His mother, of Portuguese descent, had been widowed from her first marriage to Irish surgeon Henry Nisbett McEvoy before marrying Congreve in late 1824.

In 1826, his father became embroiled in the Arigna Mining Company fraud. A Parliamentary select committee in April 1827 found that Congreve's conduct amounted to either "a not unwilling suppression of scruples" or "an insensibility to evident obligation". Sir William Congreve, 2nd Baronet, fled to France and died in Toulouse on 16 May 1828, leaving his estate severely indebted.

William Augustus inherited the baronetcy at the age of three. His mother was granted a £400 Civil List pension. On 25 April 1835, his mother remarried to Charles Fenton Whiting.

== Emigration and colonial life ==
In 1847, Congreve emigrated to New Zealand, later moving to Australia. He resided at Frankville, 70 Botany Street, Surry Hills.

== Death and extinction of the title ==
Sir William Augustus Congreve died in Surry Hills, Sydney, on 9 December 1887. His obituary in the Newcastle Morning Herald and Miners' Advocate revealed the connection between his two identities. With his death, the Congreve baronetcy of Walton became extinct.

== Family ==
William Augustus had two younger siblings: Isabella Maria Louisa Christina Congreve (1826–1907) and William Frederick Congreve (1827 or 1828–c. 1860). He also had a stepbrother, Charles Henry McEvoy (1815–1837), his mother's son from her first marriage.

His father had fathered at least two illegitimate sons before marriage. One of these, Harry Congreve (born 1811), was the son of Elizabeth Capron.

His mother, Isabella, died in Brighton on 5 November 1872, aged 72.

Baronetage of the United Kingdom
Preceded by William Congreve	Baronet (of Walton); 1828–1887	Extinct
