= Congreve baronets =

There have been two baronetcies created for persons with the surname Congreve, both in the Baronetage of the United Kingdom. Both creations are extinct.

- Congreve baronets of Walton (1812)
- Congreve baronets of Congreve (1927): see Geoffrey Congreve (1897–1941)

Escutcheon of the Congreve baronets of Walton

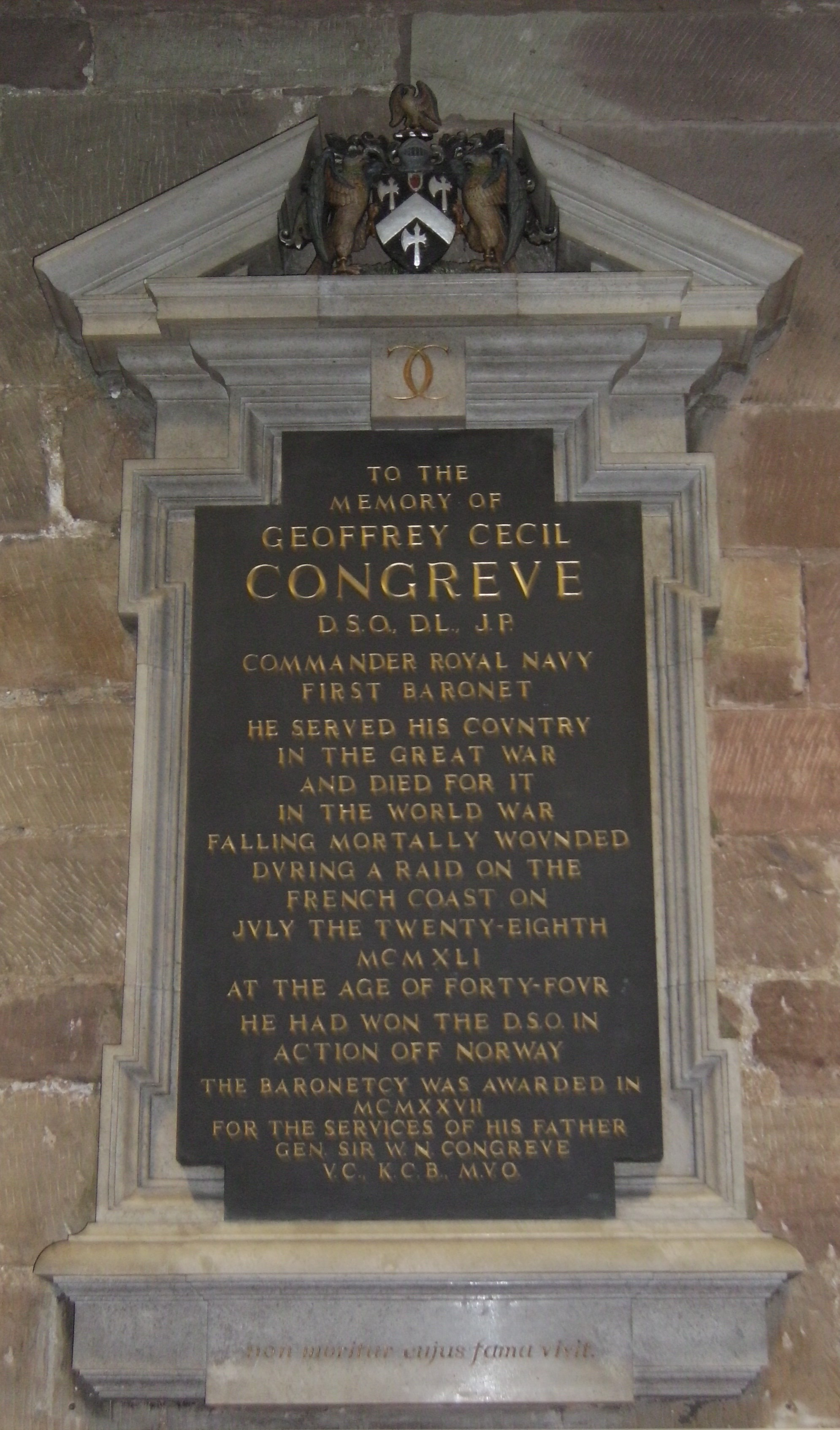
Memorial to Sir Geoffrey Congreve, the sole baronet of the second creation. South nave aisle of St. Michael and All Hallows church, Penkridge, Staffordshire

The Congreve Baronetcy, of Walton in the County of Stafford, was created in the Baronetage of the United Kingdom on 7 December 1812 for William Congreve, comptroller of the Royal Laboratory at Woolwich and innovator in gunpowder manufacture. He was succeeded by his eldest son, William, who gained fame as the inventor of the Congreve rocket and served as Equerry to George IV.

The second Baronet died in 1828, leaving the title to his three-year-old son William Augustus, the third Baronet. The young heir emigrated to the colonies in 1847, eventually settling in Australia where he lived under the alias "Captain William Edward Brougham Gurnett". The baronetcy was presumed extinct in 1882, though the third Baronet did not die until 9 December 1887 in Surry Hills, Sydney.

The Congreve Baronetcy, of Congreve in the County of Stafford, was created in the Baronetage of the United Kingdom on 30 June 1927 for Lieutenant-Commander Geoffrey Congreve. He was the son of General Sir Walter Congreve and the younger brother of Billy Congreve. The title became extinct when Congreve was killed in a commando raid on the French coast in 1941.

== Congreve baronets, of Walton (1812) ==
- Sir William Congreve, 1st Baronet (1743–1814)
- Sir William Congreve, 2nd Baronet (1772–1828)
- Sir William Augustus Congreve, 3rd Baronet (1825–1887)

== Congreve baronets, of Congreve (1927) ==
- Sir Geoffrey Congreve, 1st Baronet (1897–1941)
