= Congreve (crater) =

Lunar impact crater

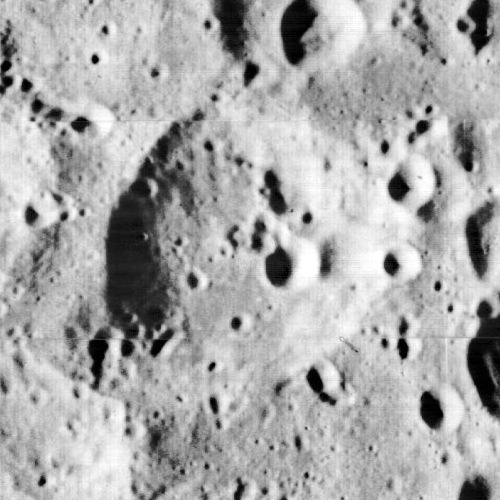
- Lunar Orbiter 1 image
- Coordinates: 0.2°S 167.3°W
- Diameter: 57.61 km (35.80 mi)
- Depth: Unknown
- Colongitude: 168° at sunrise
- Formation: Nectarian
- Eponym: William Congreve

Congreve is a degraded lunar impact crater that is located on the far side of the Moon relative to the Earth, and lies across the lunar equator. It lies to the west-northwest of the massive walled plain designated Korolev. To the southeast is the crater Icarus, and due north is Zhukovskiy.

On the lunar geologic timescale, this crater was formed during the Nectarian age. The rim of this crater is worn by impact erosion, particularly along the eastern side where a pair of small crater lie along the edge. The rim and inner wall are more prominent to the west and north, while it forms only a shallow ridge to the southeast. The interior floor is marked by a cluster of small craters in the northeastern part, and tiny craterlets scattered across the remainder.

This crater is named after British inventer and rocketry pioneer William Congreve (1772–1828). Its designation was officially adopted by the International Astronomical Union in 1970.

== Satellite craters ==
By convention these features are identified on lunar maps by placing the letter on the side of the crater midpoint that is closest to Congreve.

Congreve	Latitude	Longitude	Diameter
G	0.9° S	163.7° W	17 km
H	1.2° S	165.2° W	37 km
L	3.6° S	166.3° W	30 km
N	3.4° S	168.2° W	31 km
Q	1.4° S	169.6° W	59 km
U	0.6° S	170.7° W	59 km
