= Sir William Congreve, 2nd Baronet =

British politician (1772–1828)

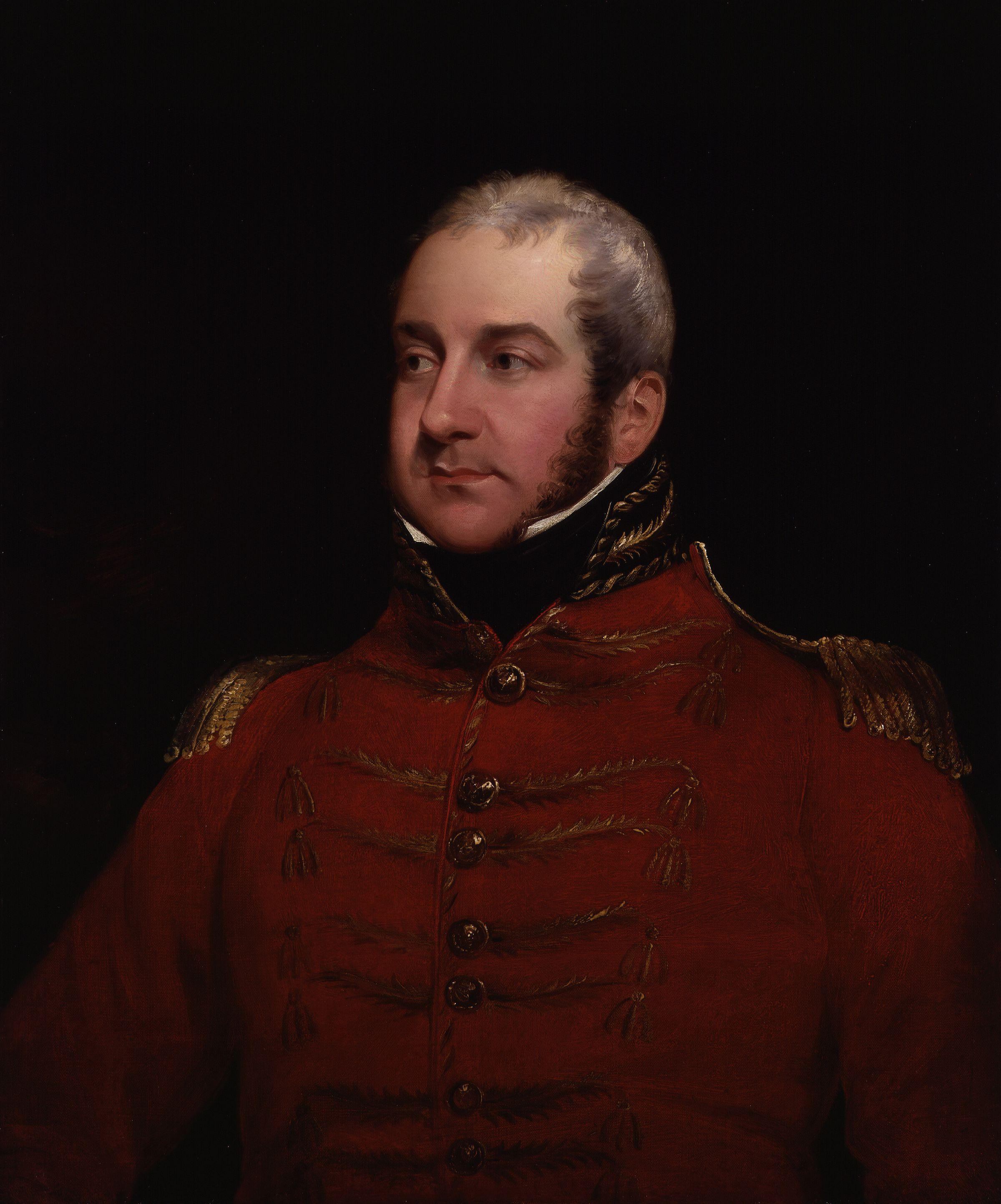
A portrait of Congreve by James Londale made c. 1812

Sir William Congreve, 2nd Baronet KCH FRS (20 May 1772 – 16 May 1828) was a British Army officer, Tory politician, publisher and inventor. A pioneer in the field of rocket artillery, he was renowned for his development and use of Congreve rockets during the Napoleonic Wars. His adaptation of Mysorean rocket technology from the Kingdom of Mysore represented a crucial development in the history of military rocketry, bridging Eastern innovation with Western industrial production and establishing rocket artillery as a practical weapon system that would influence military technology into the space age.

== Biography ==
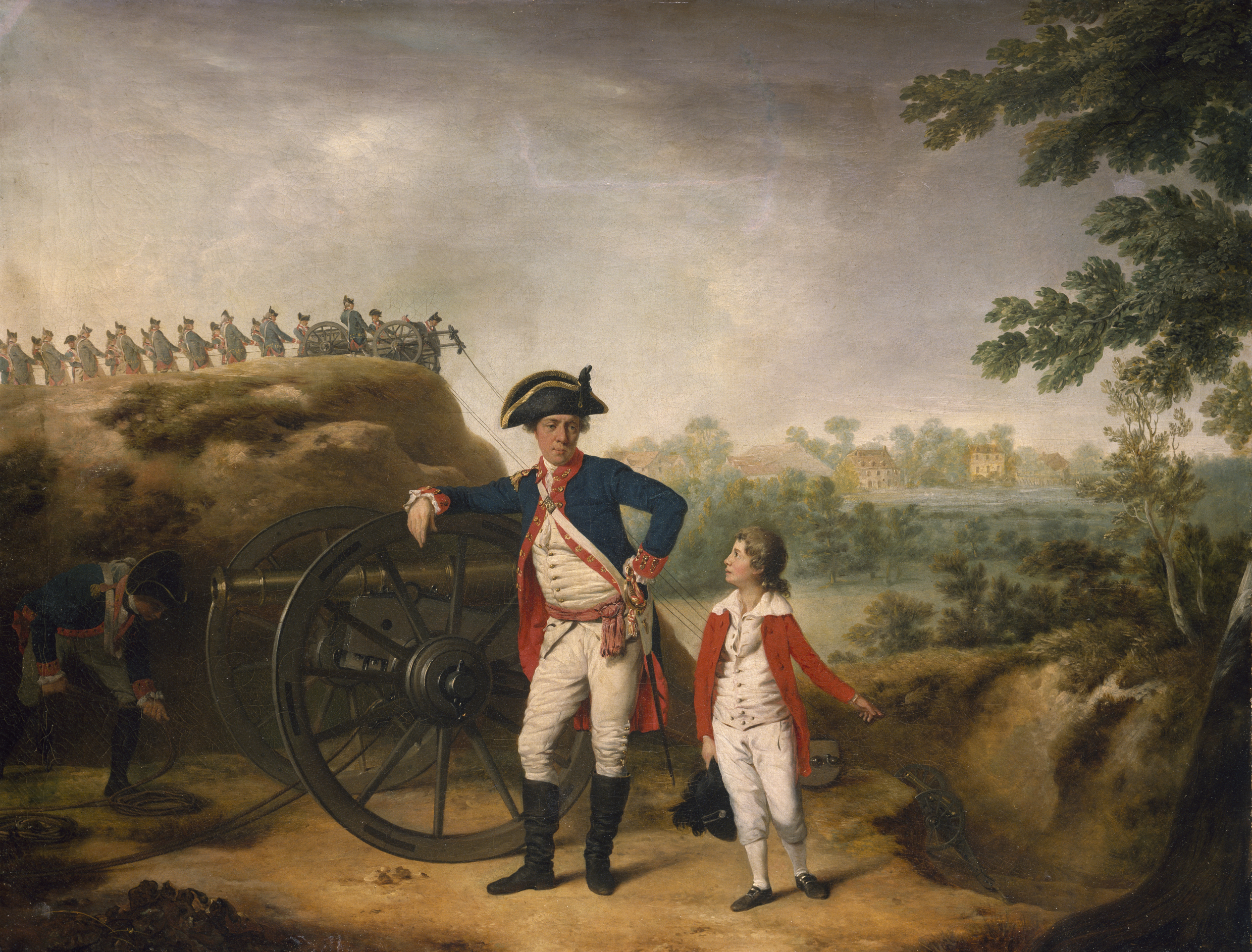
Young William Congreve (aged 10) with his father Captain William Congreve, by Philip Reinagle, c.1782. The elder Congreve leans against an eight-pounder cannon, reflecting his artillery expertise.

He was the eldest son of Rebeca Elmston and Lt. General Sir William Congreve, 1st Baronet, the Comptroller of the Royal Laboratories at the Royal Arsenal and raised in Kent, England. In 1782, aged 10, he appeared alongside his father in a portrait by Philip Reinagle, commissioned whilst the family resided at Eastcombe House in Charlton. This painting is now in the National Gallery of Ireland. He was educated at Newcome's school in Hackney, Wolverhampton Grammar School and Singlewell School in Kent. He then studied law at Trinity College, Cambridge, graduating BA in 1793 and MA in 1796.

=== Career at Woolwich and the 1814 celebrations ===
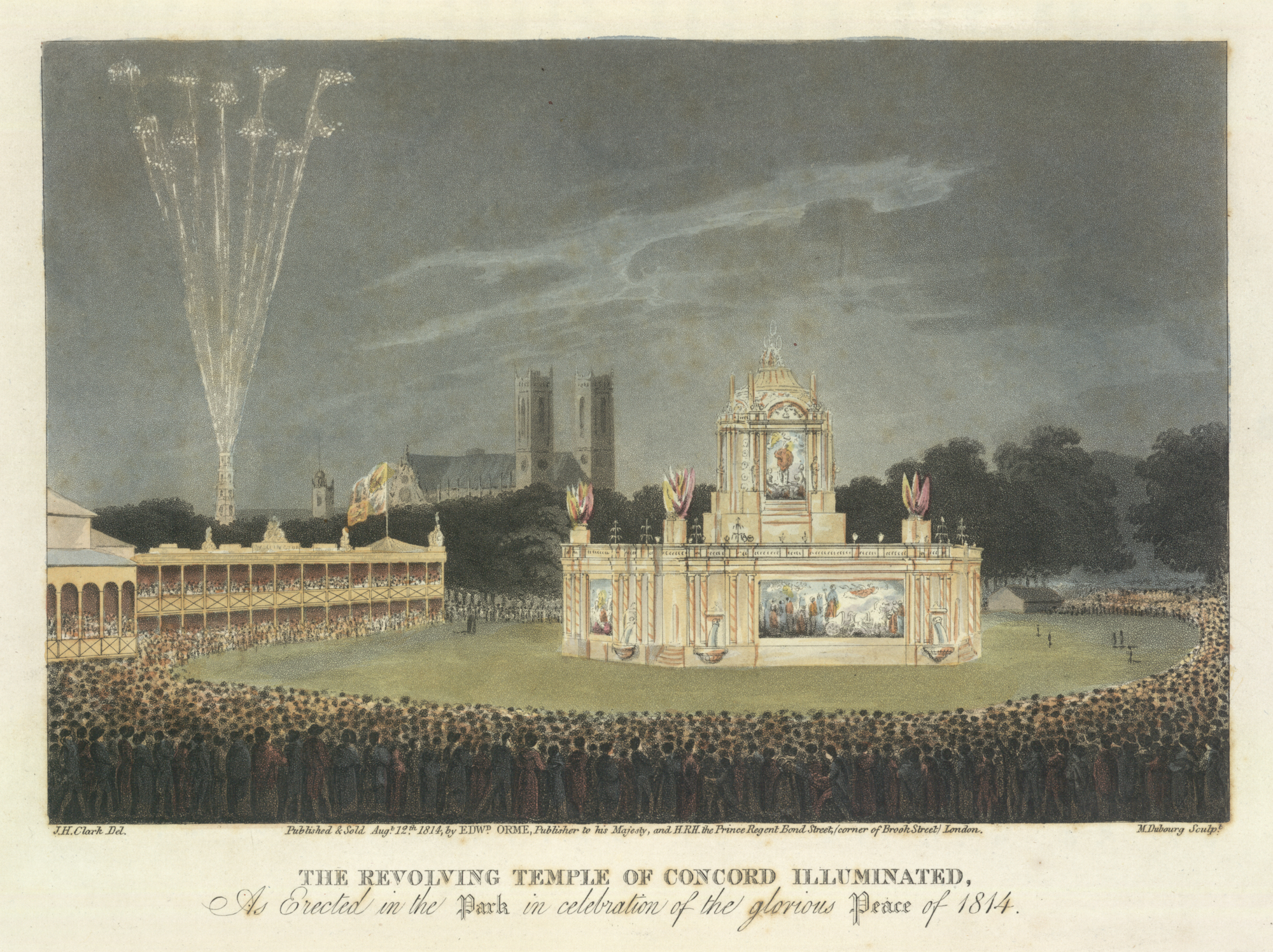
The Revolving Temple of Concord illuminated in St James's Park, erected for the peace celebrations of 1814 which Congreve masterminded

In 1814 he succeeded his father as second Baronet Congreve and to all his father's appointments, including Commandant of the Royal Military Repository and Superintendent of Military Machines at Woolwich.

Congreve had been "closely involved in the series of celebratory events marking the peace of 1814 and had masterminded the Grand National Jubilee on 1 August of that year." These celebrations marked the centenary of the Hanoverian succession and the defeat of Napoleon. The Prince Regent commissioned architect John Nash to design a temporary structure in St James's Park for the festivities, which included an elaborate canvas tent pavilion—the structure that would later become the Rotunda. Congreve organised spectacular firework displays for these peace celebrations, demonstrating both his pyrotechnic expertise and his skill in managing large-scale public events.

When the Prince Regent ordered the dismantling of the Rotunda from Carlton House in 1818, Congreve successfully petitioned for it to be re-erected at the Royal Military Repository at Woolwich, requesting on 7 December 1818 that the building be erected "on the brow of the Hill at the eastern boundary of the Repository Grounds, that spot being the most convenient as well as the most picturesque situation for it." In this role, Congreve was thus instrumental in securing the Rotunda for use as a museum, where it would house military trophies and serve as a monument to British military achievement. Congreve later organised the firework displays for the coronation of George IV in 1821.

=== Early military and political career ===
In 1803, he was a volunteer in the London and Westminster Light Horse, and was a London businessman who published a polemical newspaper, the Royal Standard and Political Register, which was Tory, pro-government and anti-Cobbett. Following a damaging libel action against it in 1804, Congreve withdrew from publishing and applied himself to inventing. Many years previously, several unsuccessful experiments had been made at the Royal Laboratory in Woolwich by Lt. General Thomas Desaguliers. In 1804, at his own expense, he began experimenting with rockets at Woolwich. Congreve was named as comptroller of the Royal Laboratory at Woolwich from 1814 until his death. (Congreve's father had also held the same post.)

Congreve was awarded the honorary rank of lieutenant colonel in the Hanoverian army's artillery in 1811, and was often referred to as "Colonel Congreve", later made major general in the same army. He was elected a Fellow of the Royal Society in March that year. He was also awarded the Order of St. George following the Battle of Leipzig in 1813 and 1816 he was made Knight Commander of the Royal Guelphic Order (KCH). In 1821 he was awarded the Order of the Sword by the King of Sweden.

He enjoyed the friendship of the Prince Regent, in whose household he served as an equerry from 1811, carrying on the service when the Prince, who supported his rocket projects, became King George IV in 1820.

Earlier in 1812 he offered to contest for Parliament the borough of Liverpool but withdrew before polling for lack of support. He entered Parliament later that year when he was nominated as MP for the rotten borough of Gatton in 1812, but withdrew at the next elections in 1814 in favour of the son of the borough's proprietor Sir Mark Wood. In 1818 he was returned as Member for Plymouth, a seat he held until his death.

=== Marriage and family ===
After fathering several illegitimate children with different mothers, Congreve married in late 1824 at Wessel, Prussia, Isabella Charlotte Carvalho, a young widow of Portuguese descent who had been raised in a Catholic family. She was the widow of Henry Nisbitt McEvoy, an Irish surgeon, and brought her young son Charles Henry McEvoy (1815–1837) into the household. The marriage took place five years before the Roman Catholic Relief Act 1829, which removed most remaining restrictions on Catholics in the United Kingdom.

Congreve was 52 and Isabella was 24 at the time of their marriage. They had three children: Sir William Augustus Congreve (1825–1887), who inherited the baronetcy as the 3rd Baronet; Isabella Maria Louisa Christina (1826–1907); and William Frederick Congreve (1827 or 1828–1860).

Around 1825–1826, Congreve likely commissioned Highcombe House in Charlton, a Regency villa where he resided from c.1826 until shortly before his death in 1828. Charlton thus bookended Congreve's life: his childhood was spent at Eastcombe House in the 1780s, whilst his final years in England were spent at Highcombe. Both residences were situated close to his professional base at the Royal Arsenal in Woolwich, allowing ready access to the Royal Laboratory and the Rotunda he had secured for the Repository.

=== Business ventures and final years ===
In 1824, he became general manager of the English Association for Gas Lighting on the Continent, a sizeable business producing gas for several cities in mainland Europe, including Berlin.

In later years, he became a businessman and was chairman of the Equitable Loan Bank, director of the Arigna Iron and Coal Company, the Palladium Insurance Company and the Peruvian Mining Company. After a major fraud case began against him in 1826 in connection with the Arigna company, he fled to France, where he was taken seriously ill. He was prosecuted in his absence, the Lord Chancellor ultimately ruling, just before Congreve's death, that the transaction was "clearly fraudulent" and designed to profit Congreve and others.

He died in Toulouse, France, in May 1828, aged 55, and was buried there in the Protestant and Jewish cemetery of Chemin du Béarnais. Isabella was widowed at age 28 with three young children and her teenage stepson. She was granted a £400 Civil List pension and actively pursued compensation from the British government for her late husband's rocket inventions. In 1835, she married for the third time to Charles Fenton Whiting. Isabella died in Brighton on 5 November 1872, aged 72, having outlived Congreve by 44 years.

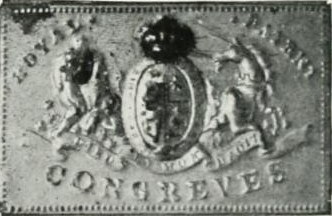
A tin "Congreves" matchbox (1827)

Congreve's name was used for a kind of friction match, "Congreves", though he was not involved in their invention or production. In 1970, Congreve crater on the far side of the Moon was named after him.

== Congreve Rockets ==
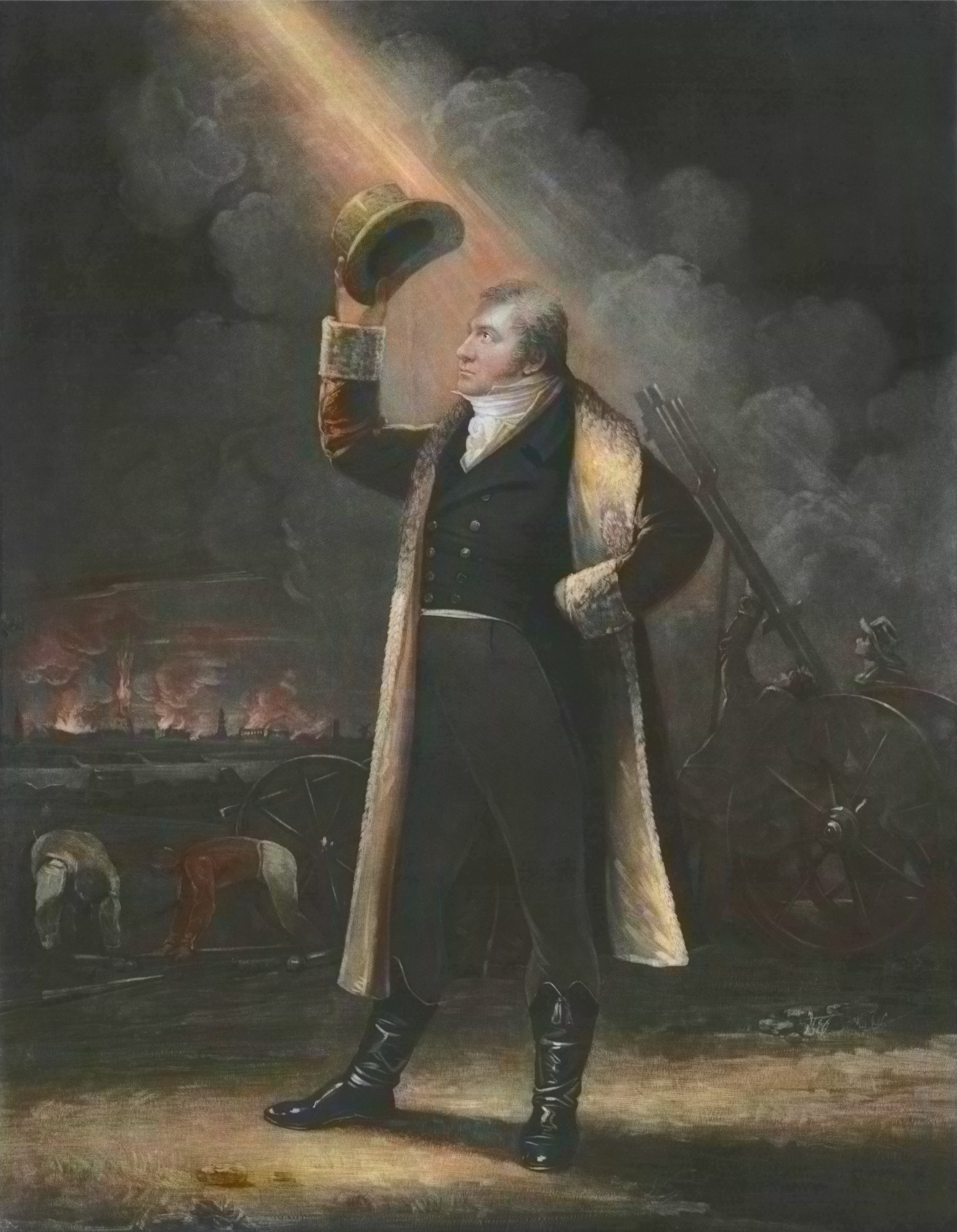
Portrait of William Congreve with a background scene of rocket fire during the British bombardment of Copenhagen, painted by James Lonsdale in 1807

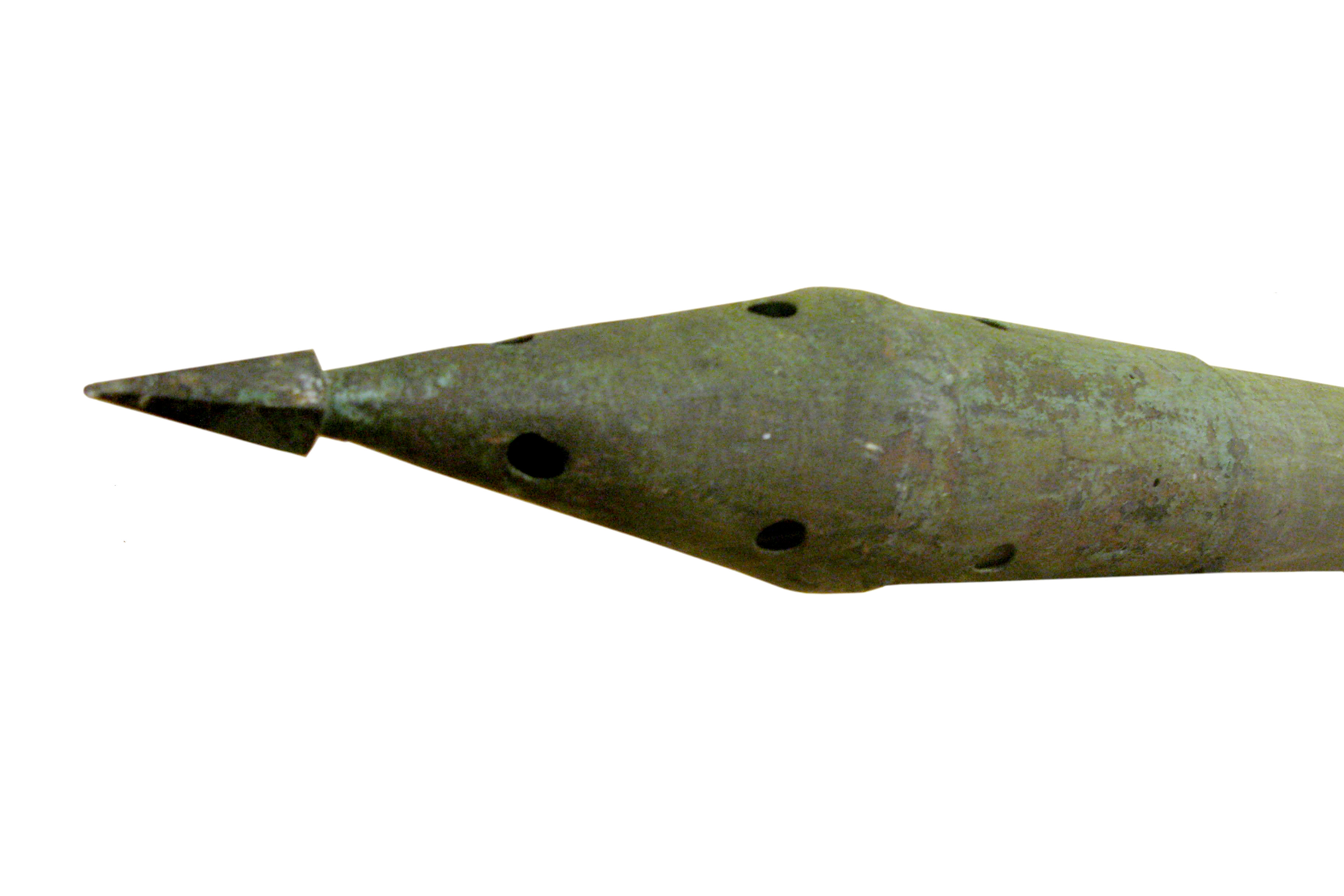
Tip of a Congreve rocket from the Napoleonic Wars, on display at Paris Naval Museum

Mysorean rockets were the first iron-cased rockets that were successfully deployed for military use. Hyder Ali, the 18th century ruler of Mysore and his son and successor Tipu Sultan used them against the forces of the East India Company during the Anglo-Mysore Wars, beginning in 1780 with the Battle of Pollilur. In battles at Seringapatam in 1792 and 1799 these rockets were used with minimal effect against the British.

The experiences of the British with Mysorean rockets, mentioned in Munro's book of 1789, eventually led to the Royal Arsenal beginning a military rocket R&D program in 1801. Several rocket cases were collected from Mysore and sent to Britain for analysis. The development was chiefly the work of William Congreve, who set up a research and development programme at the Woolwich Arsenal's laboratory. After development work was complete the rockets were manufactured in quantity further north, near Waltham Abbey, Essex. He was told that "the British at Seringapatam had suffered more from the rockets than from the shells or any other weapon used by the enemy." "In at least one instance", an eyewitness told Congreve, "a single rocket had killed three men and badly wounded others."

It has been suggested that Congreve may have adapted iron-cased gunpowder rockets for use by the British military from prototypes created by the Irish nationalist Robert Emmet during Emmet's Rebellion in 1803. But this seems far less likely given the fact that the British had been exposed to Indian rockets since 1780 at the latest, and that a vast quantity of unused rockets and their construction equipment fell into British hands at the end of the Anglo-Mysore Wars in 1799, 4 years before Emmet's rockets.

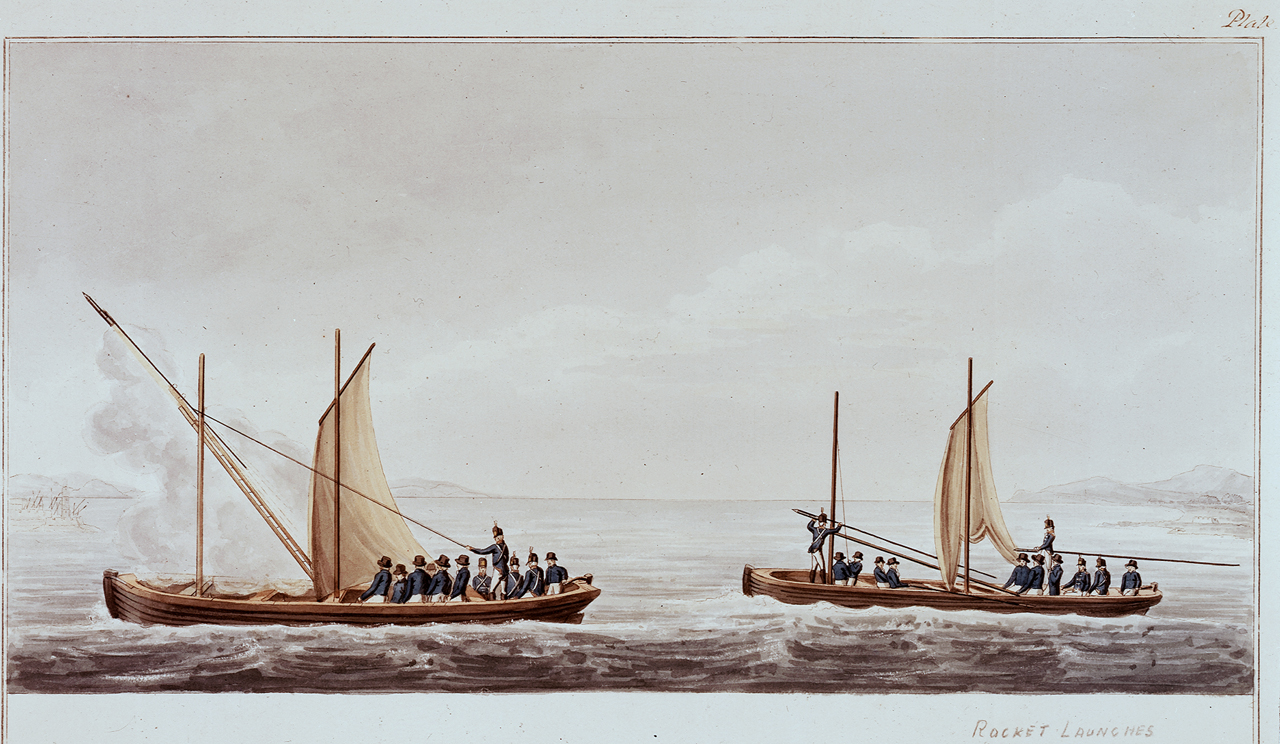
"Use of rockets from boats" – An illustration from William Congreve's book demonstrating naval deployment methods

Congreve began in 1804 by buying the best rockets on the London market, but found that their greatest range was only 600 yards. After spending several hundred pounds of his own money on experiments, he was able to make a rocket that would travel 1,500 yards. He then applied to Lord Chatham, the responsible minister in charge of the Ordnance Department, for permission to have some large rockets made at Woolwich. Permission was granted and several six-pounder rockets made on principles he had previously ascertained achieved a range of full two thousand yards. By the spring of 1806, he was producing 32-pounder rockets ranging 3,000 yards.

Congreve first demonstrated solid fuel rockets at the Royal Arsenal in 1805. He considered his work sufficiently advanced to engage in two Royal Navy attacks on the French fleet at Boulogne, France, one that year and one the next. In 1807 Congreve and sixteen Ordnance Department civilian employees were present at the Bombardment of Copenhagen, during which 300 rockets contributed to the conflagration of the city.

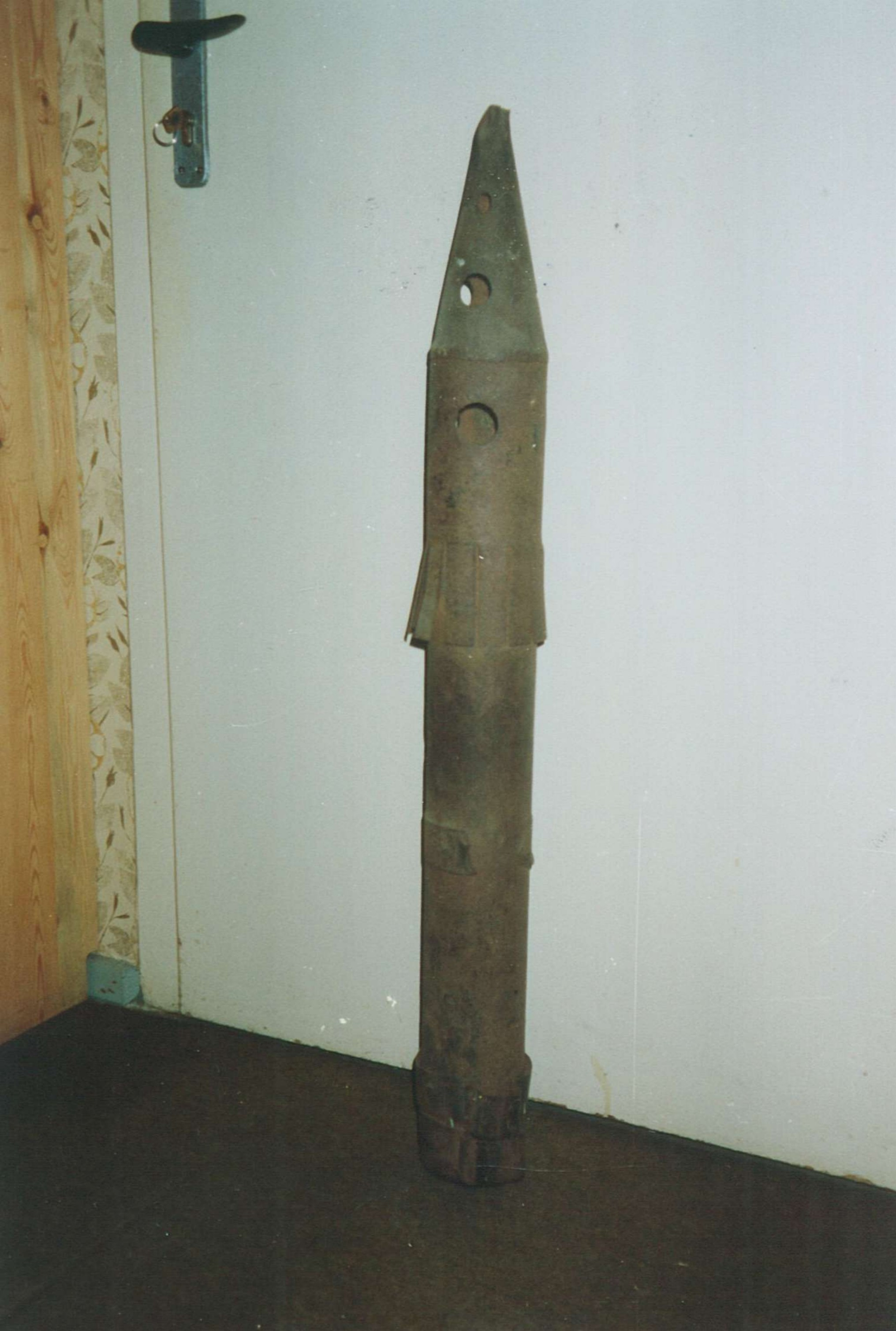
32-pounder rocket c.1813, showing the scale and construction of the medium-range battlefield rockets

Congreve rockets were successfully used for the remainder of the Napoleonic Wars, with the most important employment of the weapon being at the Battle of Leipzig in 1813. In the Battle of Göhrde and at Leipzig, rockets fired from ground-mounted troughs at low trajectory proved fearsome weapons at close range. The "rockets' red glare" in the American national anthem describes their firing at Fort McHenry during the War of 1812. In January 1814 the Royal Artillery absorbed the various companies armed with rockets into two Rocket Troops within the Royal Horse Artillery. They remained in the arsenal of the United Kingdom until the 1850s.

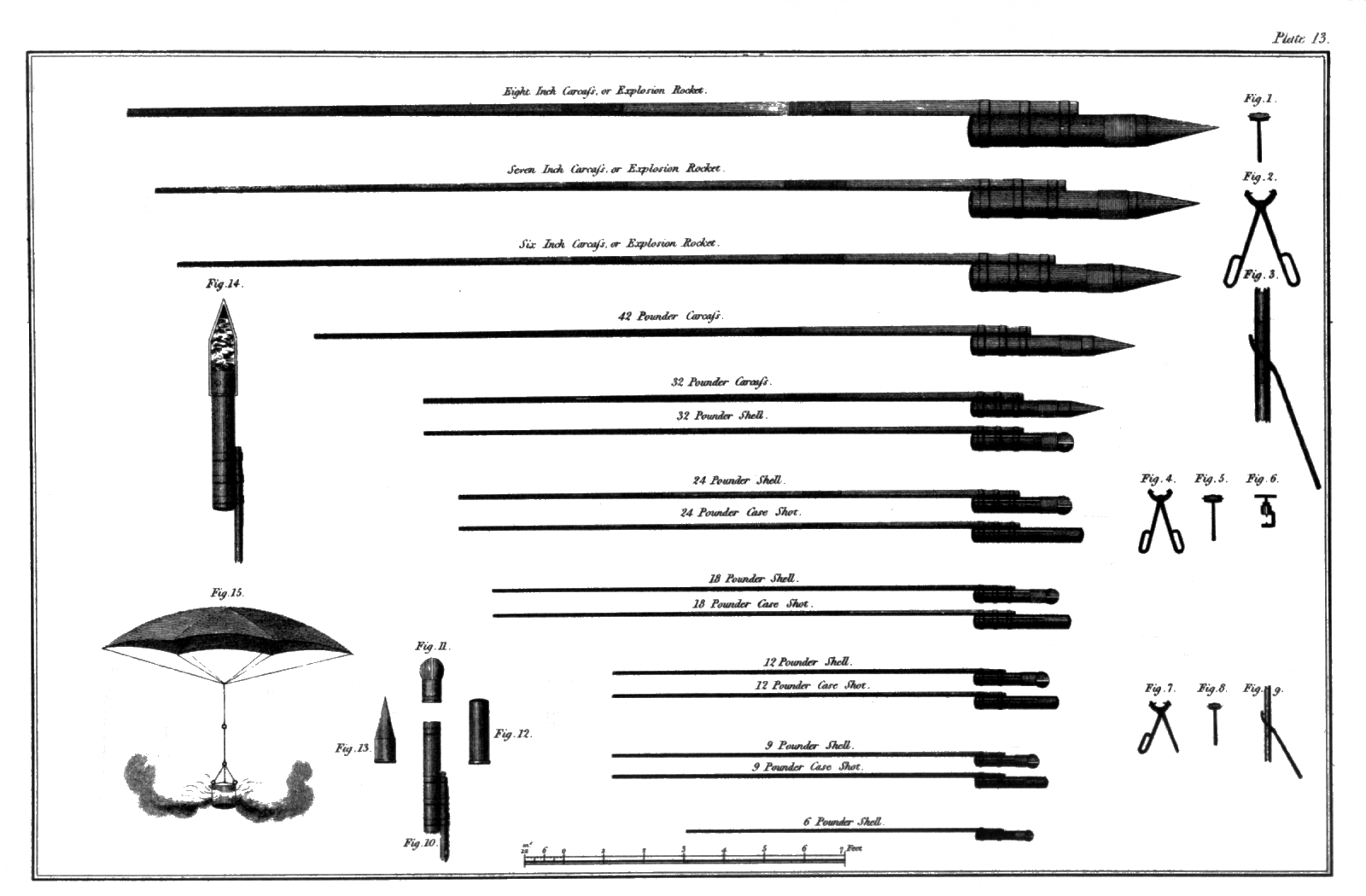
Congreve rockets from Congreve's original work

== Other inventions ==
Besides his rockets, Congreve was a prolific (if indifferently successful) inventor for the remainder of his life. He registered 18 patents, of which 2 were for rockets.

Congreve invented a gun-recoil mounting, a time-fuze, and a rocket parachute attachment. In 1813, he patented a hydropneumatic canal lock, which was installed at Hampstead Road Lock in north London. This lock used compressed air and water pressure to raise and lower canal boats more efficiently than traditional lock mechanisms, representing one of his more successful practical engineering achievements. He also invented an improved sluice design in 1813.

In 1821, Congreve developed a process of colour printing which was widely used in Germany. He invented a new form of steam engine and a method of consuming smoke which was applied at the Royal Laboratory at Woolwich. He also took out patents for a clock in which time was measured by a ball rolling along a zig-zag track on an inclined plane; for protecting buildings against fire; inlaying and combining metals; unforgeable bank note paper to prevent counterfeiting; a method of killing whales by means of rockets (successfully tested in practice in 1821 aboard the whaling vessel Fame, which Congreve equipped at his own expense, with Captain Scoresby reporting successful trials from the Greenland fishery); improvements in the manufacture of gunpowder; stereotype plates for printing; fireworks; and gas meters.

Congreve's unsuccessful perpetual motion scheme involved an endless band which should raise more water by its capillary action on one side than on the other. He used capillary action of fluids that would disobey the law of never rising above their own level, so to produce a continual ascent and overflow. The device had an inclined plane over pulleys. At the top and bottom, there travelled an endless band of sponge, a bed, and, over this, again an endless band of heavy weights jointed together. The whole stood over the surface of still water. The capillary action raised the water, whereas the same thing could not happen in the part, since the weights would squeeze the water out. Hence, it was heavier than the other; but as "we know that if it were the same weight, there would be equilibrium, if the heavy chain be also uniform". Therefore, the extra weight of it would cause the chain to move round in the direction of the arrow, and this would go on, supposedly, continually.

== Legacy ==
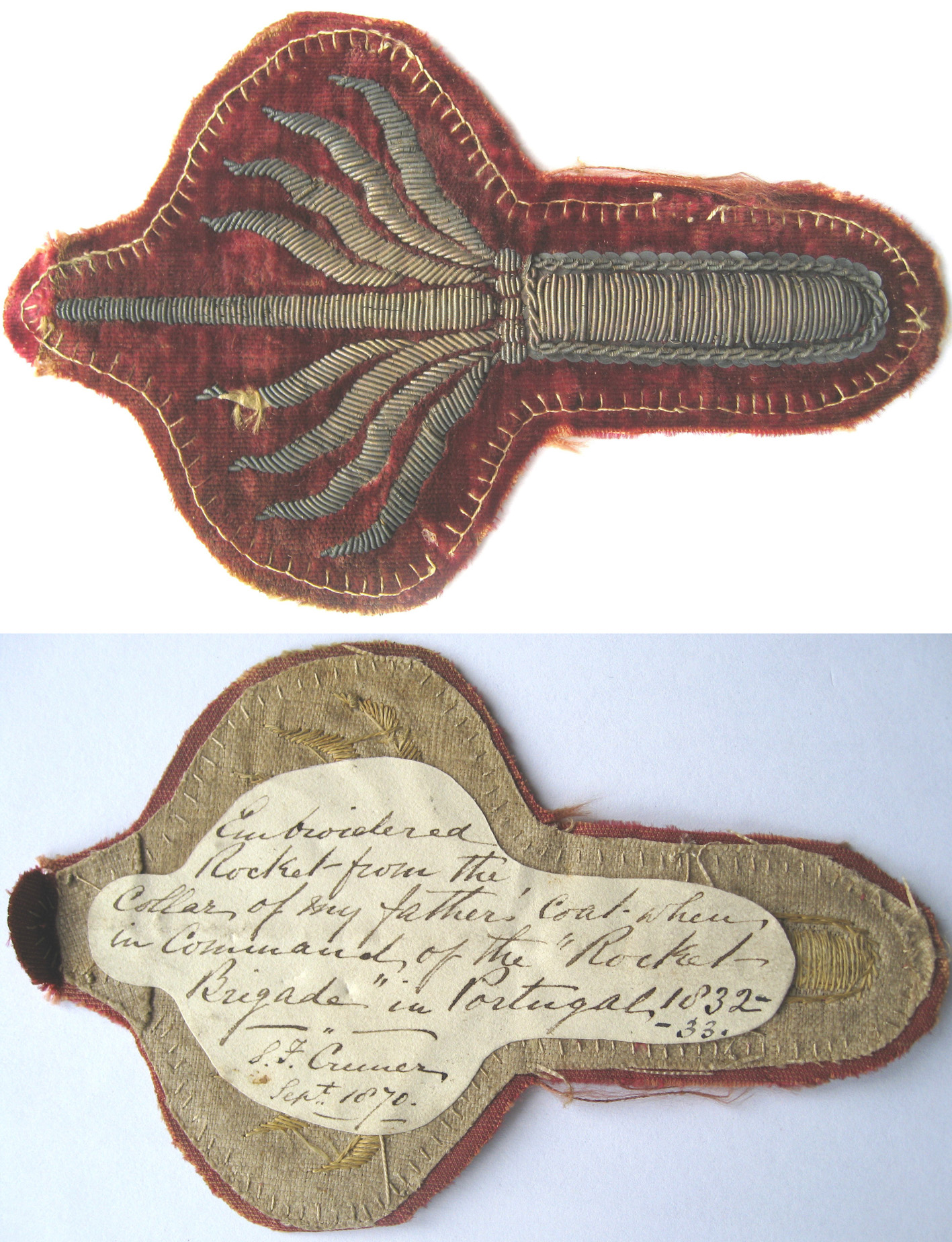
Congreve rocket patch from the Portugal campaign, 1832–33, which belonged to Christopher Brandon, Superintendent of Police, Dartford. This patch was flown into Earth orbit by Jared Isaacman, commander of the SpaceX Polaris Dawn spaceflight in September 2024

Congreve's work represented a pivotal moment in the history of rocketry, transforming rockets from curiosities and fireworks into practical military weapons. By adapting and systematising the iron-cased rocket technology pioneered in Mysore, he created the first Western rocket artillery system that could be manufactured at scale and deployed effectively on the battlefield. His rockets remained in regular use until the 1850s, when they were superseded by the improved spinning design by William Hale. The principles Congreve established—solid fuel propulsion, standardised calibres, and systematic deployment methods—influenced rocket development throughout the 19th century and laid conceptual groundwork for later advances in rocketry.

Beyond military applications, Congreve's rockets found humanitarian use. In the 1870s, they were employed to carry rescue lines to vessels in distress, gradually superseding earlier systems. His rockets also achieved lasting cultural resonance: the "rockets' red glare" in the American national anthem immortalised their use at Fort McHenry during the War of 1812, ensuring that Congreve's invention would be remembered in one of the world's most widely performed pieces of music.

In September 2024, a historical Congreve rocket patch from the Portugal campaign of 1832–33 was flown into Earth orbit by Jared Isaacman, commander of the SpaceX Polaris Dawn. This symbolized a connection between Congreve's pioneering 19th-century work—itself built upon Mysorean innovation—and contemporary space exploration, tracing a line of development from the battlefields of the Napoleonic Wars to orbital spaceflight two centuries later.

== Publications ==
- A Concise account of the origin and progress of the rocket system (1804)
- A Concise Account of the Origin and Progress of the Rocket System (1807)
- The details of the rocket system (1814)
- The Congreve Rocket System (1827, London)
- An Elementary Treatise on the Mounting of Naval Ordnance (1812)
- A Description of the Hydropneumatical Lock (1815)
- A New Principle of Steam-Engine (1819)
- Resumption of Cash Payments (1819)
- Systems of Currency (1819)

== See also ==
- Waltham Abbey Royal Gunpowder Mills
- Rotunda, Woolwich

== Notes ==
Parliament of the United Kingdom
Preceded by Benjamin Bloomfield; Sir Charles Pole	Member of Parliament for Plymouth; 1818–1828; With: Sir Charles Pole (1818) with Sir Thomas Byam Martin (1818–1828)	Succeeded by Sir George Cockburn; Sir Thomas Byam Martin
Baronetage of the United Kingdom
Preceded by William Congreve	Baronet (of Walton); 1814–1828	Succeeded by William Augustus Congreve
