= Christopher Brandon (police officer) =

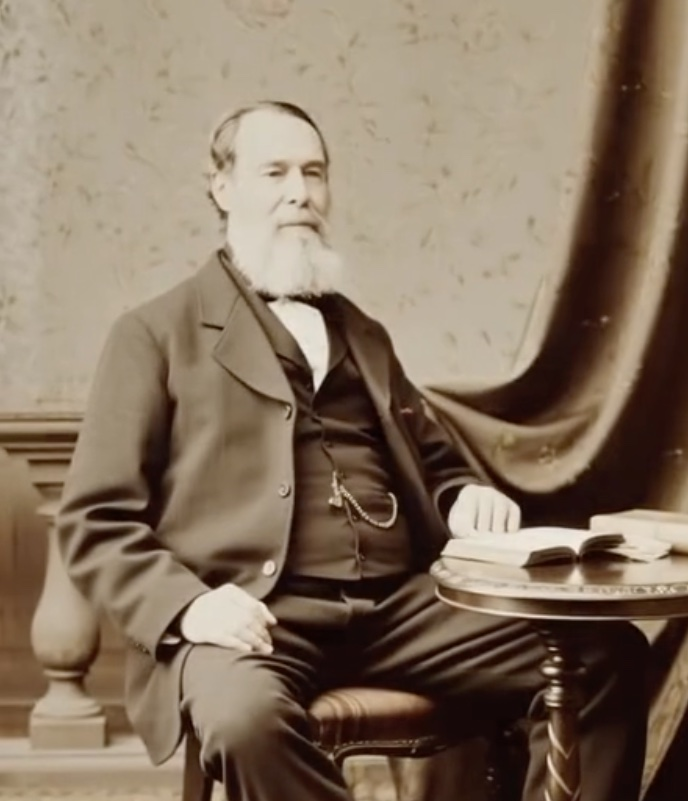
Christopher Brandon

Christopher Brandon was born into the British Navy Royal Artillery at the Eastbourne Barracks in Sussex on 16 August 1806. All that is known about his family is that his parents, Lavydike and Elizabeth Brandon, had two additional daughters, Mary and Rosehannah. Christopher went on to join the British Royal Navy and later became a Kent police Constable and ultimately Superintendent of the Dartford Constabulary.

== British Royal Navy, 1818–1834 ==
In 1818 at age 12, Brandon joined the Royal Artillery 3rd Battalion at Eastbourne, Sussex with Soldiers number 235. On 13 August 1830, Brandon became an Able Seaman aboard HMS Prince Regent in Sheerness, Scotland. Prince Regent participated in several battles off the coast of Portugal during the Liberal Wars, 1832–1833, when the British intervened on behalf of Dom Pedro I to depose his brother Miguel I.

Brandon married Sarah Ann Hill at St Luke's Church, Charlton, Kent on 20 March 1832. The couple would produce eleven children.

On 15 June 1833, Brandon would be promoted to 'Conductor of Rockets' in the ship-based Rocket Brigade aboard HMS Prince Regent while attacking Lisbon. He commanded several Congreve rocket barrages against enemy ships and targets on shore, including Lisbon itself.

== Constabulary career ==
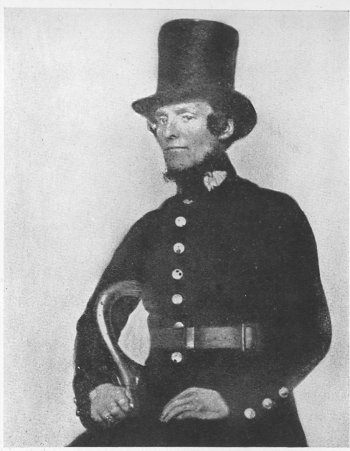
An 1850s Metropolitan Police 'Peeler'

Brandon, aged 30, joined the Kent Constabulary in Dartford 27 May 1835, with constable warrant number 10509. A look into the daily activity of Brandon in his role as Police Constable, recapturing an escaped convict on 20 February 1840.

In early 1850 Brandon was promoted to Dartford Superintendent, according to multiple newspaper articles of the time. On 7 February 1857, Brandon was promoted to Superintendent of Dartford Upper division of Sutton-at-Hone, Kent. Shortly after his promotion, on 30 April 1858, Brandon was involved in the hunt for several escaped convicts from a train at Fawkham near Dartford. There are many other newspaper articles describing his activities and court cases during his time as a policeman, from the early days through his retirement on 16 April 1872.

Brandon died on 25 January 1895, aged 88 in Dartford.

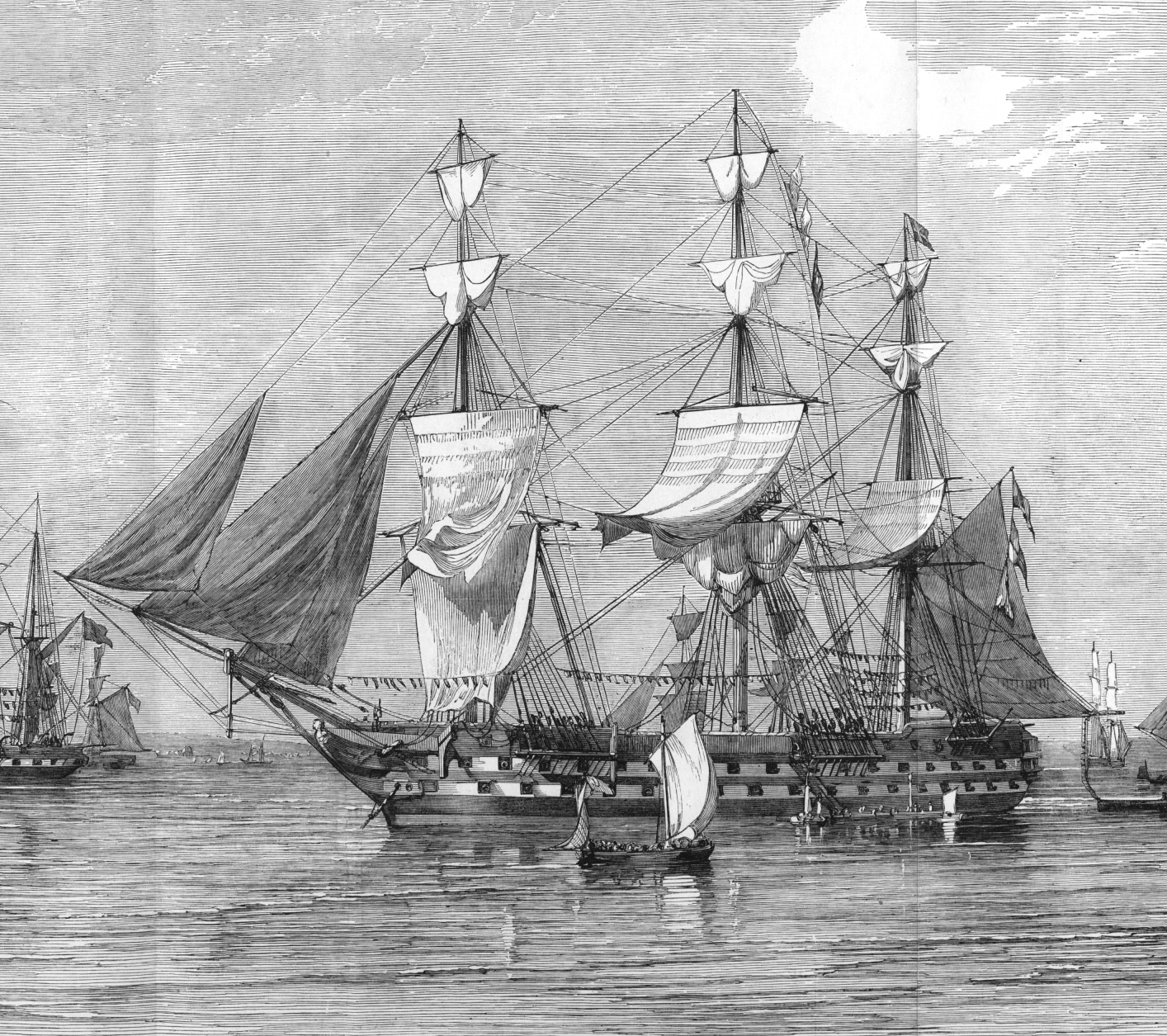
HMS Prince Regent

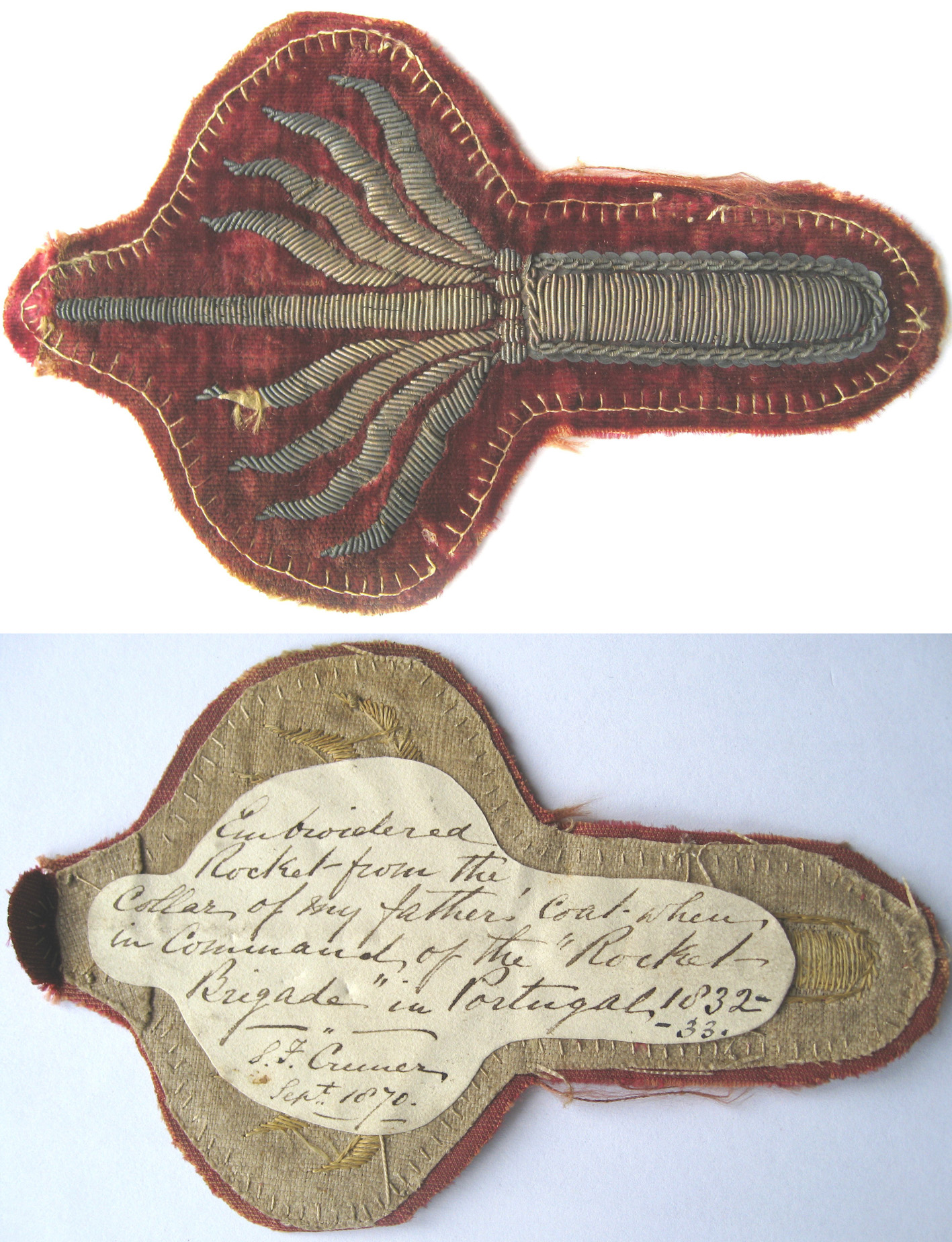
Congreve rocket patch, from Portugal campaign, 1832–33. Patch belonged to Brandon. Note this patch was flown into Earth orbit by Jared Isaacman, commander of the SpaceX Polaris Dawn spaceflight in September 2024

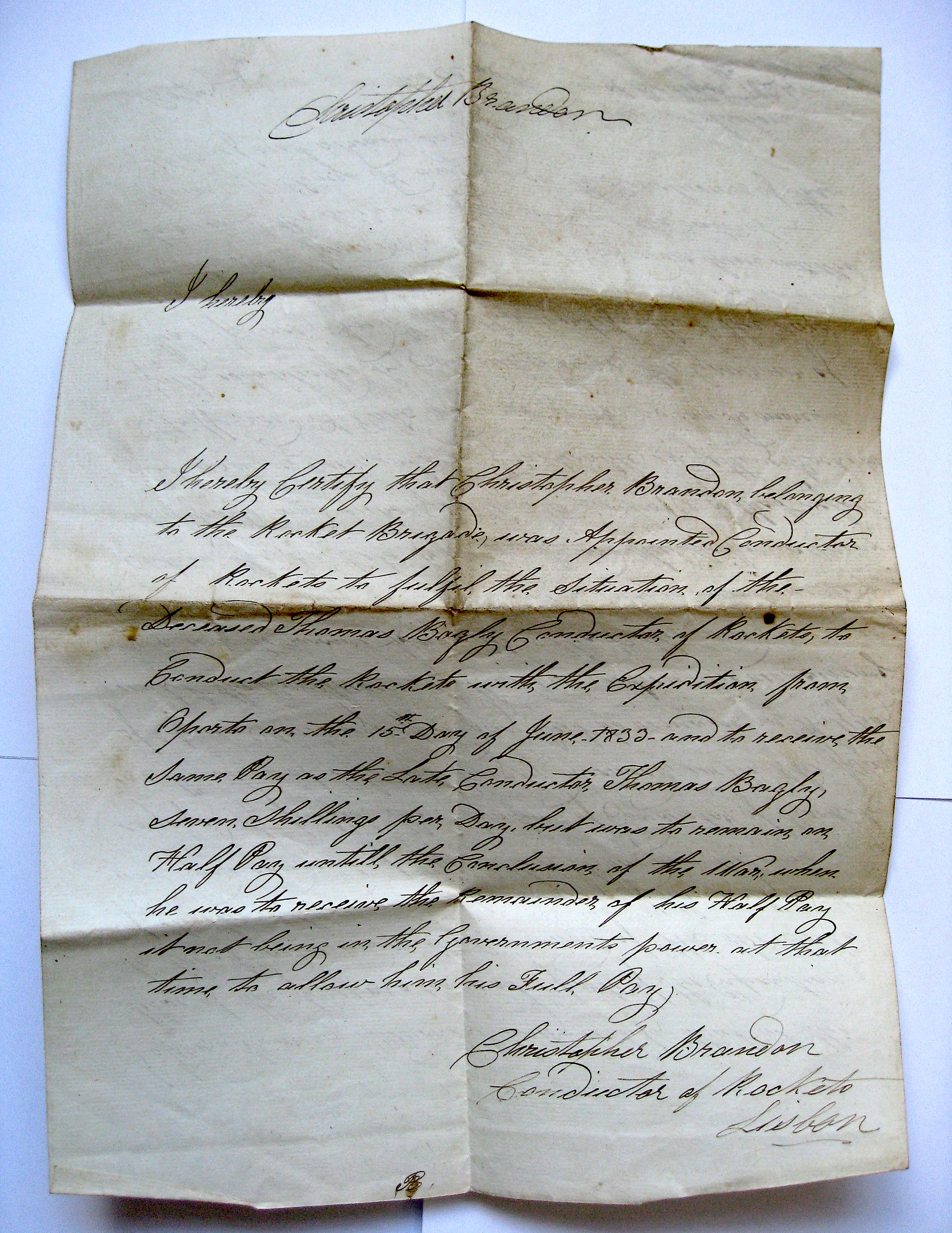
Christopher Brandon letter regarding his Rocket Brigade appointment in 1833

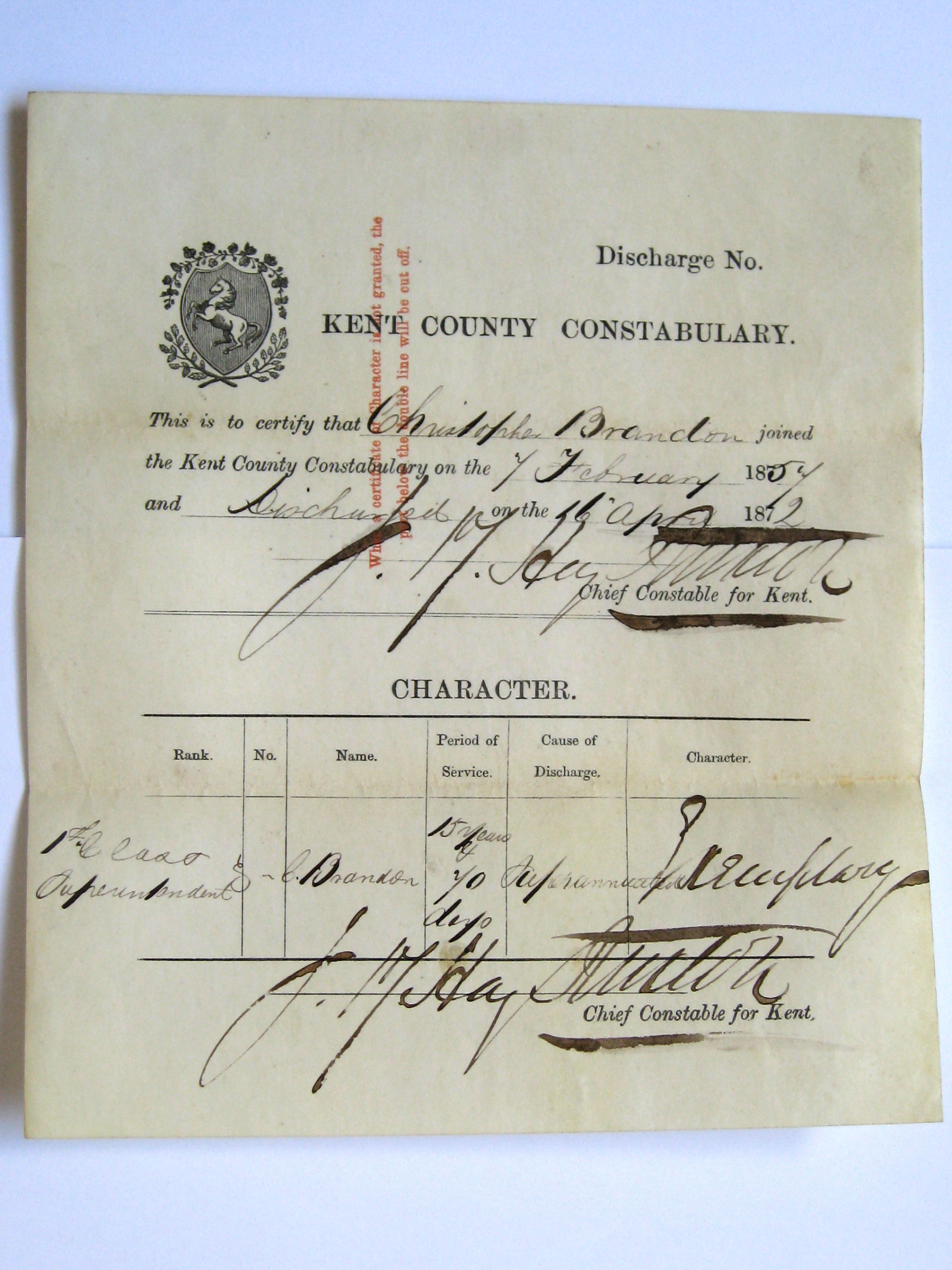
Official discharge papers for Brandon from the Kent Constabulary, 1872
