= Sir William Congreve, 1st Baronet =

British Army general

Lieutenant-General Sir William Congreve Bt
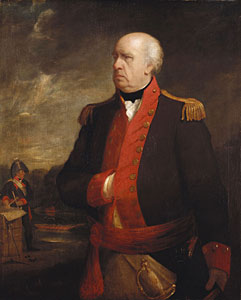
- Born: 4 July 1742
- Died: 30 April 1814 (aged 71)
- Rank: Lieutenant-General
- Children: 4, including William Congreve

Lieutenant-General Sir William Congreve, 1st Baronet (4 July 1742 – 30 April 1814) was a British Army officer who improved artillery strength through gunpowder experiments.

== Personal life ==
William Congreve was born in Stafford on 4 July 1742. He and his first wife, Rebecca Elmston, had four children together, two sons and two daughters. His eldest son, William Congreve, invented the Congreve Rocket. His second wife, Julia-Elizabeth Eyre, died aged 78 in 1831.

Congreve resided at Clockhouse (East Combe House) in Charlton from 1780-1783 and again from c.1795-1805. This property was part of the historic Eastcombe Estate between Greenwich and Charlton Village. His residence in Charlton, approximately 1.5 miles from Woolwich, enabled his daily oversight of the Royal Laboratory and Repository development. In 1782, whilst at Eastcombe, Congreve commissioned Philip Reinagle to paint a series of family portraits. These paintings, which document the Georgian interior of Eastcombe House and provide rare visual evidence of how the military elite lived in late 18th-century Charlton, were acquired by the National Gallery of Ireland after several years of negotiation.

In 1803, Congreve corresponded with Sir Joseph Banks, president of the Royal Society, regarding his responsibilities at the Royal Arsenal, demonstrating his engagement with the scientific establishment of the period.

Congreve was made a Baronet on 7 December 1812. He died on 30 April 1814. He was succeeded in his posts by his son.

== Military career ==
Congreve's formative military experience came as a lieutenant firework in Canada during the Seven Years' War (1756-63), which convinced him of the need to train the artillery how to manoeuvre heavy ordnance in difficult conditions. This battlefield experience would directly shape his later establishment of the Royal Military Repository.

By 1778 Congreve had obtained the rank of Captain and was appointed Superintendent of Military Machines. He worked out of Woolwich where he had the resources to train artillerymen. Sir William advocated government-run gunpowder mills, arguing that the privately owned concerns "have had such a prodigious profit allowed them" and yet the merchants left the job in the hands of "artful but ignorant Foremen, who probably made a very considerable profit by their Masters' inattention". As during the Seven Years' War England had become increasingly concerned about the low standard of their gunpowder, the government was convinced to purchase an additional set of powder mills instead of farming out production to powder merchants. The Faversham Mill was purchased in 1759, followed by Waltham Abbey in 1787 and Ballincollig in 1804.

Sir William became the deputy comptroller of the Woolwich Royal Laboratory in 1783, with control over the Faversham and Waltham Abbey mills. In January 1784, the 3rd Duke of Richmond became Master-General of the Ordnance, making him Congreve's superior officer and overseeing his work at Woolwich until Richmond's dismissal in 1795. In 1789, then-Major Congreve was appointed as comptroller. Author Brenda Buchanan asserts, that during his time in these positions, he oversaw three major changes in the manufacturing of gunpowder, being "the substitution of edge runner mills for stamping mills ..., the production of charcoal by low-temperature distillation in closed iron cylinders, and the employment of screw presses for compacting powder into cakes." In this role he also implemented the manufacture of two different kinds of powder, one for muskets and one for canons. Congreve believed that the different powders led to an increase in ballistic force. However Steele and Doorland have suggested that the perceived increase in strength may have come from better quality construction materials.

Congreve oversaw the establishment of two new facilities at Portsmouth and Plymouth which were dedicated to revitalizing damp or lumpy powder, as the procedure for fixing such issues was quicker than the process for making new powder. This resulted in an improved method of extracting saltpetre and consequently higher quality gunpowder.

== Royal Military Repository ==
In 1778, King George III instructed Lord Townshend, the Master-General of the Ordnance, to establish a "Repository for Military Machines" to provide improved training in the science and practice of artillery for officers and soldiers of the Royal Artillery. Congreve was appointed as the first Commandant of the Royal Military Repository and immediately began laying the foundations of what would become an historic artillery collection whilst transforming Royal Artillery training. Beyond practical training, Congreve conceived of forming "as extensive a collection as possible of everything tending to improve the science and practice of artillery, and to explain its progress," demonstrating an institutional ambition that would shape British military education.

The Repository was initially housed in a long two-storey building alongside the Carriage Works at the Royal Arsenal (then known as The Warren) in Woolwich. Cannons used for field training were stored on the ground floor whilst smaller items and models used for teaching purposes were displayed upstairs. This teaching collection established by Congreve in 1778 would form the nucleus of what eventually became the Royal Artillery Museum collection. Following a serious fire in 1802, the collection was moved to the Royal Military Academy's former premises when the Academy relocated to Woolwich Common in 1806.

The collection continued to grow and in 1820, after Congreve's death, his son William Congreve secured the Rotunda building for the Repository collection, where it first opened to the public as one of Britain's earliest free public museums. The collection founded by the elder Congreve would eventually evolve into Firepower – The Royal Artillery Museum (opened 2001, closed 2016) and continues today as the Royal Artillery Museum collection.

== Family portraits ==
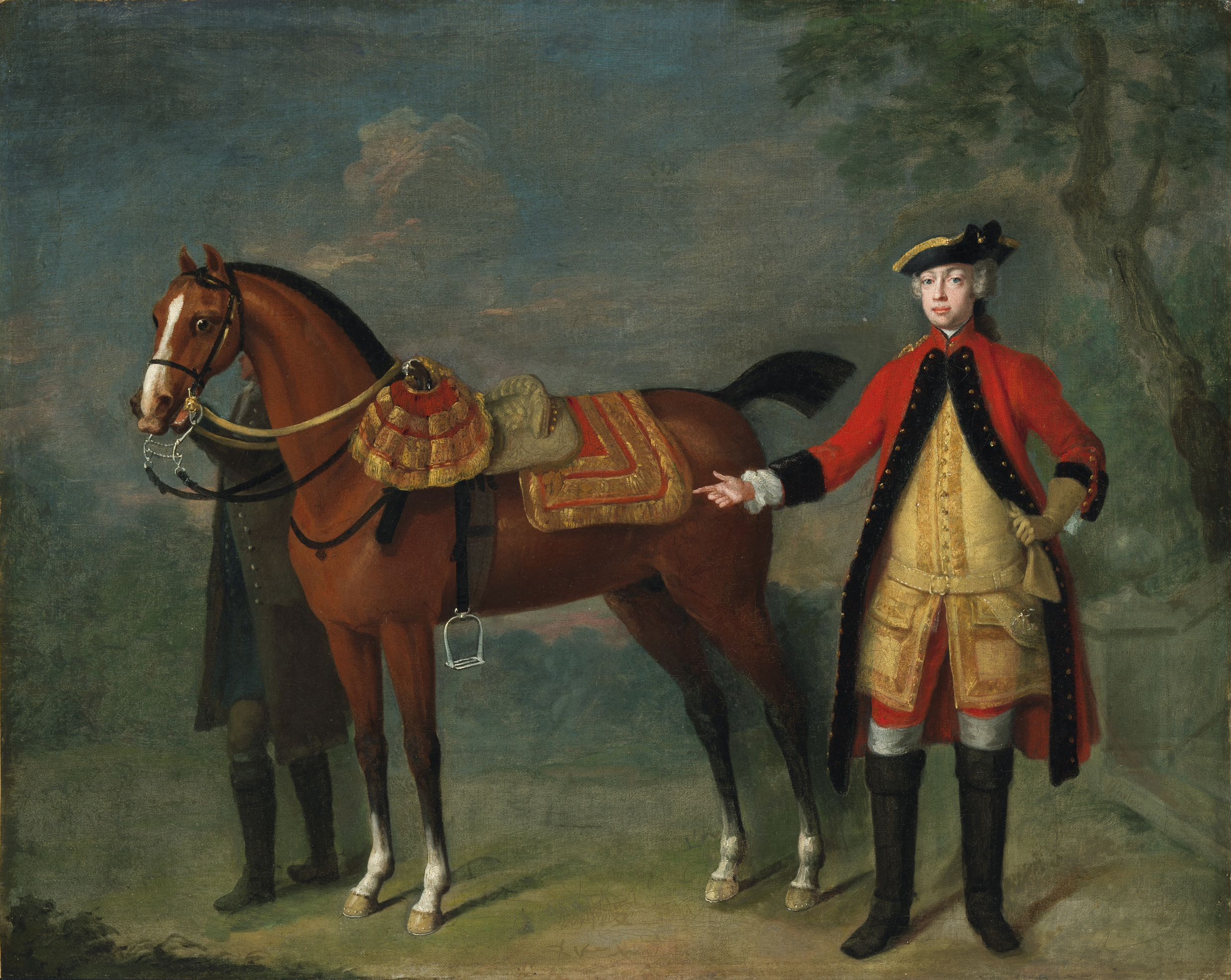
Thomas Congreve (1714-1777), father of Sir William, by Charles Phillips, 1739

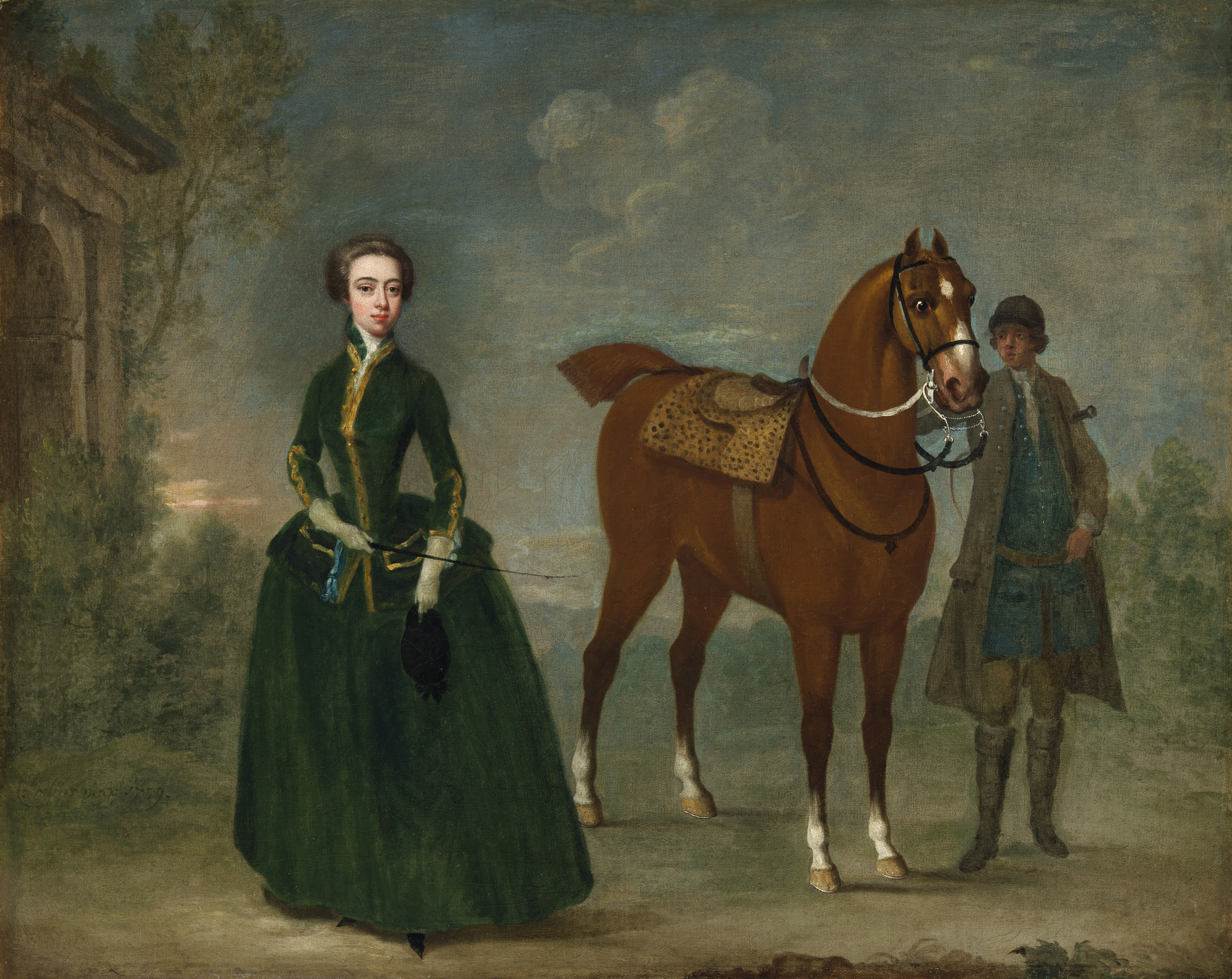
Anna Catherine Congreve (née Handasyde), mother of Sir William, by Charles Phillips, 1739

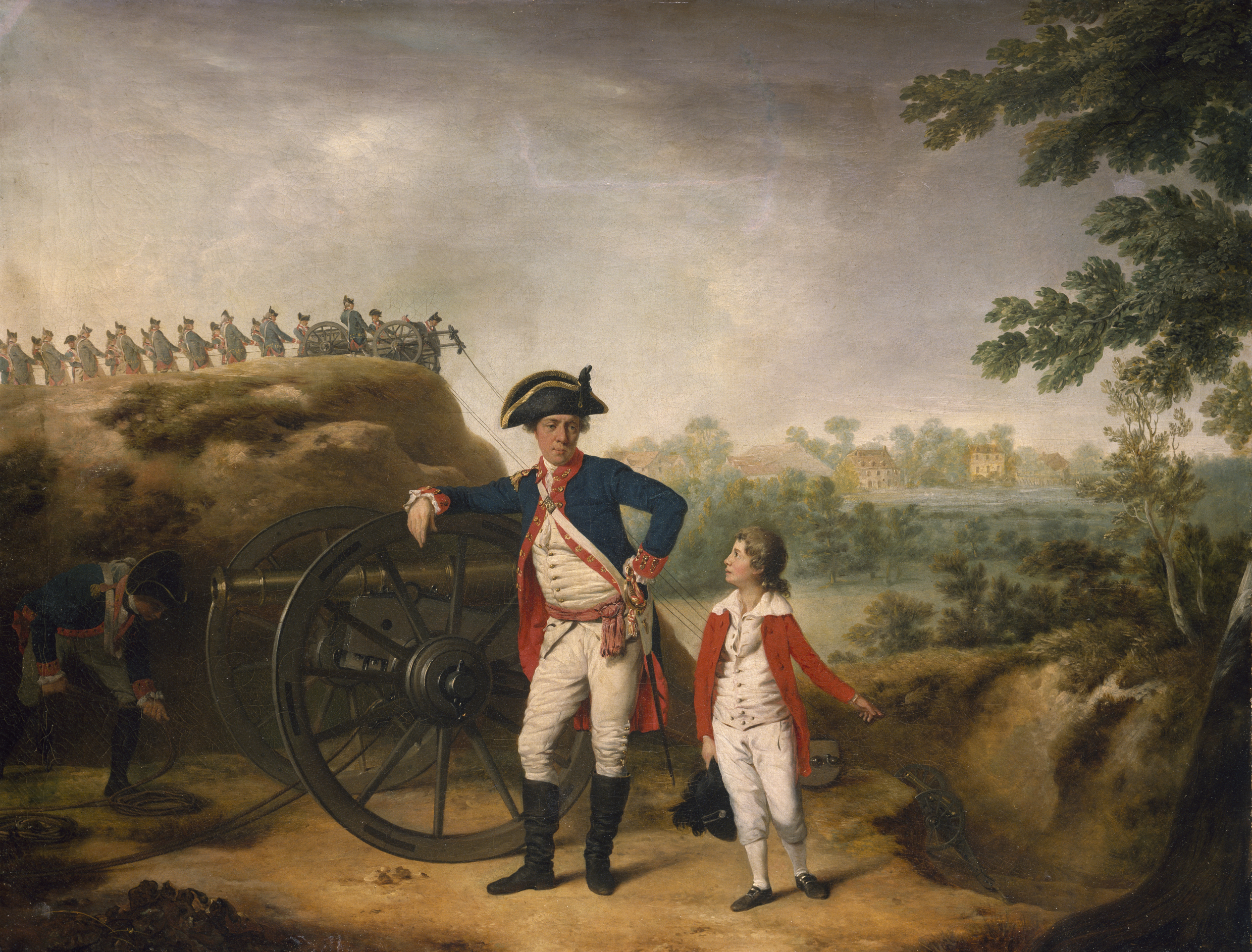
Captain William Congreve with his son William, by Philip Reinagle, c.1782

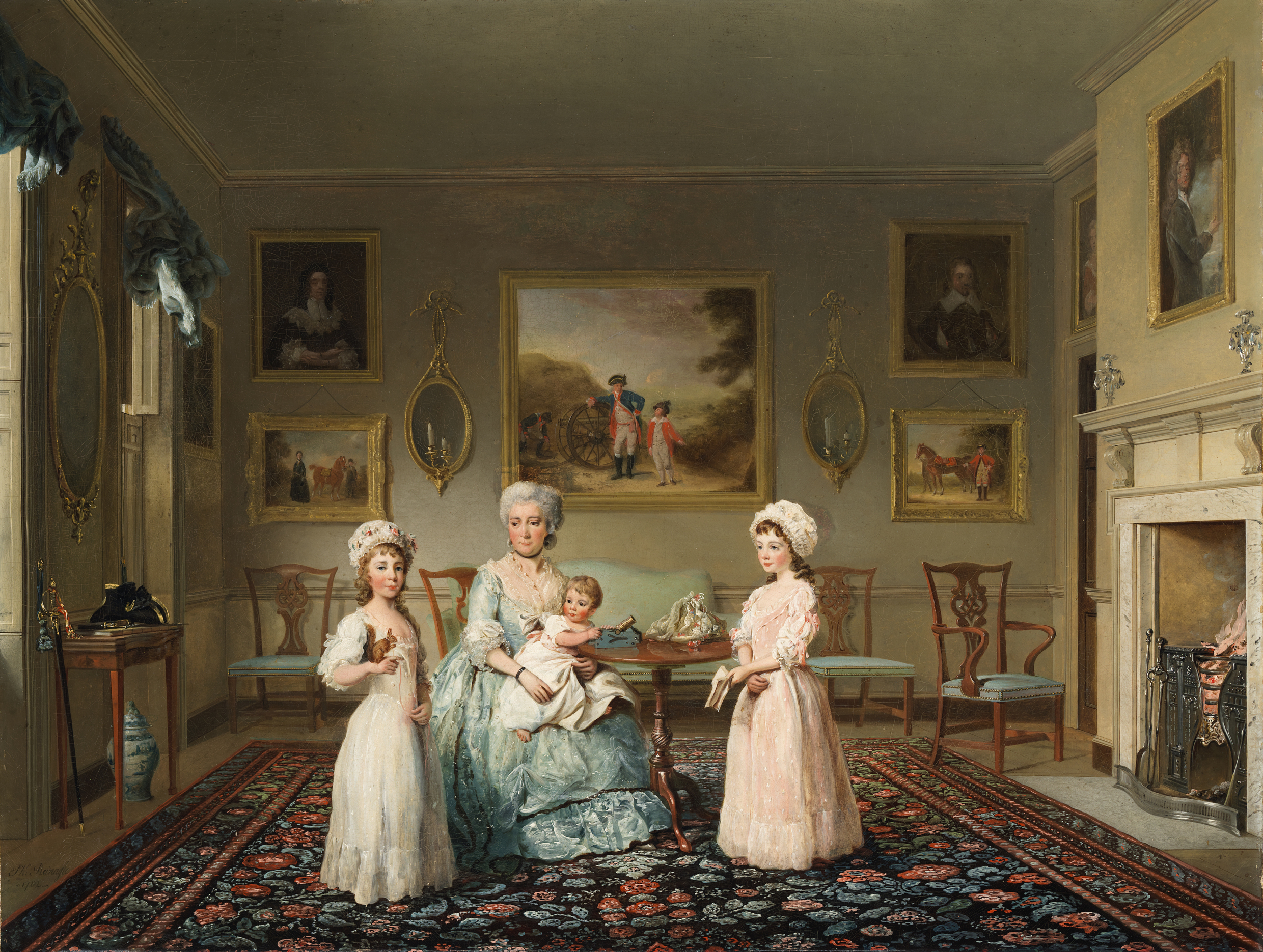
Mrs Congreve with her children, by Philip Reinagle, 1782

In 1782, Congreve commissioned Philip Reinagle to paint a series of family portraits. These included portraits of himself with his son William, and Mrs Congreve with their children. The paintings also show portraits of his parents, Thomas Congreve (1714-1777) and Anna Catherine (née Handasyde), painted by Charles Phillips in 1739, visible in the background. These paintings are now in the National Gallery of Ireland.

Baronetage of the United Kingdom
New creation	Baronet (of Walton); 1812–1814	Succeeded by William Congreve
