= Benton (surname) =

Benton is an English surname whose origin could derive from "town in the bent grass," "from the place where the bear grass grows," or "Ben's town". The name may refer to:

- Al Benton (1911–1968), American baseball player
- Andrew K. Benton (born c. 1952), American lawyer and academic administrator
- Arthur L. Benton (1909–2006), American neuropsychologist
- Barbi Benton (born 1950), American model and actress
- Bernard Benton (born 1957), American boxer
- Billy Benton (1895–1967), English footballer
- Brook Benton (1931–1988), American musician
- Buster Benton (1932–1996), American blues guitarist and singer
- Charles S. Benton (1810–1882), American politician
- Dave Benton (born 1951), Aruban-Estonian singer
- Denée Benton (born 1991), American actress and singer
- Don Benton (born 1957), American politician
- Eddie Benton (born 1975), American basketball player and coach
- Elijah Benton (born 1996), American football player
- Glen Benton (born 1967), American bass guitarist
- Grady Benton (born 1973), American football player
- Harry Benton, American politician
- Jack Benton (1875–1926), English footballer
- Jacob Benton (1814–1892), American politician
- Jeffrey Benton (born 1953), Australian cricketer
- Jerome Benton (born 1962), American musician
- Jesse Benton (born 1977), American political operative
- Jessica Benton (born 1942), British actress
- Jim Benton (born 1960), American illustrator
- Jim Benton (American football) (1916–2001), American football player
- Joe Benton (born 1933), British politician
- John Keith Benton (1896–1956), American university administrator
- Joshua Benton (born 1975), American journalist
- Keeanu Benton (born 2001), American football player
- Kenneth Benton (1909–1999), British intelligence officer
- Lemuel Benton (1754–1818), American politician
- Louisa Dow Benton (1831–1895), American linguist
- Maecenas Benton (1848–1924), American politician
- Mark Benton (born 1965), British actor
- Mary Lathrop Benton (1864–1955), Syrian-born American educator
- Michael Benton (born 1956), British paleontologist
- Morris Fuller Benton (1872–1948), American typeface designer
- Nathaniel S. Benton (1792–1869), American politician
- Nicholas F. Benton (born 1944), American journalist
- Nick Benton (cricketer) (born 1991), Australian cricketer
- Rabbit Benton (1901–1984), American baseball player
- Robert Benton (1932–2025), American film director and screenwriter
- Robert R. Benton (1924–2003), American set decorator
- Samuel Benton (1820–1864), American attorney
- Scott Benton (born 1974), English rugby union player
- Scott Benton (politician), British politician
- Susanne Benton (born 1948), Canadian actress
- Thomas Benton (disambiguation), multiple people
- Tommy Benton (born 1950), American politician
- Walter Benton (1930–2000), American musician
- Walter Benton (poet) (1907–1976), American poet
- William Benton (disambiguation), multiple people

== Fiction ==
- Jack Benton, fictional character from FlatOut 2
- Peter Benton, fictional character from ER
- Sergeant Benton, fictional character from Doctor Who

== See also ==
- Benton (disambiguation)
- Brains Benton, children's book series
