= Benn =

Benn is a surname and given name, derived from the given name Benedict. The surname originated separately in England and Germany. It may refer to:

== Surname ==
- A. W. Benn (1843–1915), British rationalist/humanist writer
- Aluf Benn (born 1965), Israeli journalist, author and editor-in-chief of the Israeli national daily newspaper Haaretz
- Anthony Benn (disambiguation), several people
- Arrelious Benn (born 1988), American football player
- Arthur Shirley Benn, 1st Baron Glenravel (1858–1937), British politician
- Brindley Benn (1923–2009), Guyanese politician
- Brittany Benn (born 1989), Canadian rugby union player
- Caroline Benn (1926–2000), British writer, wife of Tony Benn
- Concetta Benn (1926–2011), Australian social worker
- Conor Benn (born 1996), British boxer, son of Nigel Benn
- Emily Benn (born 1989), British politician, granddaughter of Tony Benn
- Sir Ernest Benn, 2nd Baronet (1875–1954), British publisher
- Gottfried Benn (1886–1956), German poet
- Hilary Benn (born 1953), British politician, son of Tony Benn
- James R. Benn (born 1949), American mystery writer
- Jamie Benn (born 1989), Canadian NHL hockey player, brother of Jordie
- Sir John Benn, 1st Baronet (1850–1922), British politician, father of Ernest Benn and William Wedgwood Benn
- Jonathon Benn (born 1967), English retired cricketer
- Jon T. Benn (1935–2018), American businessman, entrepreneur, and actor
- Jordie Benn (born 1987), Canadian NHL hockey player for the Dallas Stars, brother of Jamie Benn
- Margaret Wedgwood Benn (née Holmes) (1897–1991), British theologian and women's rights advocate, wife of William Wedgwood Benn and mother of Tony Benn
- Martin Benn, Australian chef and restaurateur
- Melissa Benn (born 1957), British writer, daughter of Tony and Caroline Benn
- Mitch Benn (born 1970), British musician and stand-up comedian
- Nigel Benn (born 1964), British boxer
- Piers Benn (born 1962), British philosopher
- Roy George Benn (1908–1967), American formerly missing person
- Sissela Benn (born 1980), Swedish actress and comedian
- Sulieman Benn (born 1981), Barbadian spin bowler
- Tony Benn (1925–2014), British politician, son of William and Margaret Wedgwood Benn
- Velta Benn (1917–2010), American pilot
- Wallace Benn (born 1947), English retired Anglican bishop
- Wayne Benn (born 1976), English football manager/coach and former footballer
- William Wedgwood Benn, 1st Viscount Stansgate (1877–1960), British politician
- William Benn (divine) (1600–1680), English ejected puritan minister

== Given name ==
- Benn Ferriero (born 1987), American ice hockey player
- Benn Jordan (born 1978), American modern jazz and electronic musician
- Benn Levy (1900–1973), British politician and playwright
- Benn Robinson (born 1984), Australian former rugby union footballer
- Benn Steil, American economist and writer
- Benn Fraker (born 1989), American slalom canoeist

== Fictional characters ==
- Mr Benn, created by David McKee

== See also ==
- Behn (disambiguation)
- Ernest Benn Limited, publishing house
