= Benn (disambiguation) =

Benn is a surname and given name

Benn may also refer to:

- Benn (English cricketer) (fl. 1830s), English cricketer
- Benn (painter) (1905–1989), Polish painter
- Benn baronets, Baronetage of the United Kingdom
- Benn family, British family that has been prominent in UK politics, government, public service, and business since the late nineteenth century
- Benn Hall, conference, seminar, exhibition, concert and party venue located in Rugby, Warwickshire, England
- Benn Skerries , small group of rocks on the island of Bouvetøya, Norway
- Mr Benn, a character, created by David McKee, who originally appeared in several children's books
- The Benn, summit in England

== See also ==
- Ben (disambiguation)
