= John Benn (disambiguation) =

Sir John Benn, 1st Baronet (1850–1922) was a British politician.

John Benn may also refer to:

- Jon T. Benn (1935–2018), American actor
- Sir John Benn, 3rd Baronet (1904–1984), of the Benn baronets

== See also ==
- Benn (surname)
