= Benton =

Benton may refer to:

== Places ==
=== Canada ===
- Benton, Alberta, also known as Benton Station
- Benton, a local service district south of Woodstock, New Brunswick
- Benton, Newfoundland and Labrador

=== United Kingdom ===
- Benton, Devon, near Bratton Fleming
- Benton, Tyne and Wear

=== United States ===
- Benton, Alabama
- Benton, Arkansas
- Benton, California
- Benton, Illinois
- Benton, Indiana
- Benton, Iowa
- Benton, Kansas
- Benton, Kentucky
- Benton, Louisiana
- Benton, Maine
- Benton, Michigan
- Benton, Missouri
- Benton, New Hampshire
- Benton, New York
- Benton, Ohio
- Benton, Columbia County, Pennsylvania
- Benton, Tennessee
- Benton, Wisconsin
- Benton (town), Wisconsin
- Benton (Middleburg, Virginia), a historic house
- Benton Charter Township, Michigan
- Benton Crossing, California
- Benton Harbor, Michigan
- Benton Hot Springs, California (ghost town)
- Benton Ridge, Ohio
- Fort Benton, Montana
- Lake Benton, Minnesota
- Utu Utu Gwaitu Paiute Tribe of the Benton Paiute Reservation, California

== People ==
- Benton (surname)
- Benton Sawrey, American politician

== Other ==
- The Benton meteorite of 1949, which fell in New Brunswick, Canada (see Meteorite falls)
- Benton fireworks disaster, a 1983 industrial disaster near Benton, Tennessee
- Benton Museum of Art ("the Benton") at Pomona College in Claremont, California
- Benton Institute for Broadband & Society

== See also ==
- Ben (disambiguation)
- Benton City (disambiguation)
- Benton County (disambiguation), any of several in the United States
- Benton Station (disambiguation)
- Benton Township (disambiguation), any of several in the United States
- Bentonville (disambiguation)
- Bentown, Illinois
- Benville (disambiguation)
- Fort Benton (disambiguation)
- Bentonite
- William Benton Museum of Art, in Storrs, Connecticut
