= Jamie Benn (disambiguation) =

Jamie Benn (born 1989) is a Canadian ice hockey player.

Jamie Benn may also refer to:

- Jamie Benn (rugby league) (born 1977), Scottish rugby league footballer

== See also ==
- James R. Benn (born 1949), American writer
- Benn (surname)
