= Bevil =

Bevil may refer to:

== People with the given name ==
- Bevil Conway (born 1974), neuroscientist and artist
- Barney Glover AO FTSE FRSN (Bevil Milton Glover; born 1958), Australian professor, mathematician, and university vice chancellor
- Bevil Granville (died 1706), English soldier, governor of Pendennis Castle in Cornwall, governor of Barbados
- Bevil Grenville (1594–1643), lord of the manors of Bideford in Devon and of Stowe in Cornwall, Royalist commander in the Civil War
- Bevil Higgons (1670–1735), English historian and poet
- Bevil Mabey (1916–2010), English businessman and inventor
- Bevil Quiller-Couch MC, decorated British Army officer
- Guilford Bevil Reed, OBE FRSC (1887–1955), Canadian medical researcher
- Bevil Rudd (1894–1948), South African Olympic athlete
- Bevil Skelton (1641–1696), British foreign envoy and diplomat
- William Bevil Thomas (1757–1825), Canadian merchant, land developer and sea captain notable
- Bevil Wooding, technologist and development strategist from Trinidad and Tobago
- John Hugh Bevil Acland, KCB, CBE, DL (1928–2006), senior British Army officer
- Peter Bevil Edward Acland, OBE, MC, TD, DL, JP, OStJ (1902–1993), British soldier

== People with the surname ==
- Brian Bevil (born 1971), former Major League Baseball pitcher
- Lou Bevil (1922–1973), professional baseball player
- Rob Bevil (1968–present), related term beviled to make someone very drunk

== See also ==
- Sir Bevil Grenville's Monument, a monument in Bath, Somerset, England
- Bevil Oaks, Texas, a city in Jefferson County, Texas, United States
- Belville (disambiguation)
- Benville (disambiguation)
- Berville (disambiguation)
