= 1904 Devonport by-election =

UK parliamentary by-election

| ← 1900 | 20 June 1904 | 1906 → |

| Candidate | Benn | Jackson |
| Party | Liberal | Conservative |
| Popular vote | 6,219 | 5,179 |
| Percentage | 54.6% | 45.4% |
MP before election
John Lockie
Conservative
Subsequent MP
John Benn
Liberal

The 1904 Devonport by-election was a Parliamentary by-election held on 20 June 1904. The constituency returned one Member of Parliament (MP) to the House of Commons of the United Kingdom, elected by the first past the post voting system.

== Vacancy ==
John Lockie had been Conservative MP for one of the seats of Devonport since the 1902 Devonport by-election. He resigned at the age of 43 and died in January 1906.

== Electoral history ==
The seat had been Conservative since he gained it in the 1902 Devonport by-election. Both Devonport seats had been Liberal from 1892-1902.

1902 Devonport by-election
| Party | Candidate | Votes | % | ±% |
|---|---|---|---|---|
| Conservative | John Lockie | 3,785 | 50.2 | +1.3 |
| Liberal | Thomas Brassey | 3,757 | 49.8 | −1.3 |
| Majority | | 28 | 0.4 | N/A |
| Turnout | | 7,542 | 84.3 | −0.8 |
| Conservative gain from Liberal | | Swing | +1.3 | |

== Candidates ==
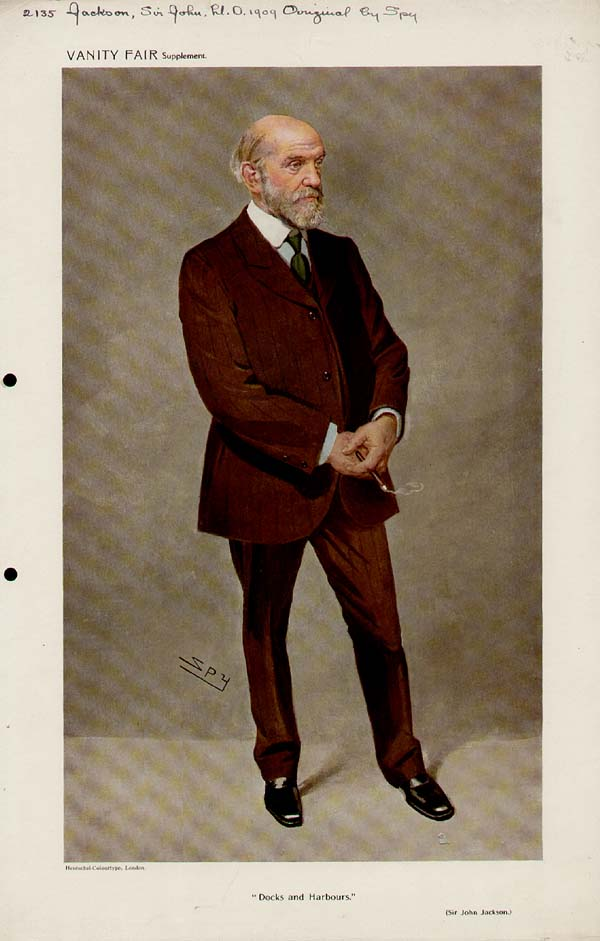
Jackson

The local Conservative Association selected 53-year-old Sir John Jackson as their candidate to defend the seat. He was a contractor for Public Works. He completed the Admiralty Docks at Keyham, Devonport.

The local Liberal Association selected 54-year-old John Benn as their candidate to gain the seat. Benn was active in the London Dock Strike of 1889, and, as an increasingly prominent London politician, was elected in 1892 as the Liberal Party candidate for St George Division of Tower Hamlets. He was narrowly defeated at the general election in 1895. As a London County Councillor, he helped introduce electric trams to London's streets in 1903. He served as Chairman of the London County Council from 1903-04.

== Campaign ==
Polling Day was fixed for 20 June 1904, just days after the previous MP resigned.

== Result ==
The Liberals re-gained the seat from the Conservatives:

Benn

Devonport by-election, 1904
| Party | Candidate | Votes | % | ±% |
|---|---|---|---|---|
| Liberal | John Benn | 6,219 | 54.6 | +4.8 |
| Conservative | John Jackson | 5,179 | 45.4 | −4.8 |
| Majority | | 1,040 | 9.2 | N/A |
| Turnout | | 11,398 | 79.3 | −5.0 |
| Liberal gain from Conservative | | Swing | +4.8 | |

== Aftermath ==
At the following General Election the result was:

General election January 1906
| Party | Candidate | Votes | % | ±% |
|---|---|---|---|---|
| Liberal | Hudson Kearley | 6,923 | 29.1 | +3.2 |
| Liberal | John Benn | 6,527 | 27.5 | +2.3 |
| Conservative | John Jackson | 5,239 | 22.0 | −2.7 |
| Conservative | F Holme-Summer | 5,080 | 21.4 | −2.8 |
| Majority | | 1,684 | 7.1 | |
| Liberal hold | | Swing | +3.0 | |
| Majority | | 1,447 | 6.1 | |
| Turnout | | 23,769 | 81.4 | |
| Liberal hold | | Swing | +2.5 | |
