= Benn family =

British family prominent in UK politics

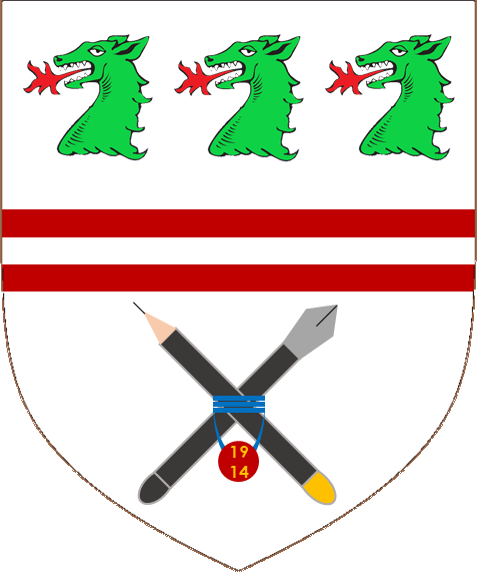
Coat of arms of Viscount Stansgate, title held by the Benn family

The Benn family is a British family that has been prominent in UK politics, government, public service, and business since the late nineteenth century.

- Rev. Julius Benn (c. 1826–1883), Congregational minister
  - Sir John Benn, 1st Baronet (1850–1922), Liberal MP 1892–1910
    - Sir Ernest Benn, 2nd Baronet (1875-1954), civil servant and later a political writer and publisher
      - Sir John Andrews Benn, 3rd Baronet (1904–1984)
        - Sir James Jonathan Benn, 4th Baronet (1933–2023)
          - Sir Robert Ernest Benn, 5th Baronet (born 1963)
            - Alastair Frederick Benn (born 1995), heir apparent to the Baronetcy
    - William Wedgwood Benn, 1st Viscount Stansgate (1877–1960), Liberal and Labour MP, 1906–1942. Secretary of State for India 1929–1931 Secretary of State for Air 1945–1946, married Margaret Benn, Viscountess Stansgate
      - Anthony Wedgwood Benn, 2nd Viscount Stansgate (1925–2014), Labour MP 1950–2001. Postmaster General 1964–1966 Minister of Technology 1966–1970 Secretary of State for Industry 1974–1975 Secretary of State for Energy 1975–1979, married Caroline Benn, Viscountess Stansgate
        - Stephen Wedgwood Benn, 3rd Viscount Stansgate (born 1951), Director of Parliamentary Affairs for the Royal Society of Biology
          - Hon. Emily Wedgwood Benn, (born 1989), Labour Parliamentary Candidate
          - Hon. Daniel Wedgwood Benn, (born 1991), heir apparent to the Viscountcy
        - The Right Hon. Hilary Wedgwood Benn (born 1953), Labour MP, 1999-present. Secretary of State for International Development 2003–2007 Secretary of State for Environment, Food and Rural Affairs
        - The Hon. Melissa Benn (born 1957), journalist, novelist and campaigner
      - The Hon. David Julian Wedgwood Benn (1928–2017), BBC producer and Russian specialist
        - Piers Benn (born 1962), philosopher
  - William Rutherford Benn (1855-1921), journalist, translator and murderer
    - Dame Margaret Rutherford (1892-1972), actress, married Stringer Davis

== See also ==
- Benn Baronets, of The Old Knoll
- Viscount Stansgate
- Ernest Benn Limited
