= Bentonville =

Bentonville may refer to:

- Bentonville, Arkansas
  - Downtown Bentonville, Bentonville, Arkansas, United States
  - Bentonville Municipal Airport (KVBT, VBT), Benton County, Arkansas, United States
  - Bentonville Train Station, Bentonville, Arkansas, United States
- Bentonville, Indiana, unincorporated community in central Posey Township
- Bentonville, North Carolina, former town near Four Oaks
  - Battle of Bentonville, American Civil War battle fought in the former town of Bentonville, North Carolina
    - Bentonville Battlefield, the Bentonville Battleground State Historic Site
- Bentonville, Ohio, unincorporated community in Adams County, Ohio
- Bentonville, Texas, unincorporated community in Jim Wells County, Texas
- Bentonville, Virginia, unincorporated community in Warren County, Virginia

== See also ==
- Bentonville High School, Bentonville, Arkansas, United States
- Bentonville School District, Benton County, Arkansas, United States
- Benton (disambiguation)
- Benton City (disambiguation)
- Benton Station (disambiguation)
- Fort Benton (disambiguation)
