= Ben (disambiguation) =

Ben is a given name, either as a formal name in its own right, or as a shortened version of various given names.

Ben, Ben's, Bens, or BEN may also refer to:

== Places ==
- Ben, Burkina Faso, a city
- Ben, County Westmeath, St. Feighin's, Ireland
- Ben, Iran, a city
- Benin, UNDP country code
- Ben District, Iran
- Ben is Gaelic for "mountain", as in Ben Nevis and some other mountains and hills of Scotland and Ireland
- Bens Peak, a summit in Nevada, US

== Arts and entertainment ==
=== Music ===
- Ben (Jorge Ben album), 1972
- Ben (Macklemore album), 2023
- Ben (Michael Jackson album), 1972
- "(Ben)", a song by Avail from 4am Friday
- "BEN" (song), 2012, by Adair Lion
- "Ben" (song), by Michael Jackson for the 1972 film Ben

=== People ===
- Ben (German singer), Bernhard AML Blümel
- Ben (South Korean singer), Lee Eun-young (born 1991)
- The Bens, musical trio Ben Lee, Ben Folds and Ben Kweller
- Zehava Ben, Israeli singer

=== Film and television ===
- Ben, 2018 French TV series directed by Akim Isker
- Ben (1972 film), an American horror film
- Ben (2015 film), a Malayalam children's film
- Ben 10, TV series about cartoon character Ben Tennyson
- BEN Television, British channel
- Kylo Ren, born Ben Solo, in Star Wars

=== Comics ===
- Ben (comic strip)

== Business ==
- Ben NL, a Dutch virtual mobile network
- Bens De Luxe Delicatessen & Restaurant, Montreal, Canada
- Ben's Kosher Deli, NY and Florida
- Franklin Templeton Investments, NYSE symbol

== Codes ==
- Bengali language, ben, ISO 639 alpha-3 code
- Benin's ISO 3-letter country code
- Benalla railway station, Australia
- Benina International Airport, Benghazi, Libya, IATA code
- Bentleigh railway station, Melbourne

== Other uses ==
- Ben (Armenian letter), a letter of the Armenian alphabet
- Ben (Hebrew), "son", in names
- BEN domain, a protein domain
- Benefactive case in grammar

== See also ==
- Behn (disambiguation)
- Ben Drowned, serial game
- Benjamin (disambiguation)
- Benn (disambiguation)
- Benny (disambiguation)
- Big Ben
