= 263 (disambiguation) =

263 was a year.

263 may also refer to:

== Dates and numbers ==
- 263 (number)
- 263 BC

== Military ==
- No. 263 Squadron RAF
- VMM-263, United States Marine Corps Marine Medium Tiltrotor Squadron
- HMM-263, former name of VMM-263
- Messerschmitt Me 263, World War II fighter aircraft
- USS Benton County (LST-263), a tank landing ship from World War II
- USS Laub (DD-263), destroyer from World War II, later the Royal Navy's HMS Burwell
- HMCS Yukon (DDE 263), Canadian destroyer

== Highways ==
=== United States ===
- Alabama State Route 263
- California State Route 263
- Florida State Road 263
- New York State Route 263
- Pennsylvania Route 263
- Virginia State Route 263

=== Canada ===
- Quebec Route 263
- Saskatchewan Highway 263

== Miscellaneous ==
- 263 Dresda, main belt asteroid
- H.263, video codec
