= Lewis High School =

Lewis High School may refer to a number of schools:

- Southington High School in Southington, Connecticut began as Lewis Academy and took the name Lewis High School for some time.
- Ballard-Hudson Middle School in Macon, Georgia was built in 1949 as a merger of two schools: Ballard High School, a private school with roots in Lewis High School, established in 1868 by the American Missionary Association, and Hudson High School, a public industrial high school and is part of the Bibb County School District.
- Lewis High School in Los Angeles, California is a Continuation high school.
