= Royal Agricultural Society of England =

Society; promotes the scientific development of agriculture

- Motto: Practice with Science
- Established: 1838 (188 years ago)
- Chief Executives: David Grint
- Revenue: 1,875,765 pound sterling (2024)
- Employees: 17 (2024)

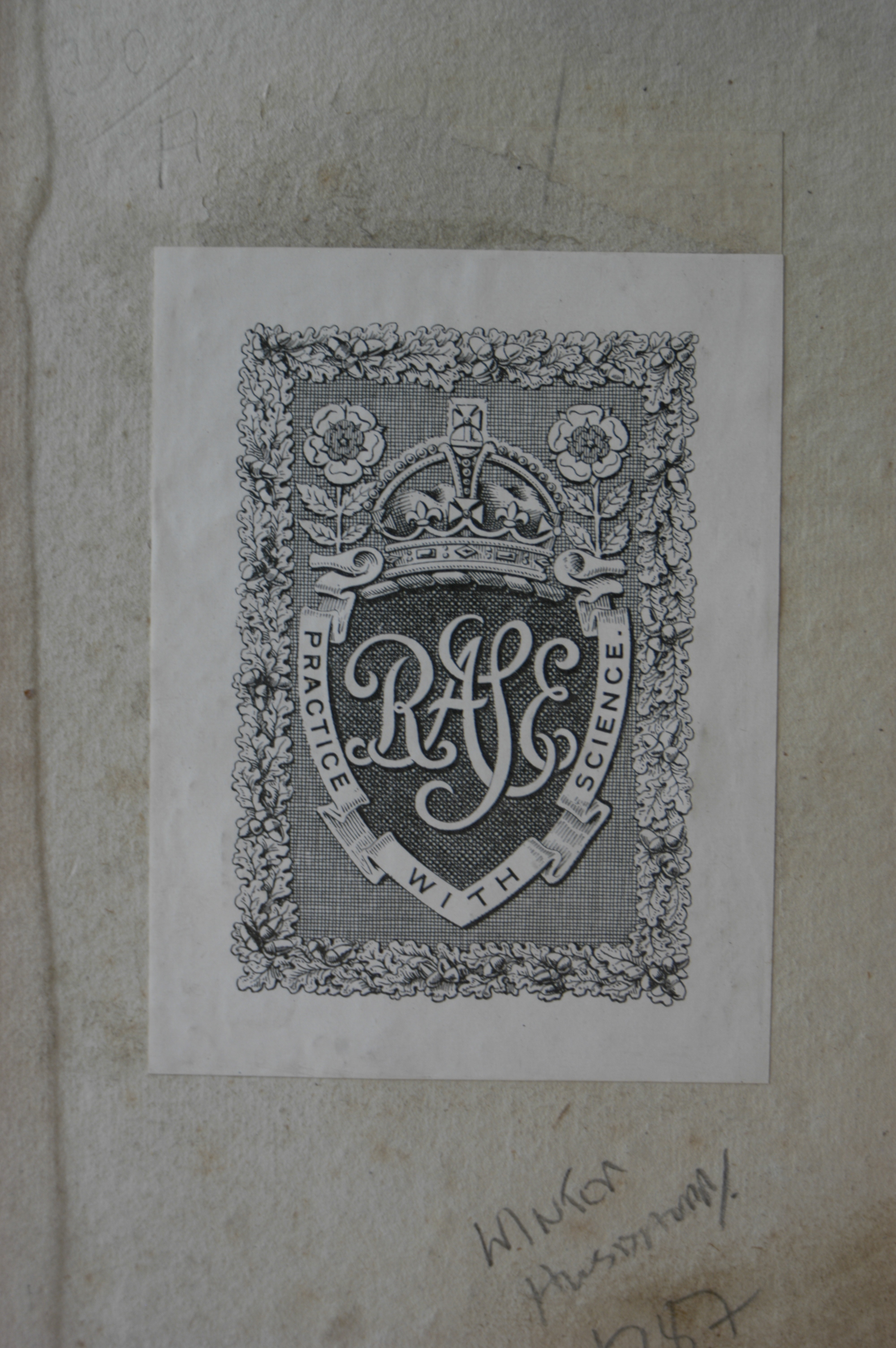
Royal Agricultural Society of England (RASE) bookplate.

The Royal Agricultural Society of England (RASE) promotes the scientific development of English agriculture. It was established in 1838 with the motto "Practice with Science" and was known as the English Agricultural Society until it received its Royal Charter and present name from Queen Victoria in 1840.

The organization's purpose was to support agricultural research, education and practice, connecting scientists and farmers. The first Royal Agricultural Show was held in 1839. The Royal became an important yearly event in Victorian life. Towns competed to host the week-long national agricultural show, which was held in a different location each year. It was widely reported about by both agricultural and general newspapers. From 1969 until 2009, the Royal Show was held at Stoneleigh Park, near Kenilworth, in Warwickshire.

From 1840 to 2002 the organization published the Journal of the Royal Agricultural Society of England. The society presents a number of awards yearly at its annual Bledisloe Day. Archives of the society are held at the Museum of English Rural Life. Additional materials are held at Stoneleigh.

== Shows ==
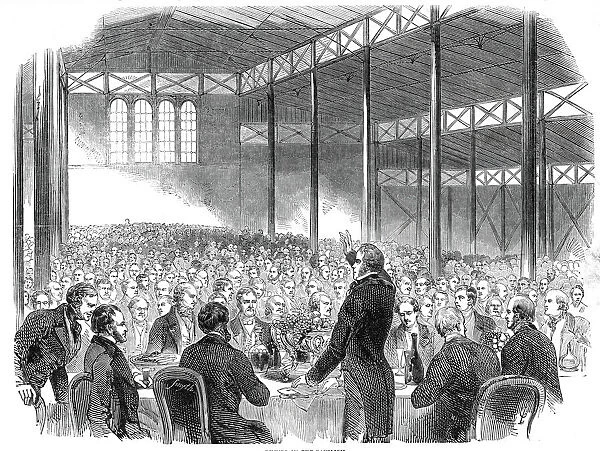
Dinner at the pavilion of the Royal Agricultural Society of England, Shrewsbury, 1845, attended by an estimated 1200 persons

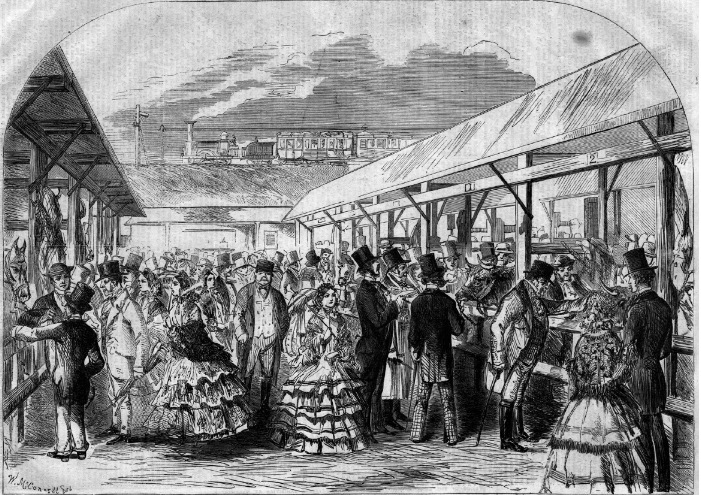
Men and women attending the Royal Agricultural Society exhibition at Chelmsford, 1856

The Royal Show, also known as the Royal Agricultural Show, was an annual agricultural show held by the Royal Agricultural Society of England every year from 1839 to 2009. The event covered all aspects of farming, food production and rural living, from British livestock to business methods and technology used in the farming industry. Over 1,000 stands, world-class livestock and equine classes attracted visitors from over 100 countries.

During its early years, the show was held in a different location each year, with towns and cities competing for the honor of hosting the event. From 1969 until 2009, the show was held at Stoneleigh Park (also known as the National Agricultural Centre or NAC) near Stoneleigh in Warwickshire. The last Royal Show took place in 2009. Since then, the Society has concentrated on transfer of scientific knowledge to agricultural practitioners.

== Journal ==
The Journal of the Royal Agricultural Society of England was sent for free to thousands of society members, with a few hundred copies additionally sold. Philip Pusey, who had also been prominent in founding the society, was the first editor of the Journal of the Royal Agricultural Society of England from its founding in 1840 to his death in 1855. The editorship then passed to H. S. Thompson, Sir Thomas Dyke Acland, 11th Baronet and Chandos Wren-Hoskyns, who served jointly from 1855-1858. Thompson was assisted by Henry Michael Jenkins from 1858-1859. There was some controversy when John Chalmers Morton was passed over for editor in 1860: P. H. Frère served as editor from 1860-1868. H. M. Jenkins returned as joint secretary-editor in 1868, and served as editor until 1887.

== Awards ==
The society makes a number of regular awards.

The Bledisloe Gold Medal for Landowners, instituted in 1958 by Viscount Bledisloe, is awarded for achievement in land management and the development of an English agricultural estate.

The National Agricultural Award, originally established in 1964 as the Massey Ferguson National Award for Services to United Kingdom Agriculture was adopted by the Royal Agricultural Society of England in 1999. It is presented to recognise outstanding contributions to the advancement of agriculture in the United Kingdom.

The Research Medal for Research Work of Benefit to Agriculture was introduced in 1954 to recognise research work of outstanding merit, carried out in the United Kingdom of benefit to agriculture.

The Excellence in Practical Farming Award (est. 1999) recognises practical farmers and farm managers who are sharing their knowledge and inspiring others.

The Practice with Science Award (est. 2011) supports research work "and innovation that results in practical advances or improvements in technical and economic efficiency on UK farms."

The Science and Technology Award (est. 2022), recognises researchers whose contributions to agricultural science or innovative technology are changing agricultural practice.

The Farm of the Future Award (est. 2023) recognises approaches that balance food production, environmental challenges, and business sustainability.

The Natural Capital Award (est. 2024) will recognise farmers who balance "sustainable agricultural practices, ecological enhancements and financial resilience".

== See also ==
- List of agriculture awards
