= Benton Station =

Benton Station may refer to:

- Benton Station, Alberta, Canada
- Benton Station, an earlier name for Benton, California, United States
- Benton Station, a village in the town of Benton, Maine, United States
- Benton Station, Tennessee, an unincorporated community in the United States
- Benton Metro station, North Tyneside, England
- Benton station ( Kentucky), in Benton, Kentucky, US

== See also ==
- Benton (disambiguation)
- Benton City (disambiguation)
- Fort Benton (disambiguation)
- Bentonville (disambiguation)
