= John Lockie =

British shipbuilder and politician

John Lockie (1863 – 26 January 1906) was a British shipbuilder and Unionist Party politician who sat in the House of Commons as a Member of Parliament for Devonport from 1902 to 1904.

== Career ==
Lockie was the son of a Glasgow merchant, and was educated at George Watson's College, Edinburgh. After commercial experience both in Glasgow and at Newcastle, Lockie in 1895 entered into business on his own account as a shipbuilder. He also established on Tyneside works for the manufacturing of tubes and engineering accessories. He was the founder of the National Industrial Association, an organization which supposedly sought to promote British trading interests by reconciling the claims of capital and labour. Following the end of the Second Boer War in 1902, he took a leading part in dispatching to South Africa a commission to inquire into and report upon trade prospects in the South African colonies.

Lockie unsuccessfully contested the Devonport constituency for the Unionist party in the 1900 general election, and kept a residence there with a view to stand again. An opening came only two years later, with the death of one of the two incumbents in September 1902, and he was the unopposed candidate for the Unionist party. Lockie had spent the intermediate years showing a great deal of attention to the dockyard and the conditions of the men working there, and after a hard-fought election he won the 22 October 1902 by-election by a wafer-thin majority of 0.4%, taking what had for many years been a Liberal seat.

Leckie was troubled by ill-health, and resigned less than two years later, in June 1904. In the following by-election the Liberal candidate re-took the seat.

Lockie died in January 1906.

Parliament of the United Kingdom
| Preceded by E. J. C. Morton; Hudson Kearley | Member of Parliament for Devonport; 1902 – 1904; With: Hudson Kearley | Succeeded by John Benn; Hudson Kearley |
