= John Jackson (engineer) =

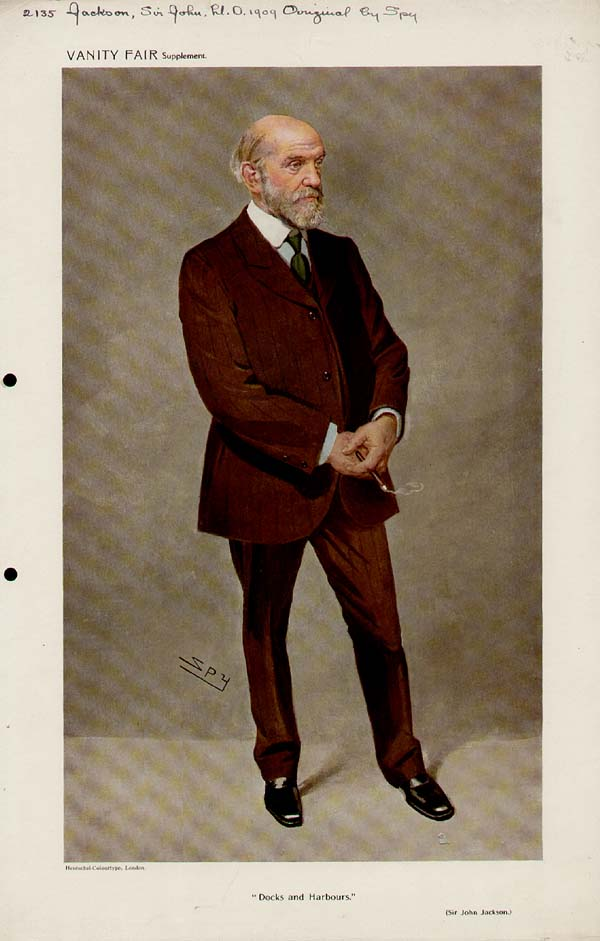
"Docks and Harbours". Caricature by Spy published in Vanity Fair in 1909.

Sir John Jackson CVO FRSE (4 February 1851 – 14 December 1919) was an English engineer who in later life served as Unionist member of parliament for Devonport, from 1910 to 1918, retiring from politics when his constituency was merged into another. He was proprietor of the major British engineering firm of John Jackson Ltd and the shipping company Westminster Shipping Co Ltd.

== Life ==
Born at 15 Coney Street in York, the youngest son of Elizabeth daughter of David Ruddock of Horbury, and her husband Edward Jackson (1789–1859), a goldsmith. His father died when he was eight years old, leaving him to be raised by his mother. He was educated at Holgate Seminary.

He was apprenticed to William Boyd, engineer in Newcastle from 1866 to 1868 before studying engineering at the University of Edinburgh under Peter Guthrie Tait. On Tait's death in 1901, Jackson endowed a research fund named after him. On graduation from Edinburgh he returned to Newcastle to work with his brother, William Edwin Jackson, a building contractor. His first major contract was Stobcross Docks in 1876.

His greatest engineering work in Britain from 1896 to 1907 was the extension of the Keyham Yard at Devonport Royal Dockyard at a cost of nearly £4 million. During this period Jackson was a member of The Plymouth Institution (now The Plymouth Athenaeum) from 1897 to 1899.

In 1894 he was elected a Fellow of the Royal Society of Edinburgh for his services to engineering. His proposers were Sir John Murray, Peter Guthrie Tait, Alexander Crum Brown, and Alexander Buchan.

His main work 1894/1895 was the Manchester Ship Canal and it was for this work which he was knighted by Queen Victoria in 1895. His company was then renamed from John Jackson Ltd to Sir John Jackson Ltd.

In later life he moved to 48 Belgrave Square in London and also bought a major country estate at Henley Park at Henley-on-Thames.

He first stood for office as the Conservative candidate in the 1904 Devonport by-election, losing to Liberal candidate John Benn. He stood for the seat again in the 1906 general election and lost again. He was finally victorious in the January 1910 general election, winning the seat again in the December 1910 general election and standing down at the 1918 general election.

In 1909 he built a railway from Arica in Chile to La Paz in Bolivia crossing the Andes en route.

Among his latter day major projects were: the dockyard at Simon's Town in South Africa in 1910; rebuilding Singapore Harbour; a major breakwater at Victoria, British Columbia; naval docks at Ferrol in Spain; a port at As-Salif; and the naval arsenal at Pula (Pola).

He died of a heart attack whilst visiting his mistress, Mrs Mabel Lydia Henderson at Hascombe Grange in Hambledon on 14 December 1919. He is buried in Norwood Cemetery.

== Family ==
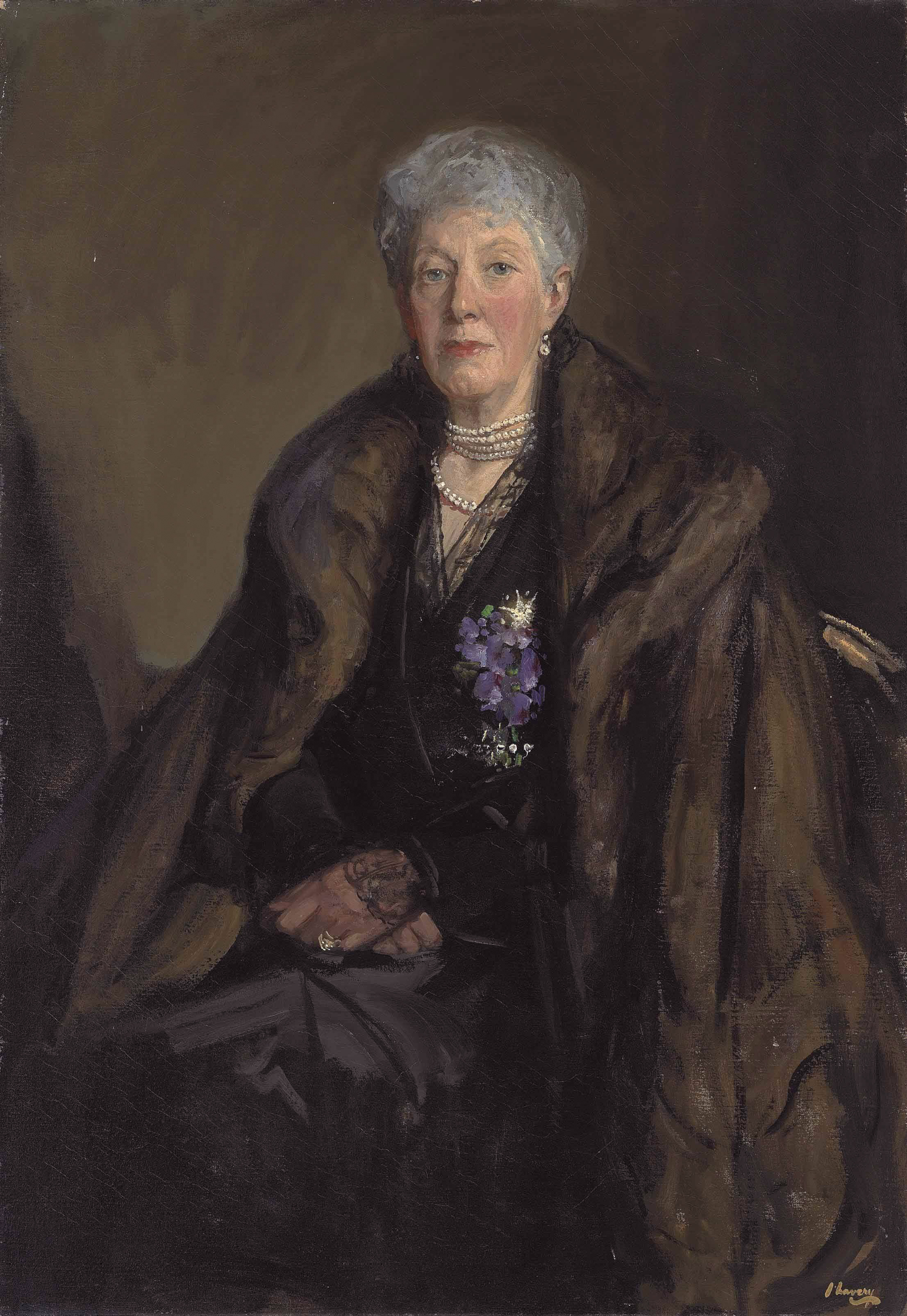
Lady Jackson (John Lavery, 1919)

In 1876 he married Ellen Julia Myers, daughter of George Myers of Lambeth. They had six daughters, only five surviving, and three sons.

Parliament of the United Kingdom
Preceded by John Benn; Hudson Kearley	Member of Parliament for Devonport; January 1910 – 1918; With: Clement Kinloch-Cooke	Succeeded by Clement Kinloch-Cooke
