= Benton City =

Benton City is the name of some places in the United States of America:

- Benton City, Missouri
- Benton City, Washington
- Benton City, Texas (ghost town)

== See also ==
- Benton (disambiguation)
- Benton Station (disambiguation)
- Bentonville (disambiguation)
- Fort Benton (disambiguation)
