= USS LST-263 =

1943 LST-1-class tank landing ship

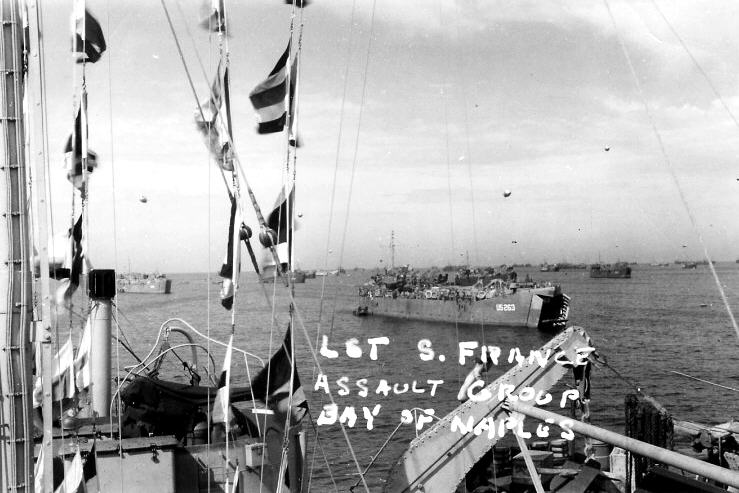
- LST-263 at anchor in Naples Bay, Italy as part of the assault group, date unknown.

History

United States
- Name: USS LST-263
- Builder: American Bridge Company, Ambridge, Pennsylvania
- Laid down: 7 September 1942
- Launched: 27 February 1943
- Commissioned: 30 June 1943
- Decommissioned: 29 May 1946
- Honors and awards: 2 battle stars (WWII)
- Renamed: USS Benton County, 1 July 1955
- Namesake: Benton County
- Stricken: 1 November 1958
- Fate: Unknown

General characteristics
- Class & type: LST-1-class tank landing ship
- Displacement: 1,625 long tons (1,651 t) light; 4,080 long tons (4,145 t) full
- Length: 328 ft (100 m)
- Beam: 50 ft (15 m)
- Draft: Unloaded: Bow: 2 ft 4 in (0.71 m); Stern: 7 ft 6 in (2.29 m); Loaded : Bow: 8 ft 2 in (2.49 m); Stern: 14 ft 1 in (4.29 m)
- Depth: 8 ft (2.4 m) forward, 14 ft 4 in (4.37 m) aft (full load)
- Propulsion: 2 General Motors 12-567 diesel engines, two shafts, twin rudders
- Speed: 12 knots (22 km/h; 14 mph)
- Boats & landing craft carried: Two or six LCVPs
- Troops: 14–16 officers, 131–147 enlisted men
- Complement: 7–9 officers, 104–120 enlisted men
- Armament: 2 × twin 40 mm gun mounts w/Mk.51 directors; 4 × single 40 mm gun mounts; 12 × single 20 mm gun mounts

USS Benton County (LST-263) was an LST-1-class tank landing ship built for the United States Navy during World War II. Named for nine counties of the United States, she was the only U.S. Naval vessel to bear the name.

LST-263 was laid down on 7 September 1942 at Ambridge, Pennsylvania by the American Bridge Company; launched on 27 February 1943; sponsored by Mrs. Charles G. Baumgartner; and commissioned on 30 June 1943.

== Service history ==
During World War II, LST-263 was assigned to the European Theater and participated in Convoy UGS-37 in April 1944 and the invasion of southern France in August and September 1944. She was decommissioned on 29 May 1946 and assigned to the Atlantic Reserve Fleet. On 1 July 1955 the ship was redesignated USS Benton County (LST-263); she was struck from the Naval Vessel Register on 1 November 1958. Her final fate is unknown.

LST-263 earned two battle stars for World War II service.
