= John Chalmers Morton =

Scottish agriculturist and writer

- Born: 1 July 1821
- Died: 1888 (aged 66–67); Harrow, London, England
- Occupations: Writer, educator
- Spouse: Clarence Hayward (m. 1854)
- Children: E. J. C. Morton
- Writing career
- Subject: Agriculture

John Chalmers Morton (1821–1888) was a Scottish agriculturist and writer.

== Life ==
The son of John Morton and his wife Jean Chalmers, he was born on 1 July 1821. He was educated at Merchistoun Castle School, Edinburgh, under his famous uncle Charles Chalmers. He then attended university lectures, took the first prize for mathematics, and was a student in David Low's agricultural classes.

In 1838 Morton went to assist his father on the Whitfield Example Farm, and shortly joined the newly formed Royal Agricultural Society. He became editor of The Agricultural Gazette on its foundation in 1844; it took him to London, and the post continued for the rest of his life.

When David Low retired in 1854 from his chair at Edinburgh, Morton ran the classes till the appointment of John Wilson. He was inspector under the land commissioners, and also served for six years (1868–74) with Edward Frankland and Sir William Denison on the Royal Commission on pollution of rivers. The commission heard his concerns on abattoir waste.

Morton died at his Harrow residence on 3 May 1888. An obituary was published in The Agricultural Gazette on 7 May.

== Works ==
Morton edited and brought out:

- A Cyclopædia of Agriculture in 1855.
- Morton's New Farmer's Almanac, London, 1856–70. Continued as Morton's Almanac for Farmers and Landowners, 1871.
- Handbook of Dairy Husbandry, London, 1860.
- Handbook of Farm Labour, London, 1861; new edit. 1868.
- The Prince Consort's Farms, London, 1863.
- An Abstract of the Agricultural Holdings ... Act, 1875, for Bayldon's Art of Valuing Rents, 9th edit. London, 1876.

He also edited Arthur Young's Farmer's Calendar, 21st edit. London, 1861–2, which he reissued as the Farmer's Calendar in 1870; 6th edit. 1884; and the "Handbooks of the Farm' Series", 7 vols. 1881–4, contributing to the series Diary of the Farm, Equipment of the Farm, and Soil of the Farm. For a time he helped to edit the Journal of the Royal Agricultural Society, and contributed to it, as well as to the Journal of the Society of Arts.

== Family ==
Morton married in 1854 Clarence Cooper Hayward of Frocester Court, Gloucestershire, daughter of Drinkwater Scott Hayward. Their son E. J. C. Morton was elected to parliament for Devonport in 1892.

== Notes ==
=== Further reading ===
- Goddard, Nicholas (1996). "A Contrast in Style: An Appreciation of Two Victorian Agricultural Journalists" (PDF). Agricultural History Review. 44 (2): 180–190. Archived from the original (PDF) on 4 March 2014.

This article incorporates text from a publication now in the public domain: Lee, Sidney, ed. (1894). "Morton, John (1781-1864)". Dictionary of National Biography. Vol. 39. London: Smith, Elder & Co.
