= Fort Benton =

Fort Benton may refer to:

- Fort Benton (Patterson, Missouri), listed on the NRHP in Missouri
- Fort Benton, Montana, a town in Montana
  - Fort Benton Historic District, a National Historic Landmark

== See also ==
- Benton (disambiguation)
- Benton City (disambiguation)
- Benton Station (disambiguation)
- Bentonville (disambiguation)
