= William Rutherford Benn =

English journalist, poet, and translator

- Born: 1855; Poplar, London, England
- Died: 1921 (aged 65–66); Dartford, Kent, England
- Occupations: Translator, journalist, merchant's clerk
- Known for: Murder of his father Julius Benn
- Children: Margaret Rutherford
- Parent(s): Julius and Ann Benn

William Rutherford Benn, later William Rutherford, (1855–1921) was an English translator and journalist, and a member of the political Benn family. In 1883 he murdered his father, the Reverend Julius Benn, and was detained at Broadmoor Criminal Lunatic Asylum until 1890, returning there in 1903 and receiving treatment until his death.

== Early life and family ==
William Rutherford Benn was born in Poplar, London, in 1855, one of eight children of the Congregational Church minister, the Reverend Julius Benn, and his wife Ann. He married Florence Nicholson on 16 December 1882 at All Saints Church, Wandsworth, south London and, in 1892, William and Florence had a daughter, the actress Margaret Rutherford.

== Patricide ==
In 1883 Benn had been on his honeymoon with his wife Florence in Paris when he suffered a nervous breakdown which it has been speculated may have been caused or exacerbated by his failure to consummate his marriage to Florence. They had been married 11 weeks when Florence brought him back home, so that his parents could care for him. However, he got worse and was admitted to Bethnal House Asylum. He was collected by his father, Julius Benn, six weeks later, when it appeared that he had recovered. His father subsequently took him to Matlock Bridge, Derbyshire, to rest. There, on 4 March 1883, using an earthenware chamber pot, he hit his father over the head, murdering him, and then attempted to cut his own throat. While in Derby infirmary receiving treatment for his injuries, he threw himself out of a window and fell 20 feet (6.1 m), injuring himself.

He was detained at Broadmoor Criminal Lunatic Asylum. He was visited by his brother, John Williams Benn, who became involved in entertaining the other patients. Benn was released from Broadmoor in July 1890 and subsequently changed his name by deed poll to William Rutherford, using his middle name as his surname.

== Career ==
In the 1881 census, when he would have been in his mid-20s, Benn was described as a "merchant's clerk". He had a facility with languages and was described by his daughter's biographer Andy Merriman as an "accomplished poet" and by David Benn as "in some way, the most civilised and educated of all the Benns". He worked as a journalist, and in the 1891 census was described as a "translator of languages". In her autobiography, his daughter Margaret described him in her (per Merriman, "somewhat hazy") autobiography as a "traveller in silks in India". Margaret's birth certificate gives her father's occupation as "East India merchant"; a few months after her birth in 1892, the family relocated to Madras, India, where William was saddened by the poverty and squalor suffered by the people. Merriman states that, per Tony Benn, William "was a shipping clerk by trade", bringing in extra money "with journalistic commissions". In Dare to be a Daniel (2012), Tony Benn said William "went to India as a journalist". Although life seemed settled, Florence, now pregnant, began to experience mental health problems which her husband, familiar with such things, noticed and sought to mitigate by returning the family to England; before they could do so, Florence hanged herself from a tree. Three months later, in spring 1895, William returned to England with Margaret, leaving her to live with an aunt at Wimbledon. Records indicate William travelled back to India, then later went to Paris before finally returning to England in 1903; during this period he sought to remarry, his brother John intervening to stop it. Although his daughter was told that her father had died of "a broken heart" after her mother's suicide, at the age of 12 she found out that he had in fact been readmitted to Broadmoor Hospital the previous year.

== Death ==
Benn died at Dartford, Kent, on 4 August 1921, having been resident at Broadmoor since 1903.
