= 1902 Devonport by-election =

Election in Plymouth, Devenport, UK

The 1902 Devonport by-election was held on 22 October 1902 after the death of one of the incumbents, Liberal politician E. J. C. Morton. The contest was won by the Conservative Party candidate John Lockie.

== Vacancy ==
The by-election in Devonport was caused by the death on 3 October of one of the sitting Liberal MPs, Edward John Chalmers Morton. There were two seats in the constituency, which had both been won by Liberals in the 1900 general election. Morton was a barrister who had held the seat since the 1892 general election, and had been re-elected in 1895 and in 1900.

== Candidates ==
John Lockie had contested the constituency for the Conservative Party in the previous election, and had kept a residence there with a view to stand again. As he was the declared candidate for the party no other names were put forward. Lockie was a shipbuilder from Glasgow, who had previously lived in Edinburgh and Newcastle before he moved south. He was the founder of the National Industrial Association, an organization which sought to promote British trading interests by reconciling the claims of capital and labour.

Several names were mentioned as candidates for the Liberal Party, including Augustine Birrell and Rufus Isaacs. By 8 October Thomas Brassey was stated to be the most likely candidate, and at a meeting the following day of the council of the Liberal party, he was adopted as such. Brassey was a volunteer officer who had recently returned from South Africa following the end of the Second Boer War. He had unsuccessfully contested the Epsom division in 1892, and the Christchurch division in 1895 and 1900. His father Thomas Brassey (later 1st Earl Brassey) was briefly an MP for Devonport in 1865.

== Issues ==
=== Education ===
Following the successful campaign in the Leeds North by-election in July 1902, the Liberal party spent much time on the government's plans for an Education Bill to replace school boards with local education authorities, which included proposals to bring church schools into the public system. Many Liberals were strongly nonconformist and the idea that Church of England and Roman Catholic schools should be funded from the rates, a form of local taxation, was anathema to them. It provided the battle slogan 'Rome on the Rates' and united the party against the government. The bill was debated in the House as the campaign in Devonport took place, and Brassey "heartily approved of the strenuous resistance ... offered by the Liberal party", making it one of the main issues of the election.

Lockie defended the government's position, stating that the bill promoted "efficiency in education and the more equitable distribution of its cost".

=== Other issues ===
Lockie used the recent peace following the Second Boer War in South Africa to mobilize government supporters in a constituency heavily influenced by military industry, stating that with a continued Conservative government would the dockyard in the city receive adequate recognition. He had spent the years after his 1900-defeat showing a great deal of attention to the dockyard and the conditions of the men working there, and was known to favor dialogue between capital and labour. Brassey worked to give attention to dockyard grievances.

Brassey raised his concern on the growth of national expenditure, attributing much of it to "insufficient control and supervision of the public departments".

Lockie promised to vote "against any tax on corn and other commodity of every-day life".

== Result ==
Lockie won the seat for the Conservatives by a wafer-thin majority of 28 votes (0.4%).

1902 Devonport by-election
Party	Candidate	Votes	%	±%
Conservative	John Lockie	3,785	50.2	+1.3
Liberal	Thomas Brassey	3,757	49.8	−1.3
Majority		28	0.4	N/A
Turnout		7,542	84.3	−0.8
Registered electors		8,946		
Conservative gain from Liberal		Swing	+1.3	

Lockie was troubled by ill-health, and resigned less than two years later, in June 1904. He died in January 1906. In the following by-election the Liberal candidate re-took the seat.
