= 2016–17 Matador BBQs One-Day Cup =

2016 Matador BBQs One-Day Cup
- Dates: 1 October 2016 – 23 October 2016
- Administrator: Cricket Australia
- Cricket format: List A
- Tournament format: Round-robin tournament
- Host(s): Sydney, Brisbane, Perth
- Champions: New South Wales (11th title)
- Participants: 7
- Matches: 21
- Player of the series: Marnus Labuschagne (QLD)
- Most runs: Cameron White (VIC) (457 runs)
- Most wickets: Cameron Valente (SA); Doug Bollinger (NSW); Pat Cummins (NSW) (15 wickets each)

The 2016 Matador BBQs One-Day Cup was the 47th season of the official List A domestic cricket competition in Australia. It was played over a three-week period at the start of the domestic season to separate its schedule from the Sheffield Shield season. The tournament was held in Sydney, Brisbane and Perth, with 13 of the 23 matches broadcast live on free-to-air television on 9Gem. In the final, New South Wales, who qualified for the final through a victory in an elimination final against Victoria, were successful over Queensland, who won every round robin game except for one.

== Points table ==
Pos	Team	Pld	W	L	T	NR	BP	Pts	NRR
1	Queensland	6	5	1	0	0	1	21	0.334
2	New South Wales	6	4	2	0	0	1	17	0.202
3	Victoria	6	3	3	0	0	4	16	1.227
4	Western Australia	6	3	2	1	0	1	15	0.024
5	Tasmania	6	3	3	0	0	1	13	0.031
6	South Australia	6	2	3	1	0	2	12	−0.332
7	Cricket Australia XI	6	0	6	0	0	0	0	−1.604

RESULT POINTS:

- Win – 4
- Tie – 2 each
- No Result – 2 each
- Loss – 0
- Bonus Point – 1 (Run rate 1.25 times that of opposition.)
- Additional Bonus Point – 1 (Run rate twice that of opposition.)

== Fixtures ==
1 October
9:30
Report

Cricket Australia XI; 5/274 (50 overs)	v	Queensland; 7/278 (47 overs)
Ryan Gibson 106 (130); Peter George 3/55 (10 overs)		Matthew Renshaw 88 (109); David Grant 2/44 (10 overs)

Queensland won by 3 wickets
Allan Border Field, Brisbane
Umpires: Shawn Craig and Michael Graham-Smith
Player of the match: Ryan Gibson (Cricket Australia XI)

- Cricket Australia XI won the toss and elected to bat.
- Jake Carder, Brendan Doggett and Ryan Gibson (Cricket Australia XI) all made their List A debuts.

2 October
11:30
Report

Western Australia; 9/242 (50 overs)	v	South Australia; 242 (48.4 overs)
Adam Voges 51 (60); Cameron Valente 3/40 (10 overs)		Alex Carey 75 (86); Nathan Rimmington 4/34 (10 overs)

Match tied
WACA, Perth
Umpires: Greg Davidson and Paul Wilson
Player of the match: Alex Carey (South Australia)

- South Australia won the toss and elected to field.
- Wes Agar, Nick Benton, Cameron Valente and Jake Weatherald (South Australia) all made their List A debuts.

3 October
9:30
Report

Queensland; 5/158 (35.5 overs)	v	Tasmania; 3/114 (19.3 overs)
Marnus Labuschagne 51 (57); Cameron Boyce 2/22 (5.5 overs)		Tim Paine 34 (38); Michael Neser 2/29 (6 overs)

Queensland won by 1 run (D/L method)
Allan Border Field, Brisbane
Umpires: Tony Wilds and Shawn Craig
Player of the match: Marnus Labuschagne (Queensland)

- Tasmania won the toss and elected to field.
- Beau Webster (Tasmania) made his List A debut.

5 October
9:30
Report

Cricket Australia XI; 9/236 (50 overs)	v	Tasmania; 2/239 (39.3 overs)
James Bazley 45 (52); Xavier Doherty 3/34 (10 overs)		Tim Paine 101* (98); Brendan Doggett 1/47 (8.3 overs)

Tasmania won by 8 wickets
Allan Border Field, Brisbane
Umpires: Michael Graham-Smith and Tony Wilds
Player of the match: Tim Paine (Tasmania)

- Tasmania won the toss and elected to field.

5 October
11:30
Report

Victoria; 5/343 (50 overs)	v	South Australia; 208 (42.4 overs)
Cameron White 145 (130); Wes Agar 2/71 (10 overs)		Cameron Valente 100 (102); Michael Beer 3/44 (10 overs)

Victoria won by 135 runs
WACA, Perth
Umpires: Simon Fry and Paul Wilson
Player of the match: Cameron White (Victoria)

- South Australia won the toss and elected to field.
- Jackson Coleman (Victoria) made his List A debut.
- Michael Beer (Victoria) took a hat-trick.

6 October
11:30
Report

Western Australia; 6/221 (38 overs)	v	Queensland; 5/222 (36.5 overs)
Adam Voges 85 (80); Luke Feldman 2/30 (7 overs)		Joe Burns 78* (83); Jason Behrendorff 1/34 (7 overs)

Queensland won by 5 wickets
WACA, Perth
Umpires: Geoff Joshua and Sam Nogajski
Player of the match: Joe Burns (Queensland)

- Western Australia won the toss and elected to bat.
- Match reduced to 38 overs per side due to rain.

7 October
10:30
Report

New South Wales; 6/328 (50 overs)	v	Cricket Australia XI; 6/324 (50 overs)
Moisés Henriques 164* (135); Xavier Bartlett 2/47 (10 overs)		Ryan Gibson 97 (104); Pat Cummins 4/70 (9 overs)

New South Wales won by 4 runs
Hurstville Oval, Sydney
Umpires: Gerard Abood and Ashley Barrow
Player of the match: Moisés Henriques (New South Wales)

- Cricket Australia XI won the toss and elected to field.
- Ben Dwarshuis (New South Wales) made his List A debut.

8 October
11:30
Report

Western Australia; 6/190 (28 overs)	v	Victoria; 9/98 (18 overs)
Michael Klinger 87 (78); Glenn Maxwell 2/18 (2 overs)		Cameron White 24 (29); Andrew Tye 3/10 (3 overs)

Western Australia won by 41 runs (D/L method)
WACA, Perth
Umpires: Greg Davidson and Sam Nogajski
Player of the match: Andrew Tye (Western Australia)

- Victoria won the toss and elected to field.

9 October
10:30
Report

Tasmania; 242 (50 overs)	v	New South Wales; 227 (49.1 overs)
Alex Doolan 67 (82); Gurinder Sandhu 3/57 (9 overs)		Daniel Hughes 73 (88); Cameron Boyce 4/55 (9 overs)

Tasmania won by 15 runs
Hurstville Oval, Sydney
Umpires: Mick Martell and John Ward
Player of the match: Simon Milenko (Tasmania)

- New South Wales won the toss and elected to field.

9 October
11:30
Report

South Australia; 9/199 (50 overs)	v	Queensland; 5/201 (33.2 overs)
Callum Ferguson 43 (47); Michael Neser 4/41 (10 overs)		Marnus Labuschagne 73* (64); Cameron Valente 3/30 (5.2 overs)

Queensland won by 5 wickets
WACA, Perth
Umpires: Phillip Gillespie and Geoff Joshua
Player of the match: Michael Neser (Queensland)

- Queensland won the toss and elected to field.

11 October
10:30
Report

Cricket Australia XI; 153 (37.4 overs)	v	Victoria; 6/154 (21.4 overs)
Arjun Nair 67 (88); Fawad Ahmed 4/43 (10 overs)		Marcus Harris 36 (29); Arjun Nair 3/53 (8 overs)

Victoria won by 4 wickets
North Sydney Oval, Sydney
Umpires: Gerard Abood and Simon Lightbody
Player of the match: Arjun Nair (Cricket Australia XI)

- Victoria won the toss and elected to field.

12 October
10:30
Report

New South Wales; 208 (48.3 overs)	v	South Australia; 4/209 (39.2 overs)
Ed Cowan 50 (76); Wes Agar 3/38 (9 overs)		Callum Ferguson 73 (77); Doug Bollinger 3/35 (9.2 overs)

South Australia won by 6 wickets
Drummoyne Oval, Sydney
Umpires: Ashley Barrow and Greg Davidson
Player of the match: Callum Ferguson (South Australia)

- New South Wales won the toss and elected to bat.
- Michael Cormack (South Australia) made his List A debut.

13 October
10:30
Report

Tasmania; 7/210 (50 overs)	v	Victoria; 2/211 (34.2 overs)
Alex Doolan 87* (82); Glenn Maxwell 2/17 (6 overs)		Cameron White 117* (104); Hamish Kingston 1/39 (8 overs)

Victoria won by 8 wickets
North Sydney Oval, Sydney
Umpires: Gerard Abood and Phillip Gillespie
Player of the match: Cameron White (Victoria)

- Tasmania won the toss and elected to bat.

14 October
2:30 (D/N)
Report

Queensland; 172 (47.1 overs)	v	New South Wales; 6/178 (39.1 overs)
Michael Neser 47 (74); Pat Cummins 4/26 (8.1 overs)		Ed Cowan 51 (69); Ben Cutting 3/23 (9 overs)

New South Wales won by 4 wickets
Drummoyne Oval, Sydney
Umpires: Ashley Barrow and Mick Martell
Player of the match: Pat Cummins (New South Wales)

- Queensland won the toss and elected to bat.

15 October
10:30
Report

South Australia; 7/420 (50 overs)	v	Cricket Australia XI; 318 (42 overs)
Callum Ferguson 154 (113); Tom O'Donnell 3/84 (10 overs)		Jake Carder 93 (83); Cameron Valente 4/49 (7 overs)

South Australia won by 102 runs
Hurstville Oval, Sydney
Umpires: Shawn Craig and Damien Mealey
Player of the match: Callum Ferguson (South Australia)

- Cricket Australia XI won the toss and elected to field.
- Jason Sangha (Cricket Australia XI) made his List A debut.
- South Australia made the highest total in a one-day domestic cricket match in Australia.

15 October
10:30
Report

Tasmania; 8/267 (50 overs)	v	Western Australia; 6/268 (48.3 overs)
Alex Doolan 93 (104); Nathan Rimmington 2/42 (9 overs)		Adam Voges 89* (87); Hamish Kingston 3/44 (9.3 overs)

Western Australia won by 4 wickets
North Sydney Oval, Sydney
Umpires: Geoff Joshua and John Ward
Player of the match: Adam Voges (Western Australia)

- Western Australia won the toss and elected to field.

16 October
2:30 (D/N)
Report

Victoria; 309 (49.3 overs)	v	New South Wales; 4/310 (46.5 overs)
Cameron White 69 (71); Doug Bollinger 3/48 (9.3 overs)		Daniel Hughes 122 (121); Jon Holland 3/58 (7 overs)

New South Wales won by 6 wickets
North Sydney Oval, Sydney
Umpires: Geoff Joshua and John Ward
Player of the match: Nic Maddinson (New South Wales)

- New South Wales won the toss and elected to field.

17 October
10:30
Report

Cricket Australia XI; 8/147 (15 overs)	v	Western Australia; 5/159 (13.4 overs)
Sam Harper 48 (28); Andrew Tye 4/23 (3 overs)		Ashton Agar 47 (19); Arjun Nair 3/15 (3 overs)

Western Australia won by 5 wickets (D/L method)
Hurstville Oval, Sydney
Umpires: Ashley Barrow and Damien Mealey
Player of the match: Andrew Tye (Western Australia)

- Western Australia won the toss and elected to field.
- Match reduced to 15 overs per side due to rain.

18 October
10:30
Report

Victoria; 7/278 (50 overs)	v	Queensland; 7/282 (46 overs)
Aaron Finch 79 (81); Ben Cutting 4/56 (10 overs)		Marnus Labuschagne 89 (98); Marcus Stoinis 3/37 (7 overs)

Queensland won by 3 wickets
Drummoyne Oval, Sydney
Umpires: Phillip Gillespie and Mick Martell
Player of the match: Marnus Labuschagne (Queensland)

- Victoria won the toss and elected to bat.

19 October
10:30
Report

Tasmania; 7/295 (50 overs)	v	South Australia; 267 (38.4 overs)
Alex Doolan 79 (77); Adam Zampa 2/57 (10 overs)		Tom Cooper 63 (65); Cameron Stevenson 5/32 (8.4 overs)

Tasmania won by 28 runs
Hurstville Oval, Sydney
Umpires: Simon Fry and John Ward
Player of the match: Cameron Stevenson (Tasmania)

- South Australia won the toss and elected to field.
- Cameron Stevenson (Tasmania) made his List A debut.

19 October
10:30
Report

Western Australia; 207 (43.2 overs)	v	New South Wales; 2/210 (41.5 overs)
Adam Voges 62 (80); Doug Bollinger 3/26 (8 overs)		Daniel Hughes 96 (106); Ashton Turner 2/26 (4 overs)

New South Wales won by 8 wickets
North Sydney Oval, Sydney
Umpires: Sam Nogajski and Paul Wilson
Player of the match: Doug Bollinger (New South Wales)

- New South Wales won the toss and elected to field.

== Finals ==
=== Elimination Final ===
Elimination Final
21 October
2:30 (D/N)
Report

Victoria; 242 (49.3 overs)	v	New South Wales; 5/238 (46 overs)
Aaron Finch 51 (36); Pat Cummins 3/46 (9.3 overs)		Nic Maddinson 86 (98); Glenn Maxwell 2/25 (6 overs)

New South Wales won by 31 runs (D/L method)
Drummoyne Oval, Sydney
Umpires: Mick Martell and Sam Nogajski
Player of the match: Josh Hazlewood (New South Wales)

- New South Wales won the toss and elected to field.
- Rain stopped play with 4 overs remaining.

=== Final ===
Final
23 October
09:30
Report

Queensland; 186 (46.5 overs)	v	New South Wales; 4/188 (43.1 overs)
Usman Khawaja 35 (52); Nathan Lyon 4/10 (10 overs)		Moisés Henriques 85 (103); Michael Neser 3/20 (9 overs)

New South Wales won by 6 wickets
North Sydney Oval, Sydney
Umpires: Mick Martell and Paul Wilson
Player of the match: Nathan Lyon (New South Wales)

- New South Wales won the toss and elected to field.
- Harry Conway (New South Wales) made his List A debut.

== Statistics ==
=== Most Runs ===
Player	Team	Mat	Inns	NO	Runs	Avge	HS	100	50
Cameron White	Victoria	7	7	1	457	76.16	145	2	2
Moises Henriques	New South Wales	8	8	2	414	69.00	164*	1	2
Daniel Hughes	New South Wales	7	7	1	386	64.33	122	1	2
Alex Doolan	Tasmania	6	6	3	362	120.66	93		4
Callum Ferguson	South Australia	6	6	1	305	61.00	154	1	1

=== Most wickets ===
Player	Team	Mat	Balls	Runs	Wkts	Avge	BBI	SR	4WI
Cameron Valente	South Australia	6	299	251	15	16.73	4/49	19.9	1
Pat Cummins	New South Wales	6	340	279	15	18.60	4/26	22.6	2
Doug Bollinger	New South Wales	8	437	342	15	22.80	3/26	29.1	
Andrew Tye	Western Australia	6	256	251	12	20.91	4/23	21.3	1
Arjun Nair	Cricket Australia XI	5	246	250	11	22.72	3/15	22.3	
Trent Copeland	New South Wales	6	300	265	11	24.09	2/23	27.2	
