= E. J. C. Morton =

British politician

- Morton

Member of Parliament (MP) for Devonport
- In office 1892–1902

Personal details
- Born: 1856
- Died: 3 October 1902 (aged 45–46) Amberley, Gloucestershire, England
- Party: Liberal
- Parent: John Chalmers Morton (father)
- Education: St John's College, Cambridge

Edward John Chalmers Morton (1856 – 3 October 1902), known as E. J. C. Morton, was a British barrister and Liberal Party politician who sat in the House of Commons as a member of parliament (MP) for Devonport from 1892 until his death.

== Biography ==
Morton was the son of John Chalmers Morton, and was educated at Harrow School and at St John's College, Cambridge, where he won a scholarship in 1879 and graduated with a Bachelor of Arts (B.A.) degree in 1880. He was called to the bar in 1885 at the Inner Temple, and practised on the North Eastern Circuit.

He was elected for Devonport at the 1892 general election, re-elected in 1895 and in 1900.

His obituary in The Times lists him as an active member of the liberal party, and a great platform speaker. He was listed in 1892 and in 1901 as secretary of the Home Rule Union.

Morton underwent an operation in early autumn 1902, and left for his sister's residence at Amberley, Gloucestershire to recover. He died there on 3 October 1902.

Parliament of the United Kingdom
Preceded by John Delaware Lewis; Lord Eliot	Member of Parliament for Devonport; 1892 – 1902; With: Hudson Kearley	Succeeded by John Lockie; Hudson Kearley
