= Terence Kearley, 3rd Viscount Devonport =

British peer

The Right Honourable The Viscount Devonport

Member of the House of Lords as Viscount Devonport
- In office 1973–1999
- Preceded by: The 2nd Viscount Devonport
- Succeeded by: House of Lords Act 1999

Personal details
- Born: 29 August 1944 (age 82)
- Education: Aiglon College; Selwyn College; Newcastle University
- Occupation: Architect

Terence Kearley, 3rd Viscount Devonport RIBA FRSA (born 29 August 1944), is a British peer.

Viscount Devonport was educated at Aiglon College in Switzerland, Selwyn College, Cambridge (BA, DipArch) and Newcastle University (BPhil). He was an architect by profession.

He sat in the House of Lords from 1973 until 1999 when he lost his seat after the passing of the House of Lords Act 1999.

Peerage of the United Kingdom
Preceded by Gerald Chester Kearley	Viscount Devonport; 1973–present	Incumbent
