= Viscount Devonport =

Title in the Peerage of the United Kingdom

Viscountcy of Devonport
- Azure in chief two Mitres Argent garnished Or and in base a Square Tower of the second
- Creation date: 22 Jun 1917
- Created by: King George V
- Peerage: Peerage of the United Kingdom
- First holder: Hudson Ewbanke Kearley, 1st Viscount Devonport
- Present holder: Terence Kearley, 3rd Viscount Devonport
- Heir presumptive: The Hon. Chester Dagley Hugh Kearley
- Status: Extant

Viscount Devonport, of Wittington in the County of Buckingham, is a title in the Peerage of the United Kingdom. It was created on 22 June 1917 for the former Member of Parliament for Devonport, Hudson Kearley, 1st Baron Devonport. He had already been created a Baronet, of Wittington in the Parish of Medmenham in the County of Buckingham on 22 July 1908, and Baron Devonport, of Wittington in the County of Buckingham, on 15 July 1910.

As of 2026 the titles are held by his grandson, the 3rd Viscount, who succeeded his father in 1973.

The family seat is Ray Demesne, near Kirkwhelpington, Northumberland.

== Viscounts Devonport (1917) ==
- Hudson Ewbanke Kearley, 1st Viscount Devonport (1856–1934)
- Gerald Chester Kearley, 2nd Viscount Devonport (1890–1973)
- Terence Kearley, 3rd Viscount Devonport (b. 1944)

The heir presumptive is the present holder's cousin, David Kearley (b. 1982).

== Notes ==
Baronetage of the United Kingdom
| Preceded by Borthwick baronets | Kearley baronets of Wittington; 22 July 1908 | Succeeded by Layland-Barratt baronets |
