= Anthony Benn =

Anthony Benn could refer to:

- Anthony Benn (Recorder of London) (c. 1568–1618), English barrister
- Anthony Benn (cricketer) (1912–2008), British cricketer and army officer
- Tony Benn (1925–2014), British politician and writer

== See also ==
- Anthony Benin (born 1950), Ghanaian judge
