= Ben (comic strip) =

Ben is a Canadian comic strip syndicated by MWAM and available on GoComics that is also included in American and other English-speaking newspapers. There is also a French version. It is the creation of artist and author Daniel Shelton.

== Characters ==
- Ben Hatley, a recent retiree from Oshawa, Ontario.
- Olivia Hatley, Ben's wife, a retired schoolteacher.
- Patty Tokoname, Ben and Olivia's daughter, a sales rep and soccer coach.
- Nathan Tokoname, Patty's husband, a graphic artist. He is of Japanese heritage.
- Nicholas Tokoname, Patty and Nathan's oldest child, an eight-year-old boy with black hair often seen wearing a striped shirt.
- Michael Tokoname, Patty and Nathan's second child, a brown-haired six-year-old boy.
- Alec Tokoname, Patty and Nathan's third child, a red-haired four-year-old.
- Mia Tokoname, Patty and Nathan's fourth child and only daughter, aged two.
- Max, a golden retriever.
- George Tokoname, Nathan's father.
- Ann Tokoname, Nathan's mother.

Although the main character is a retiree, the comic strip prefers not to limit itself to the typical senior citizen stereotypes, opting instead to show seniors as modern and vibrant.
