= Hudson Kearley, 1st Viscount Devonport =

British politician (1856–1934)

The Right Honourable The Viscount Devonport PC DL
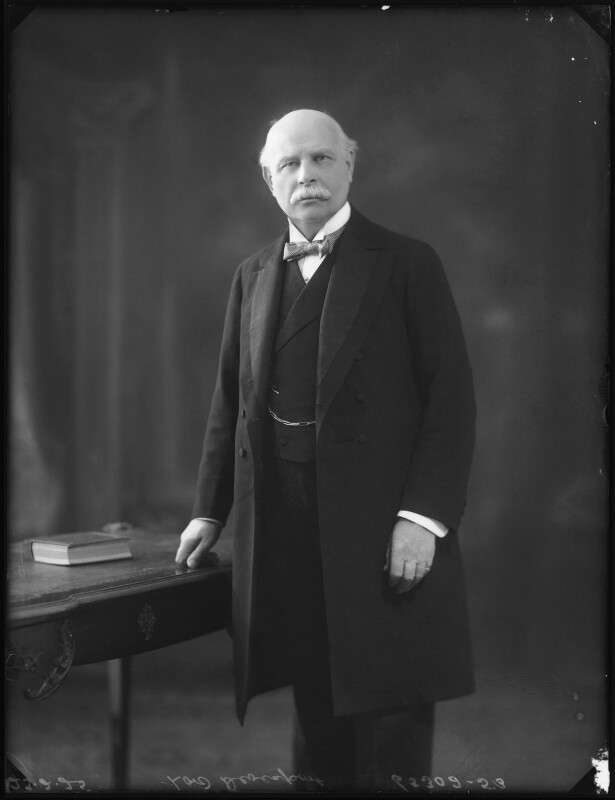
- Devonport in 1925

Personal details
- Born: Hudson Ewbanke Kearley; 1 September 1856 Uxbridge, Middlesex, England
- Died: 5 September 1934 (aged 78) Dunkeld, Perthshire, Scotland
- Resting place: Hambleden, Buckinghamshire, England
- Party: Liberals
- Occupation: Grocer, politician

Hudson Ewbanke Kearley, 1st Viscount Devonport, PC, DL (1 September 1856 – 5 September 1934), styled Lord Devonport between 1910 and 1917, was an English grocer and politician. He founded the International Tea Company's Stores, became the first chairman of the Port of London Authority, and served as Minister of Food Control during World War I.

== Early life and business career ==
Devonport was the tenth and youngest child of George Ewbanke Kearley (1814–1876) and his wife, Mary Ann Hudson. He studied at Surrey County School (now Cranleigh School) and joined Tetley & Sons in 1872. In 1876, Devonport founded a tea importing company, known as Kearley and Tonge from 1887, and began retailing his own goods in 1878. In 1890, he had over 200 branches trading as International Stores and in 1895, both companies were combined to form International Tea Company's Stores and shares were offered to the public.

== Marriage and family ==
Hudson Kearley married Selina Chester in 1888. They had three children: daughter Beryl, and sons Gerald, 2nd Viscount Devonport, and Mark.

== Public service ==
Hudson Kearley c1895

Devonport was elected as a Liberal Member of Parliament for Devonport in the 1892 general election. He worked hard for a number of years on ensuring that the more than £1m within Patriotic Fund was unlocked and made available for the purposes that it had been donated. He was appointed a deputy lieutenant of Buckinghamshire in 1901. In 1905, he was appointed Parliamentary Secretary to the Board of Trade, assisting the President of the Board of Trade, David Lloyd George.

He was aligned with the Liberal Imperialist grouping in the Liberal Party, and was one of the three sitting Liberal MPs who joined the Liberal Imperial Council prior to the 1900 general election (together with Robert William Perks and Andrew Provand).

He was created a baronet, of Wittington in the Parish of Medmenham in the County of Buckingham, on 22 July 1908 and became a member of the Privy Council in 1909. He retired from the lower house after the January 1910 general election.

He played an important part in the passage of the Port of London Bill in 1908 and served as unpaid chairman of the Port of London Authority from 1909 until 1925.

He was elevated to the peerage as Baron Devonport, of Wittington in the County of Buckingham on 15 July 1910. It was reported in The New York Times that he declined to contribute to party funds in return for the peerage, feeling that his party contribution and unpaid services in relation to the Port of London were great enough to warrant the distinction without payment. After proposing to submit the related correspondence to the press, no money was exchanged.

This did not save him from being the subject of a savage epigram by Hilaire Belloc:

The grocer Hudson Kearley, he

When purchasing his barony

Considered first, we understand,

The title of Lord Sugarsand,

Or then again he might have been

Lord Underweight of Margarine:

But being of the nobler sort

He took the title Devonport.

He was appointed as Minister of Food Control in December 1916 by Lloyd George and he submitted a proposal for compulsory rationing in May 1917, seemingly delayed as to protect the interests of retailers. He came under attack, particularly from Noel Pemberton Billing, with insinuations of war profiteering. On 1 June 1917 he resigned due to "ill health". Announced in the 1917 Birthday Honours he was created Viscount Devonport, of Wittington in the County of Buckingham on 22 June 1917.

Wittington was his estate where Wittington House was constructed in 1897 based on Sir Reginald Blomfield's design. Bloomfield was asked to significantly enlarge the house in 1908. The gardens of Kearley's estate were maintained by hundreds of gardeners.

== In literature and popular culture ==
Devonport's wartime measures for the rationing of sugar and other imported commodities were satirised by Neil Munro in his Erchie MacPherson story "The Last of the Bridescakes", first published in the Glasgow Evening News of 12 February 1917.

Parliament of the United Kingdom
Preceded by Sir John Henry Puleston; George Edward Price	Member of Parliament for Devonport; 1892–January 1910; With: E. J. C. Morton 1892–1902; John Lockie 1902–1906; John Benn 1906–1910	Succeeded by Sir John Jackson; Sir Clement Kinloch-Cooke
Political offices
New office	Minister of Food Control; 1916–1917	Succeeded by David Alfred Thomas
Peerage of the United Kingdom
New creation	Viscount Devonport; 1917–1934	Succeeded by Gerald Kearley
New creation	Baron Devonport; 1910–1934	Succeeded by Gerald Kearley
Baronetage of the United Kingdom
New creation	Baronet (of Wittington); 1908–1934	Succeeded by Gerald Kearley
