= Southington High School =

Location
- 720 Pleasant Street; Southington, Connecticut 06489; United States
- Coordinates: 41°36′55″N 72°51′41″W

Information
- Type: Public high school
- Established: 1848 (178 years ago)
- CEEB code: 070690
- Principal: Rich Aroian
- Teaching staff: 142.20 (on an FTE basis)
- Enrollment: 1,920 (2023-2024)
- Student to teacher ratio: 13.50
- Colors: Blue and white
- Athletics conference: CCC West
- Mascot: Blue Knight
- Website: shs.southingtonschools.org

Southington High School (previously Lewis Academy and Lewis High School) is a public high school located at 720 Pleasant Street in Southington, Connecticut.
It is the only high school in Southington.

== History ==
Southington residents Sally Lewis and her cousin Adin Lewis left bequests to build the Lewis Academy, which when it opened in 1848 provided a classical education including "Latin, Greek, mathematics, geography, and other branches higher than are taught in the common school." In 1882 the academy became Lewis High School and was acquired by the town of Southington, becoming a public school. In 1949, the one hundredth year of the school, the last class graduated. Lewis High School became Southington High School in 1950 when the new building opened.

== Academics ==
Southington High School offers a hierarchical system with classes designed to suit student ability level. These courses are academic, accelerated, and college-level classes.

Faculty members are responsible for suggesting the most appropriate level of courses to individual students; however, students are allowed to enroll in courses of any difficulty level with the written permission of their parents and an individual meeting with the student's guidance counselor.

Southington High School offers a number of Advanced Placement courses as well as for-credit foreign language courses through the University of Connecticut's Early College Experience program. Some other courses, such as Accounting II, will also offer college credit if completed with an unweighted grade above 75.

== Athletics ==
Southington competes in the West division of the Central Connecticut Conference, which consists of New Britain High School, Simsbury High School, Hall High School, Newington High School, Conard High School, Farmington High School, and Northwest Catholic High School. Sports that are at Southington are:

- Soccer
- Football
- Volleyball
- Field Hockey (girls)
- Cross Country
- Track & Field
- Basketball
- Softball
- Baseball
- Tennis
- Swimming/Diving
- Lacrosse
- Hockey
- Wrestling
- Marching Band

=== Sports stadiums ===
The largest stadium at Southington High School is Fontana Field. Sports that are played at Fontana Field are: football, soccer, lacrosse, marching band, field hockey, and track & field. The SHS athletic complex contains two football fields, three soccer fields, two softball fields, two baseball fields, two field hockey fields, a lacrosse field, and tennis courts. The volleyball and basketball teams play in one of the two gyms at SHS.

== School news ==
The Emblem is Southington High School's student newspaper. First published in 1898, it has been continuously published since 1911.

== PCB scare ==
In September of the 2000–2001 school year, the motor that runs the school's clocks exploded in the basement of Southington High School. Students were kept out of the building for days as everything was tested for cancerous PCBs.

== Notable alumni ==
- James R. Benn, author, best known for Billy Boyle book series
- Tom Cichowski, professional football player with the Green Bay Packers 1967 and Denver Broncos 1967-1968
- Rob Dibble, professional baseball player
- John Krafcik, CEO of Waymo, LLC and former CEO of Hyundai Motor America
- Carl Pavano, professional baseball player
- Chris Petersen, professional baseball player
- Mike Raczka, professional baseball player
- Sal Romano, professional baseball player
- Parker Porter, professional MMA fighter
