= Jeffrey Benton =

Australian cricketer (born 1953)

Personal information
- Full name: Jeffrey John Benton
- Born: 9 October 1953 (age 73); Mildura, Victoria, Australia
- Batting: Right-handed
- Bowling: Right-arm medium
- Relatives: Nick Benton (son)

Domestic team information
- Years: Team
- 1977/78–1984/85: South Australia

Career statistics
Competition	First-class	List A
Matches	4	4
Runs scored	118	40
Batting average	14.75	20.00
100s/50s	0/0	0/0
Top score	42	27
Balls bowled	322	184
Wickets	2	1
Bowling average	115.00	161.00
5 wickets in innings	0	0
10 wickets in match	0	0
Best bowling	2/144	1/36
Catches/stumpings	4/–	0/–
- Source: Cricinfo, 24 April 2018

Jeffrey John Benton (born 9 October 1953) is an Australian former cricketer. He played four first-class and four List A matches for South Australia between the 1977–78 season and 1984–85. His son, Nick Benton, also played for South Australia.
