= Anthony Benn (cricketer) =

English cricketer and British Army officer

Personal information
- Full name: Anthony Benn
- Born: 7 October 1912; Kensington, London, England
- Died: 23 September 2008 (aged 95); Chichester, Sussex, England
- Batting: Right-handed
- Bowling: Right-arm medium

Domestic team information
- Years: Team
- 1934–1935: Oxford University

Career statistics
Competition	First-class
Matches	12
Runs scored	378
Batting average	6.33
100s/50s	–/3
Top score	90
Balls bowled	204
Wickets	0
Bowling average	–
5 wickets in innings	–
10 wickets in match	–
Best bowling	–
Catches/stumpings	6/–
- Source: Cricinfo, 12 January 2020

Anthony Benn MBE (7 October 1912 — 23 September 2008) was an English first-class cricketer and British Army officer.

Benn was born at Kensington in October 1912. He was educated at Harrow School, before going up to Christ Church, Oxford. While studying at Oxford, he played first-class cricket for Oxford University, making his debut against a combined Minor Counties cricket team at Oxford in 1934. The remainder of his nine first-class appearances for Oxford all followed in 1935. In his ten first-class matches for Oxford, Benn scored 378 runs at an average of 18.90, with a highest score of 90. With his right-arm medium pace bowling, he bowled a total of 34 wicketless overs, conceding 135 runs.

After graduating from Oxford, he was commissioned as a second lieutenant in the 98th (Surrey and Sussex Yeomanry) in May 1936. With the Yeomanry forming a part of the Royal Artillery, Benn served in the Second World War, reaching the rank of temporary lieutenant colonel by the conclusion of the war. In December 1945, he was made an MBE. Benn died at Chichester in September 2008.
