= Thomas Benton =

Thomas Benton may refer to:

- Thomas Hart Benton (painter) (1889–1975), American painter and muralist
- Thomas Hart Benton (politician) (1782–1858), U.S. senator from Missouri and great uncle of the painter
- Thomas Hart Benton (Iowa politician) (1815–1879), American politician and Civil War veteran
- Thomas W. Benton (1930–2007), American artist known for his political posters
- Tommy Benton, American politician from Georgia
- William Pannapacker (born 1968), American English professor who has written under the pen name "Thomas H. Benton"
