= William Benton =

William, Bill, or Billy Benton may refer to:

- William Benton (politician) (1900–1973), United States Senator from Connecticut and publisher of the Encyclopædia Britannica
- William Benton (writer) (born 1939), American poet and writer
- William Benton (cricketer) (1873–1916), English cricketer
- William Duane Benton (born 1950), federal judge from Missouri
- William Plummer Benton (1828–1867), general during the American Civil War
- Bill Benton (footballer) (1906–1979), Australian rules footballer
- Bill W. Benton, American sound engineer
- Billy Benton (1895–1967), English footballer

== See also ==
- William Benton Clulow (1802–1882), English dissenting minister, tutor and writer
