= Nick Benton (cricketer) =

Australian cricketer

Personal information
- Full name: Nicholas John Benton
- Born: 29 June 1991 (age 35); Ashford, South Australia
- Batting: Right-handed
- Bowling: Right-arm medium
- Role: Bowler
- Relatives: Jeffrey Benton (father)

Domestic team information
- Years: Team
- 2014/15–2016/17: South Australia (squad no. 30)
- FC debut: 13 March 2015 South Australia v Queensland
- Last FC: 17 November 2016 South Australia v Queensland
- LA debut: 2 October 2016 South Australia v Western Australia
- Last LA: 9 October 2016 South Australia v Queensland

Career statistics
Competition	First-class	List A
Matches	5	3
Runs scored	70	24
Batting average	23.33	12.00
100s/50s	0/0	0/0
Top score	33*	21
Balls bowled	1,002	156
Wickets	11	3
Bowling average	50.09	56.33
5 wickets in innings	0	0
10 wickets in match	0	0
Best bowling	4/95	2/74
Catches/stumpings	2/–	2/–
- Source: ESPNcricinfo, 6 October 2021

Nicholas John Benton (born 29 June 1991) is an Australian cricketer. He made his List A debut for South Australia in the 2016–17 Matador BBQs One-Day Cup on 2 October 2016.

== Career ==
Born in Ashford, a suburb of Adelaide, South Australia, Benton made his first-class debut for South Australia in the final match of the 2014–15 Sheffield Shield season, taking four wickets and scoring 33 not out against Queensland. This earned him his first SACA contract, officially joining the South Australian squad for the 2015–16 season. He played three Sheffield Shield matches in the 2015–16 season, across which he took six wickets, and the highlight of his season came in a match against Western Australia. Benton dislocated his shoulder in a fielding mishap on the first day of the match, meaning he was unable to bowl for the rest of the match, with later scans showing the damage was severe enough that he couldn't play for the rest of the season. In the last innings South Australia needed seven runs to win and keep their season alive when the ninth wicket fell, and Benton was the only player yet to bat. Benton fought through his injury and scored the winning runs with a mishit through the slips.

Benton was in South Australia's one-day squad for the first time in the 2016–17 Matador BBQs One-Day Cup, making his List A debut against Western Australia.

== Outside cricket ==
In April 2021, Benton was a housemate in Big Brother Australia Season 13.
