= Bentonville station =

- Bentonville Train Station
- U.S. National Register of Historic Places
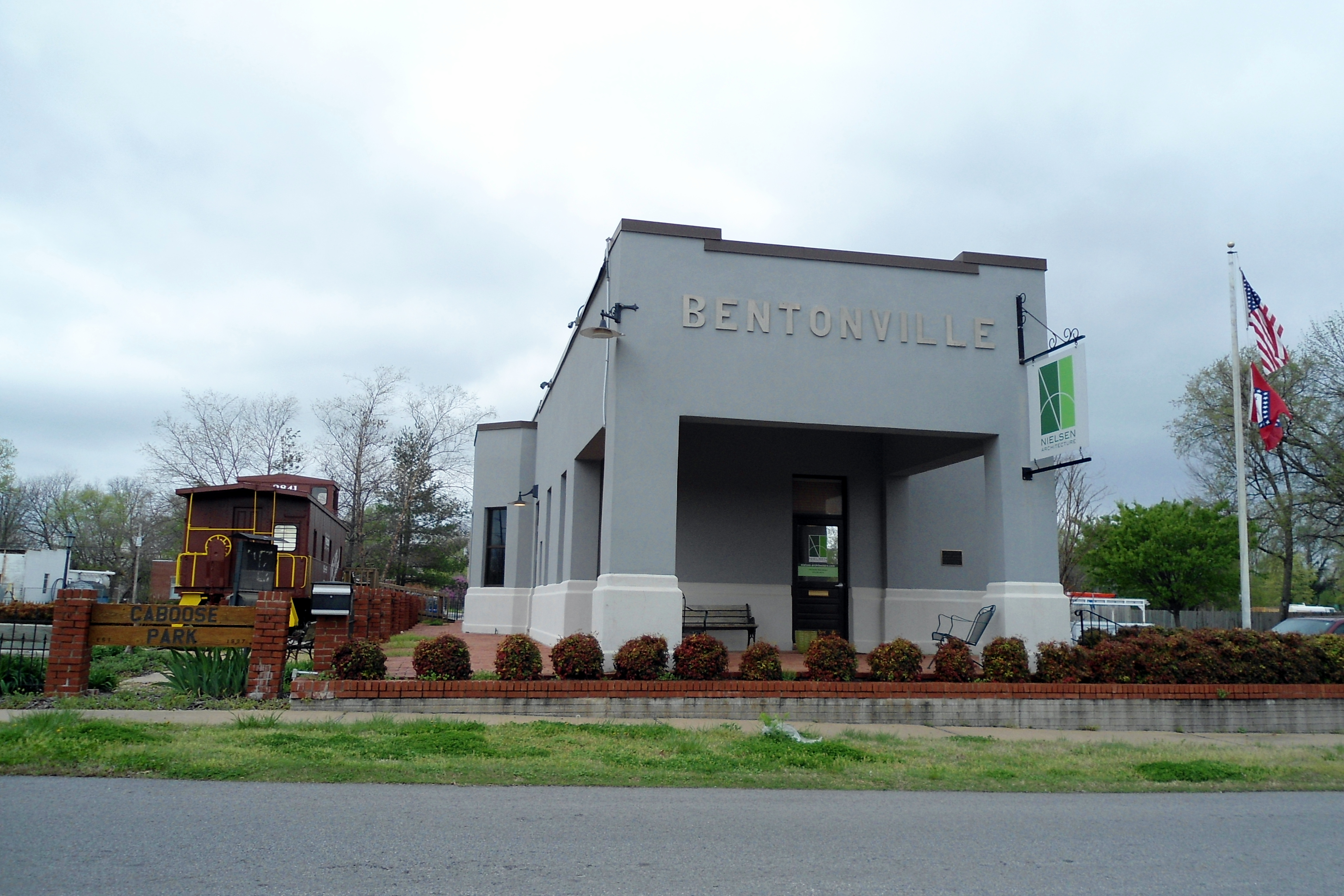
- Bentonville Train Station, March 2012

- Location within Arkansas Location within the United States
- Location: 414 S. Main St., Bentonville, Arkansas
- Coordinates: 36°22′1″N 94°12′33″W
- Area: less than one acre
- Built: 1925
- MPS: Benton County MRA
- NRHP reference No.: 87002337
- Added to NRHP: January 28, 1988

The Bentonville Train Station is a former train station in Bentonville, Arkansas. Built in 1925 on Main Street, the train station served a short connector line that connected Bentonville to the St. Louis and San Francisco Railway (Frisco) to the east in Rogers, and the Kansas City, Pittsburg and Gulf Railroad to the west in Gravette. The building was listed on the National Register of Historic Places (NRHP) in 1988.

== History ==
=== Railroads in Benton County ===
Alfred B. Greenwood put forth legislation in the United States House of Representatives in 1853 concerning right of way for a railroad between Springfield, Missouri and Bentonville, but railroads did not come to Arkansas until after the Civil War. In the 1870s, the St. Louis and San Francisco Railway was interested in extending their line south from Pierce City, Missouri through Bentonville and Fayetteville to Fort Smith to service the fertile orchards and tobacco fields of northwest Arkansas. The routing changed around 1880, and the Frisco instead ran through Avoca, Lowell, and Rogers before entering Fayetteville, missing Bentonville entirely. Bentonville businessmen built a short, 5.25-mile (8.45 km) spur line called the Bentonville Railroad in 1882 to connect to the Frisco in Rogers. Although this provided rail service to Bentonville, the Frisco charged high rates for usage of their line.

The spur between Bentonville and Rogers became part of the Arkansas and Oklahoma Railroad in 1898 and was extended west to the Kansas City, Pittsburg and Gulf Railroad in Gravette. The extension gave Bentonville citizens, businesspeople, and farmers an alternative to the Frisco. In 1899 the line was extended further west to Grove, Oklahoma. The Frisco purchased the line in 1900. These railroads gave Bentonville and western Benton County an opportunity to grow the apple industry that was emerging after the decline of tobacco in the area.

This Bentonville Train Station replaced an inefficient structure on the same site in 1925. Following World War II, the train station ceased operations and became derelict. A group became interested in the station's rehabilitation in 1980 and leased the building to the Bentonville Chamber of Commerce upon restoration.

== Today ==
The Bentonville Train Station now serves as the home of the Bentonville History Museum. Adjacent to the north is Train Station Park which offers a landscaped area around a gazebo and several benches. The park also gives access to the Downtown Trail. On the opposite side of the building is a Frisco company caboose which was moved to the location when the Bentonville Chamber of Commerce was housed in the station. Across the street from the train station is the Bentonville Public Library, also listed on the NRHP.

== See also ==
- National Register of Historic Places listings in Benton County, Arkansas

Preceding station	St. Louis–San Francisco Railway	Following station
Centerton toward Grove	Grove – Rogers	Little Flock toward Rogers
