= Benn (painter) =

French painter

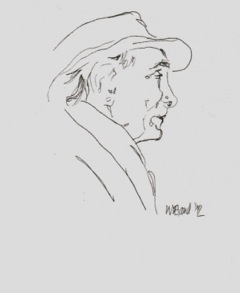

Bencjon Rabinowicz (1905–1989), known by the pseudonym Benn, was a painter associated with the School of Paris. His early work was mostly figurative; much of his later work is inspired by the Bible, particularly the Book of Psalms.

== Biography ==
Benn was born in 1905 in Białystok, Russian Empire, where his father was an architect and his grandfather was a rabbi. He demonstrated an early talent for painting. In 1917, he began giving private lessons in drawing. In 1926, he started making theatre sets. In 1927, Benn had his first private exhibition in Wilno (Second Polish Republic). After his admission to the Union of Professional Artists of Poland in 1928, Benn started exhibiting his works in Białystok and Warsaw. In 1929, he received a scholarship to study for three years in Paris, where he attended the Académie Fernand Léger. It was upon his arrival in Paris that he changed his name to Benn and used it exclusively for the rest of his life. During his studies at the Académie, Benn drew on geometric forms but refrained from becoming an abstract painter. In 1932, Benn met ballet dancer and artist Ghera; they wed in 1938 and Benn became a French citizen.

In 1939, after being mobilized and discharged in Brittany, Benn sent paintings from Rennes to the Salon d'Automne exhibits and began sculpting. In 1941, Benn was interned at Beaune-la-Rolande. He was eventually released with the help of professor Marcel Brulé and art critic Lo Duca. Following his release, Benn went into hiding for 26 months with the protection of Jean Paulhan. During this time, Benn produced 62 works that were inspired by biblical verses and motifs. Following the Liberation in 1944, Benn returned permanently to Paris and continued to exhibit his work in galleries and museums across Europe.

In 1949, Benn collaborated with the artist Marc Chagall to create a company of painters and sculptors.

In 1966, an association called "Friends of the Work of the Painter Benn" was established.

Following a long career, Benn bequeathed a collection of his works to the French commune Rueil-Malmaison.

In 1987, Benn donated 190 biblical oils to the Musée d'art sacré du Gard. He died in Paris in 1989.

Benn's wife, Ghera, died in 1994. Upon her death, the Musée d'art sacré du Gard received an additional collection of lithographs, paintings, and medals that represented Benn's creative works and contributions.

== Artistic career ==
Initially inspired by Russian Constructivism, Kinetic art, and Cubism, Benn's style evolved over time. He went through a geometric period that was influenced by Wassily Kandinsky, then Symbolism; eventually he adopted a Poetic Realist style.

In 1930, Benn was admitted to the Association of Professional Artists, Paris. His first exhibition in Paris was in 1931 at Galerie L'Époque. Between 1932 and 1939, Benn's works were exhibited at private galleries and exhibitions in France, including Salon d'Automne and Les Independents. In 1940, upon the exclusion of Jewish artists from the exhibition, Benn's work was rejected by the Salon d'Automne.

In 1956, Benn received the Gold Medal from the Salon des Artistes Français. In 1957, he was awarded the Prix de L'Institut de France. In 1960, he published 62 psaumes et versets de la Bible, based on sketches he did while in hiding during World War II. In 1962, he received the Grand Médaille de Vermeil de la Ville de Paris. The same year, Fox (Paris) produced a film about Benn. In 1969, Benn continued his contributions to the theatre community by creating scenes and costumes for the play, Job, at the National Theatre in Amsterdam. During the 1970s, Benn received awards from Petah Tikva, Levallois-Perret, Île-de-France, and Bordeaux. In 1974, Benn received a prize from the Académie des Beaux-Arts for his album, "Le cantique des cantiques," illustrations to the biblical book, The Song of Songs, which was presented to the Bibliothèque nationale. That year, Benn also received the Légion d'Honneur. In 1975, in honour of his 70th birthday, Benn received the Médaille du Jubilé from the Musée de la Monnaie de Paris. In 1986, Benn received an international prize in recognition of donating his poster design symbolizing peace and human rights to UNESCO. Benn's mural entitled, "Love and Peace" (1985), was donated to UNESCO in 1987 and remains at the organization's headquarters in Paris. In 1988, Benn was awarded the Grand Prix d'Honneur et Médaille de l'Académie des Beaux-Arts, Lyon.
