= Jonathon Benn =

English cricketer

Personal information
- Full name: Jonathon Andrew Benn
- Born: 24 June 1967 (age 59); Rawtenstall, Lancashire, England
- Batting: Right-handed
- Bowling: Right-arm medium

Domestic team information
- Years: Team
- 1989–2002: Northumberland

Career statistics
| Competition | List A |
|---|---|
| Matches | 1 |
| Runs scored | 1 |
| Batting average | 1.00 |
| 100s/50s | –/– |
| Top score | 1 |
| Balls bowled | – |
| Wickets | – |
| Bowling average | – |
| 5 wickets in innings | – |
| 10 wickets in match | – |
| Best bowling | – |
| Catches/stumpings | –/– |
- Source: Cricinfo, 30 June 2011

Jonathon Andrew Benn (born 24 June 1967) is a former English cricketer. Benn was a right-handed batsman who bowls right-arm medium pace. He was born in Rawtenstall, Lancashire.

Benn made his debut for Northumberland in the 1989 MCCA Knockout Trophy against Lincolnshire. Benn played Minor counties cricket for Northumberland from 1989 to 2002, which included 43 Minor Counties Championship matches and 7 MCCA Knockout Trophy matches. He made his only List A appearance against Yorkshire in the 1992 NatWest Trophy. He opened the batting in this match, scoring a single run before being dismissed by Darren Gough.
