= William Bevil Thomas =

Newfoundland merchant and land developer (1757–1825)

William Bevil Thomas (1757–1825) was a merchant, land developer and sea captain notable in the history of St. John's, Colony of Newfoundland, and in the history of Newfoundland and Labrador province.

Thomas was born in St John's and came from a line of merchant mariners from Devon, England. He was genealogically connected with many other prominent families in Newfoundland, Britain and New England. Daniel Woodley Prowse wrote: "The family of the Thomases are probably the most ancient in this Colony." They carried on business at Dartmouth and St. John's in partnership with a Mr. Stokes, as Thomas & Stokes.

Thomas's shipping operations brought him along a triangular route that included Britain, the Caribbean and Newfoundland. In 1757, he married Elizabeth Way in Dartmouth, England. The couple's two sons, William Thomas and Henry Phillips Thomas, were prominent men in the generation after their father. According to Prowse:

...officials and merchants vied with each other in creating country residences and farms [...] finest of all, Brookfield, the property of William and Henry P. Thomas.

[...] William Thomas was foremost in every benevolent work. As a very young man he was secretary to the society for improving the condition of the poor; he was equally distinguished as a merchant and a politician. He filled all positions well, whether presiding at a religious meeting or as president of the Chamber of Commerce. Through a professedly religious man, sometimes the old leaven broken out him. He was very active, and fond of directing everybody. Often, as he paced his long wharf, if one of his ships was beating in the Narrows, say his fine brig the Cynthia, Captain Goldsworth, he could be heard muttering, "Luff, confound you, Goldsworth, luff, you lubber!' Brookfield, the fine house at Devon Row, their Water Street premises, and the beautiful cottage at Topsail, are monuments to the large progressive ideas of the Thomases, and especially of the constructive ability of Henry Phillips Thomas.

The author also mentions that William Thomas was one of the most prominent Protestant merchants who rallied for a local legislature during the administration of Sir Thomas Cochrane.
