= Behn =

Behn may refer to:

== People ==
=== Surname ===
- Aphra Behn (c. 1640 – 1689), English dramatist
- Ari Behn (1972–2019), Norwegian author and husband to Princess Märtha Louise of Norway
- Chad Behn, American politician
- Friedl Behn-Grund (1906–1989), German cinematographer
- Hernán Behn (died 1933), Puerto Rican businessman; brother of Sosthenes Behn
- Harry Behn (also known as Giles Behn; 1898–1973), U.S. screenwriter and children's author
- Jerry Behn (born 1954), U.S. politician
- Noel Behn (1928?–1998), U.S. novelist, screenwriter, and theatrical producer
- Richard R. Behn (fl. 1978-2007), NOAA rear admiral
- Robin Behn (born 1958), U.S. poet and professor
- Sarla Behn (born Catherine Mary Heilman; 1901–1982), English Gandhian social activist
- Sosthenes Behn (1882–1957), Puerto Rican businessman; brother of Hernan Behn
- Wilhelm Friedrich Georg Behn (1808–1878), German anatomist and zoologist

=== Given name ===
- Behn Wilson (born 1958), Canadian ice hockey player

== Other ==
- Behn River, a river of Western Australia
- Behn's bat (Glyphonycteris behnii), a rare South American bat species
- Waldemar Behn, usually called just BEHN, a German alcoholic beverage company

== See also ==
- Benn, a surname and given name
