= Benville =

Benville may refer to:

== Places ==
=== Canada ===
- Benville, original name of Sexsmith, Alberta, a town

=== United States ===
- Benville, Illinois, an unincorporated community
- Benville Township, Beltrami County, Minnesota
- Benville Bridge, Bigger Township, Jennings County, Indiana, on the National Register of Historic Places

=== United Kingdom ===
- Benville, Dorset, a small settlement
- Benville Manor - see Grade II* listed buildings in West Dorset

== People ==
- E. Benville, a fireman/stoker on the ocean liner Titanic - see Crew of the RMS Titanic
