= Ernest Benn =

British publisher, writer, and political economic pamphleteer

Sir Ernest Benn Bt CBE
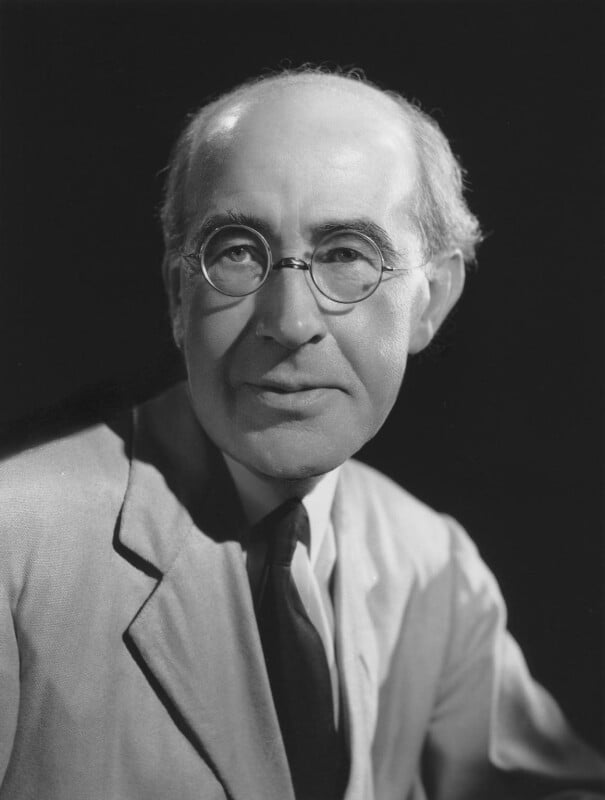
- Benn in 1947
- Born: Ernest John Pickstone Benn; 25 June 1875; Oxted, Surrey, England
- Died: 17 January 1954 (aged 78); Oxted, Surrey, England
- Occupations: Publisher, writer and political publicist.

Sir Ernest John Pickstone Benn, 2nd Baronet, CBE (25 June 1875 – 17 January 1954) was a British publisher, writer and political publicist. His father, John Benn, was a Liberal politician, who had been made a baronet in 1914. He was brother of the Liberal and later Labour politician William Wedgwood Benn, and an uncle of the Labour politician Tony Benn.

== Biography ==
=== Early years ===
Ernest John Pickstone Benn was born on 28 June 1875 at Oxted in Surrey, the eldest son of John William Benn and Elizabeth (née Pickstone). His father was a furniture designer.

Ernest was educated at the Middle Class School of London, a fee-paying day school in Cowper Street in the London Borough of Islington. From about April 1889 Ernest Benn and his younger brother lived for eighteen months with a family in Paris, in an exchange arrangement between the two families, involving two French girls from the Parisian family.

After returning from Paris, aged sixteen, Benn attempted to pass the London matriculation examination at the Cowper Street school, but he failed in three of the required five subjects. In December 1891 he started work in his father's office as the junior office boy, supervised by the senior office boy. After a year Benn was put into the design studio as an apprentice, his father entertaining the hope that his son "might develop into a draughtsman and designer".

=== Publishing ===
In the early 1890s Benn's father stood as a parliamentary candidate, and Ernest, in addition to his regular office work, assisted with his political campaign. Benn's father, in his furniture design business, had established a trade journal in 1880 called The Cabinet Maker and Art Furnisher, an illustrated monthly publication dealing with the artistic and technical aspects of furniture, published by the family company Benn Brothers Ltd. In about 1894 Ernest Benn was appointed managing director of The Cabinet Maker and went on the road selling advertisement space, in which capacity he "worked hard and happily" until 1900.

In December 1899 the firm of Hazell, Watson and Viney, who owned and published The Hardware Trade Journal, offered to sell the monthly publication to Benn's father. John Benn "saw an opportunity to allow his son to develop on his own account" and encouraged and assisted his son to purchase The Hardware Trade Journal, to be managed along with The Cabinet Maker. In order to purchase The Hardware Trade Journal Ernest Benn joined with F. J. Francis, an experienced trade journal sub-editor, to form a company and issue a prospectus to secure the required capital via one pound shares. Hazell, Watson and Viney accepted a proposition to receive the purchase price of £1,500 in shares (to be paid out within seven years), but the prospectus was initially met with little response. John Benn then offered to subscribe 500 shares, if it could be matched by an equal amount or more from other investors. Francis was able to take advantage of his contacts in the retail ironmongery trade and was eventually able to secure a thousand shares to enable the sale to go through. As Ernest Benn later wrote, the added responsibility "marked the end of my period of apprenticeship as a publisher and the beginning of my real life's work".

The first issue of The Hardware Trade Journal, under its new management, was produced in March 1900, with Francis as editor and Benn as publisher and manager, working from offices in Finsbury Square in central London. It had been decided to publish the journal on a weekly basis. Benn later described the years 1900 to 1907 as "the hardest years of my life". Francis died in about 1902 ("his end being unquestionably hastened by the strain of that period"), after which Benn took on the additional role as editor.

Ernest Benn and Gwendoline Dorothy Andrews were married on 3 January 1903 at the parish church at Edgbaston, a suburb of Birmingham in the West Midlands.

During the lead-up to the 1906 general election, Benn acted as the election agent for his brother, William Wedgwood Benn, in his successful campaign as the Liberal Party candidate for the electorate of Tower Hamlets (St. George Division).

The business of publishing The Hardware Trade Journal gradually achieved a sound financial footing and by the end of 1908 Benn had complete responsibility for the enterprise and owned most of the company shares.

The firm began to expand, publishing a number of trade journals (such as Gas World, the Fruit Grower and the Electrician) and other journals designed for the export market, as well as "technical books for each specialized public". Ernest Benn provided the inspiration and energy behind the expansion, a situation readily acknowledged by his father, John Benn, who had been elected to the London County Council (LCC) after it was established in 1889. He became leader of the Progressives faction on the LCC and was active as an office-holder and committee member.

In 1916, Benn was appointed Director of Training in the Ministry of Munitions and also chairman of the Trade Organisation Commission. As a civil servant in the Ministry of Munitions and Reconstruction during the First World War, he came to believe in the benefits of state intervention in the economy. By the mid-1920s, however, he changed his mind and adopted "the principles of undiluted laissez-faire".

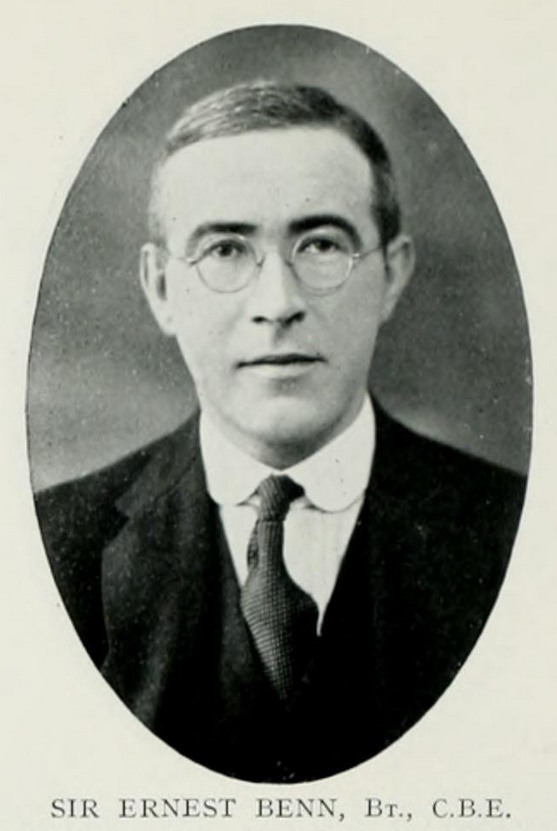
Benn, about 1922

In 1918 Benn was appointed a Commander of the Order of the British Empire (CBE).

=== Post-war ===
In 1921, William Benn introduced his brother Ernest to Victor Gollancz. On William's recommendation, Gollancz was employed by Benn Brothers Ltd. to review and develop the list of magazines published by the company. Within six months Gollancz convinced Benn to publish a series of art books under the company's imprint. The books were extremely successful, leading to a rapid increase in company profits. Gollancz also recruited novelists such as Edith Nesbit and H. G. Wells to the publishing company.

By the early 1920s Benn was honorary treasurer of the Industrial League and chairman of the Higher Production Council. Benn's father had been created a baronet in June 1914, and after Sir John Benn's death in April 1922 his eldest son, Ernest Benn, succeeded to the baronetcy. In 1923 the company changed its name from Benn Brothers Ltd. to Ernest Benn Limited.

Although Benn considered Victor Gollancz to be a "publishing genius", he was not prepared to cede full control of the company to him. The two men had grown apart politically; Benn had moved to the right during the 1920s, whereas Gollancz had leftist views and strongly supported the Labour Party. Gollancz expressed his disapproval of the publication in 1925 of Ernest Benn's book, Confessions of a Capitalist, in which the merits of laissez-faire capitalism were extolled. Gollancz's contract expired in April 1927, after which he left Ernest Benn Ltd. to form his own publishing company.

=== Liberalism ===
In the wake of the nine-day general strike in May 1926 Benn was a founding member of the Individualist Movement, an organisation that opposed 'state socialism' and increases in state expenditure.

Ernest Benn Ltd. constructed new offices in Fleet Street, in a building known as Bouverie House, which the company occupied by mid-1926. In addition to individual books, the output of the publishing house included whole series of paperback educational books, published during the inter-war years from the late 1920s. Popular series produced by Ernest Benn Ltd. were the 'Sixpenny Library' and 'Sixpenny Poets' educational series and the travel guides 'The Blue Guides'.

In 1928 and 1929 Benn served as president of the National Advertising Benevolent Society.

From his conversion to classical liberalism in the mid-1920s until his death in 1954 Benn published more than twenty books and an equivalent number of pamphlets propagating his ideas. His The Confessions of a Capitalist in which he rejected the labour theory of value and argued that wealth is a by-product of exchange, was originally published in 1925 and was still in print twenty years later, after selling a quarter of a million copies.

Benn admired Samuel Smiles, the nineteenth-century liberalist author, and in a letter to The Times Benn claimed ideological descent from leading classical liberals: "In the ideal state of affairs, no one would record a vote in an election until he or she had read the eleven volumes of Jeremy Bentham and the whole of the works of John Stuart Mill, Herbert Spencer and Bastiat as well as Morley's Life of Cobden".

Benn served as High Sheriff of the County of London in 1932. In 1933 and 1934 he was president of the Printers' Pension Corporation. He was president of the Advertising Association in 1936.

Benn was also a member of the Reform Club and a founder of what would become the Society for Individual Freedom.

=== Last years ===
Sir Ernest Benn died in hospital on 17 January 1954 at Oxted, Surrey, aged 78. His eldest son, John Andrews Benn (1904–1984), succeeded him as 3rd Baronet.

== Quotes ==
"Politics is the art of looking for trouble, finding it everywhere, diagnosing it wrongly and applying unsuitable remedies".

A paraphrased variation of Benn's quote has been attributed to Groucho Marx: "Politics is the art of looking for trouble, finding it, misdiagnosing it and then misapplying the wrong remedies".

== Books ==
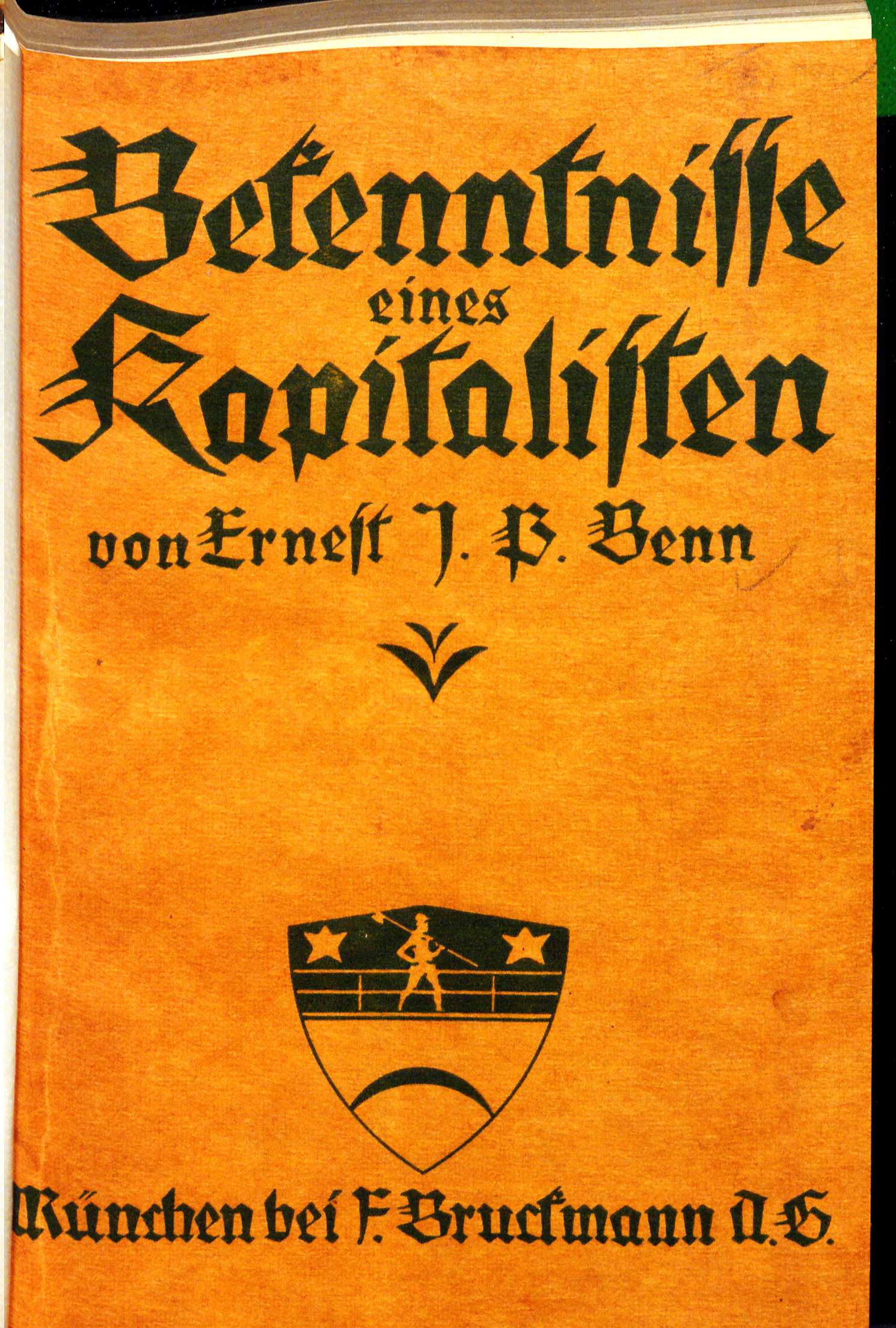
A German edition of Benn's Confessions of a Capitalist (1926).

- The Trade of To-morrow, (London: Jarrolds Publishers (London) Limited, 1917; New York: E. P. Dutton & Co., 1918)
- The Trade as a Science (London: Jarrold & Sons, c. 1917)
- Trade Parliaments and their Work (London: Nisbet & Co. Ltd., 1918)
- Confessions of a Capitalist (London: Hutchinson, 1925; London: Ernest Benn Limited, 1948)
- If I Were a Labour Leader (New York: C. Scribner's Sons, 1926)
- The Return to Laisser Faire (New York: D. Appleton & Company, 1929)
- About Russia (New York: D. Appleton and Co., 1930)
- Debt (London: Ernest Benn Limited, 1938)
- Happier Days: Recollections and Reflections (London: Ernest Benn Limited, 1949)
- Governed to Death (London: Society of Individualists, 1948; New York: National Economic Council, 1949)
- The State, the Enemy (London: Ernest Benn Limited, 1953)

== Arms ==
Coat of arms of Benn baronets of the Old Knoll, Metropolitan Borough of Lewisham
| Crest On a rock a spear erect proper, flowing therefrom a pennon azure, charged with the word “Onward”, letters or. Escutcheon Argent, two barrulets indented gules, between in chief as many dragons’ heads erased and in base a pencil and a pen in saltire proper, tied with a lace azure, pendent therefrom a torteau, charged with a figure “1914” or. Motto Deo Favente (By God's favour). |

== Notes ==
Sources

- Ernest Benn (1925), The Confessions of a Capitalist (1948 edition), London: Ernest Benn Ltd.

Honorary titles
| Preceded by The Hon. Alexander Shaw | High Sheriff of the County of London; 1932–1933 | Succeeded by Charles Hambro |
Baronetage of the United Kingdom
| Preceded by John Benn | Baronet (of Old Knoll); 1922–1954 | Succeeded by John Benn |
