= Benton County =

Benton County is the name of nine counties in the United States:

- Benton County, Arkansas
- Benton County, Indiana
- Benton County, Iowa
- Benton County, Minnesota
- Benton County, Mississippi
- Benton County, Missouri
- Benton County, Oregon
- Benton County, Tennessee
- Benton County, Washington
- Calhoun County, Alabama was established as Benton County in 1832, and renamed in 1858.
- Hernando County, Florida was named Benton County from 1844 through 1850.
