= James R. Benn =

American author

- Born: James Robert Benn; September 5, 1949 (age 76); New York City, U.S.
- Education: Southington High School; University of Connecticut; Southern Connecticut State University (MLS)
- Occupation: Writer
- Spouse: Deborah Mandel
- Children: two sons, seven grandchildren
- Writing career
- Genres: Mystery; Historical fiction
- Notable work: Billy Boyle series

James R. Benn (born September 5, 1949) is an American author, best known for the Billy Boyle World War II Mystery Series.

== Personal life ==
Benn was born on September 5, 1949, in New York City, New York to parents Harold Joseph and Gertrude Ross Benn. He grew up in Southington, Connecticut. After graduation from Southington High School in 1967 Benn attended the University of Connecticut, where he earned a bachelor's degree. He also holds a Master of Library Science (MLS) from Southern Connecticut State University. From 1969 to 1971 Benn was a VISTA volunteer.

Benn did not begin his writing career until age fifty. Prior to that he served as head of information for the West Hartford Public Schools in West Hartford, Connecticut. Benn retired as the director of the Godfrey Memorial Library, a private family history library in Middletown, Connecticut, to write full-time in 2010. Benn is married to Deborah Mandel, a psychotherapist. They have two sons and seven grandchildren.

== Billy Boyle books ==
This series of books centers on fictional Boston Police Department detective Billy Boyle. He comes from a family line of cops with Irish Republican leanings. When America enters World War Two his father and others fear he will be killed defending the hated British, as was his uncle in World War One. Calling on family connections they arrange for Billy to be assigned to the staff of a cousin's husband, a little-known Army officer named Dwight D. Eisenhower. “Uncle Ike”, as he is called in private, is soon promoted and takes Boyle with him as a staff investigator to solve crimes that require not only professionalism but discretion. Far from the safe stateside job his family back in Boston hoped for, Billy finds himself in great danger on every assignment.

The series was visible in the background of the HBO series, Curb Your Enthusiasm, Season 11, episode 1 (timestamp 29:40).

=== Other characters ===
- Lieutenant Baron Piotr Augustus Kazimierz: Known as "Kaz", he was attending school in the United Kingdom when the Germans invaded Poland in 1939. His family all killed by the Nazis, Kaz joins the Polish government-in-exile and is assigned to Eisenhower's staff as a translator. He quickly develops a strong friendship with Billy and can often be found at his side in times of danger.
- Daphne Seaton: Assigned to the Allied staff, she becomes the love interest of Kaz as well as Billy's assistant in the first investigation.
- Diane Seaton: Daphne's sister, and Billy Boyle's love interest. Haunted by memories of the Dunkirk evacuation, Diane joins the British SOE. A series of brutal missions behind enemy lines put not only her life in danger but her love with Boyle.
- Sam Harding: Major, later Colonel, Sam Harding is a by-the-book West Pointer who is Boyle's immediate commander. As the book series progresses he proves to be not only an able leader but someone of great loyalty, willing to take risks to protect Billy, Kaz, and the others under his command.

=== The books ===
- 1) The first novel in the series, Billy Boyle, was published by Soho Press in 2006. Second Lieutenant Boyle is charged with investigating a crime that endangers Allied operations in Norway and the Norwegian government-in-exile as well. Having hardly been out of Boston in his life, Billy ultimately finds himself behind the lines in occupied Norway, bent on stopping treason and avenging the death of a friend. The novel Billy Boyle was short-listed for the Dilys Award.
- 2) The second book in the series, The First Wave (2007), takes place during the invasion of French Northwest Africa in Operation Torch.
- 3) The third, Blood Alone, featured an amnesiac Billy Boyle during the invasion of Sicily, Operation Husky. He knows he must arrange for Mafia assistance to the invasion, but doesn't remember how.
- 4) The fourth book in the series, Evil For Evil, finds Billy Boyle wrestling with his conflicted feelings about the British, as he is sent to Northern Ireland to investigate the theft of Browning Automatic Rifles from an army base. The following review highlights this plot development.

"A twisting, turning plot drives Benn’s gripping fourth WWII mystery to feature Lt. Billy Boyle . . . As an Irish-American whose family is sympathetic to the Republican cause, Billy struggles to remain impartial as he investigates the various factions on both sides of the Catholic-Protestant divide. Benn offers no easy answers in this rich mix of Irish history and wartime intrigue."—Publishers Weekly

- 5) The fifth title in the series, Rag And Bone (September 2010) deals with the impact of the revelations concerning the Katyn Forest Massacre on the Allies, as a Soviet official is found murdered in London.
- 6) The sixth book in the series, A Mortal Terror (September 2011) finds Allied officers in Italy not only in danger from enemy action, but from being killed by one of their own men. A serial killer is on the loose, leaving a playing card with each body. Lieutenant Boyle struggles to capture him before the killer completes his royal flush.
- 7) The seventh book, Death's Door (September 2012) sees Billy and Kaz smuggled through enemy lines into Rome, where they must investigate the murder of an American monsignor in the neutral Vatican City. Publishers Weekly said “Benn’s nuanced portrayal of Vatican politics will keep readers turning the pages.”
- 8) The eighth Billy Boyle novel, A Blind Goddess, was released in September 2013. Set in pre-D Day England, it involves an old friend from Boston, strained race relations, and murder in an English village.
- 9) The ninth novel in the series was released in September 2014 titled The Rest Is Silence. Billy is sent to England to investigate a body that has washed ashore during rehearsals for the invasion of Normandy.
- 10) The tenth Billy Boyle novel, The White Ghost, was released in September 2015. Billy must discover if skipper and future president Jack Kennedy is a cold-blooded killer. It is set in the Pacific Solomons Islands Campaign.
- 11) The eleventh Billy Boyle novel, Blue Madonna, was released in September 2016. Billy is flown into France as part of a three-man team on June 5, 1944, the night before the Normandy invasion, to deliver a radio and weapons to the French Resistance and pick up a vital soldier.
- 12) The twelfth Billy Boyle novel, The Devouring, was released in September 2017. Billy and Kaz are sent to neutral Switzerland to investigate the death of a Swiss bank official and to investigate that the Swiss are storing gold stolen from Holocaust victims for the Nazis.
- 13) The thirteenth novel, Solemn Graves, was released in 2018. It deals in a double murder and the Ghost Army in Normandy after D-Day.
- 14) The fourteenth novel, When Hell Struck Twelve, was released in 2019. It is set during the Liberation of Paris, late August 1944.
- 15) The next novel, The Red Horse released in 2020, takes place immediately thereafter in a secret military hospital in Great Britain.
- 16) Road of Bones was released in 2021 and takes place in the Soviet Union.
- 17) From the Shadows came out in 2022 and follows the crew to Southern France where they look for collaborators alongside the Japanese-American 442nd Regiment.
- 18) Proud Sorrows, set in England, tells the tale of a murder amidst a plane crash. Released in 2023.

Benn has also written two stand-alone novels set during and after World War II - On Desperate Ground and Souvenir. On Desperate Ground, originally titled Desperate Ground, was Benn's first published novel, and the characters Billy Boyle and Colonel Sam Harding both appear in the book.
