= Benn baronets =

Baronetcy in the Baronetage of the United Kingdom

Sir John Benn, 1st Baronet

There have been three baronetcies created for people with the surname Benn, all in the Baronetage of the United Kingdom. As of 2014 one creation is extant.

The Benn Baronetcy, of The Old Knoll in the County of Surrey, was created in the Baronetage of the United Kingdom on 15 July 1914 for the politician John Benn. William Wedgwood Benn, 1st Viscount Stansgate, was the second son of the first Baronet.

The Benn Baronetcy, of Rollesby in the County of Norfolk, was created in the Baronetage of the United Kingdom on 17 June 1920 for Ion Hamilton Benn, who represented Greenwich in the House of Commons and also served on the London County Council. The title became extinct in 1992 on the death of his grandson, the second Baronet.

The Benn Baronetcy, of Bolton Gardens in the County of London, was created in the Baronetage of the United Kingdom on 26 July 1926 for Arthur Shirley Benn. He was later elevated to the peerage as Baron Glenravel. The titles became extinct on his death in 1937.

== Benn baronets, of The Old Knoll (1914) ==
Escutcheon of the Benn baronets of the Old Knoll

- Sir John Williams Benn, 1st Baronet (1850–1922)
- Sir Ernest John Pickstone Benn, 2nd Baronet (1875–1954)
- Sir John Andrews Benn, 3rd Baronet (1904–1984)
- Sir James Jonathan Benn, 4th Baronet (1933–2023)
- Sir Robert Ernest Benn, 5th Baronet (born 1963)

The heir apparent is the present holder's only son Alastair Frederick Benn (born 1995).

== Benn baronets, of Rollesby (1920) ==
Escutcheon of the Benn baronets of Rollesby

- Sir Ion Hamilton Benn, 1st Baronet (1863–1961)
- Sir Patrick Ion Hamilton Benn, 2nd Baronet (1922–1992)

== Benn baronets, of Bolton Gardens (1926) ==
- see the Baron Glenravel

== See also ==
- Viscount Stansgate

== Sources ==
- Leigh Rayment's list of baronets
