= Sir John Benn, 1st Baronet =

English politician (1850–1922)

Sir John Williams Benn Bt DL JP

MP for Devonport
- In office 20 June 1904 – 15 January 1910
- Preceded by: John Lockie
- Succeeded by: Sir John Jackson

MP for Tower Hamlets, St. George Division
- In office 4 July 1892 – 13 July 1895
- Preceded by: Charles Ritchie, 1st Baron Ritchie of Dundee
- Succeeded by: Harry Marks

Leader of the Progressive Party (for London County Council)
- In office 1908–1918
- Preceded by: T. McKinnon Wood
- Succeeded by: Rev. J. Scott Lidgett

Chairman of the London County Council
- In office 1904–1905
- Preceded by: Lord Monkswell
- Succeeded by: Sir Edwin Cornwall

Vice Chairman of the London County Council
- In office 1895–1896
- Preceded by: Charles Harrison
- Succeeded by: Dr William Collins

Councillor (London County Council)
- In office 1889–1922
- Constituency: Kennington (1898-1922); Finsbury East (1889-1898)

Personal details
- Born: 13 November 1850
- Died: 10 April 1922 (aged 71)
- Party: Liberal
- Other political affiliations: Progressive Party
- Spouse: Elizabeth Pickstone m. 1874
- Children: Sir Ernest John Pickstone Benn, 2nd Bt.; William Wedgwood Benn, 1st Viscount Stansgate; Christopher Julius Benn; Lilian Margaret Benn; Eliza Irene Benn; Captain Oliver Williams Benn †
- Parent(s): Rev. Julius Benn; Ann Taylor
- Relatives: William Rutherford Benn (brother); Margaret Rutherford (niece); Tony Benn (grandson)
- Family: Benn

Sir John Williams Benn, 1st Baronet, DL (13 November 1850 – 10 April 1922) was a British politician, particularly associated with London politics. He was the father of the politician William Benn and the grandfather of the politician Tony Benn.

== Life and career ==
Benn was born in Gerrards, Cheshire, which is now part of Gee Cross, Hyde, Greater Manchester, but his parents moved the family to east London the following year, where they opened an institute for homeless boys. Benn was largely homeschooled and at the age of seventeen, he joined a furniture company. He later (1880) established a trade journal, The Cabinet Maker, which eventually became the furniture trade's leading publication: when politics became his main interest, the family's publishing business, Benn Brothers, was taken over by his eldest son Ernest Benn (1875–1954), who later renamed it Ernest Benn Limited. His niece was actress Margaret Rutherford; she was the daughter of Benn's younger brother William Rutherford Benn, who was put into a lunatic asylum following his murder of their father, the Rev. Julius Benn.

When the London County Council was established in January 1889, Benn accepted an invitation to stand as a Progressive Party candidate for East Finsbury and was elected. Like his contemporary Will Crooks, Benn was active in the London Dock Strike of 1889, and, as an increasingly prominent local politician, was invited in 1891 to stand for Parliament as the Liberal Party candidate for St George Division of Tower Hamlets. He won election from the constituency the following year.

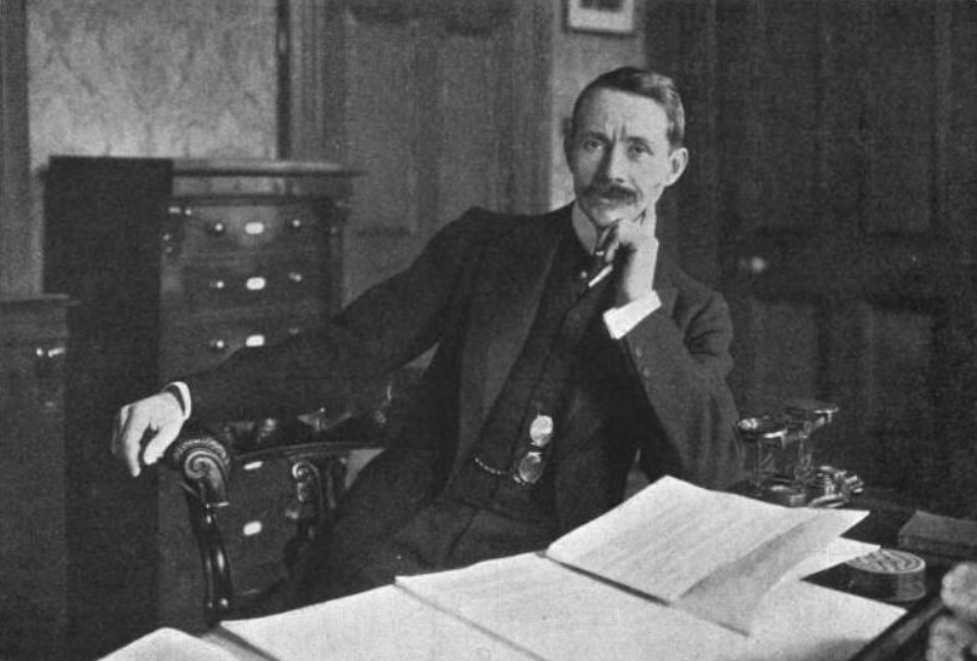
John Benn, 1904

He was later narrowly defeated at the general election in 1895, but he concentrated on his continuing work as a London councillor, helping introduce electric trams to London's streets in 1903. A year later, he returned to Parliament after winning a by-election at Devonport, a seat he retained until being defeated in 1910. In the meantime his son, 28-year-old William Wedgwood Benn, had also been elected to Parliament, winning Benn's former seat at St. George in 1906. Benn senior was appointed a deputy lieutenant of the County of London in February 1905.

For his work as an MP, he was knighted in 1906 and created a baronet in 1914.

Benn unsuccessfully stood as a candidate for Parliament 3 times over this period, for Deptford in its 1897 by-election, for Bermondsey in the 1900 general election and for Clapham in the December 1910 general election.

Benn led the Progressive Party from 1908 until ill-health forced him to relinquish the role in 1918 however he remained a member of the London County Council until his death in 1922. In his final election campaign he was victorious, defeating the Labour Group Leader.

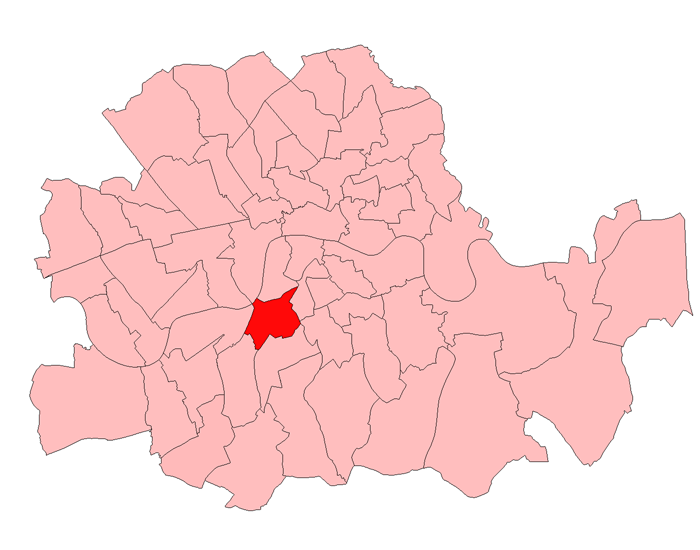
Kennington in the London County area 1918–49

1922 London County Council election: Kennington Electorate 31,838
Party	Candidate	Votes	%	±%
Municipal Reform	✓ Harold Swann	5,728	31.8	+12.5
Progressive	✓ John Benn	4,805	26.7	−4.6
Labour	Harry Gosling	4,275	23.7	−7.9
Labour	Charles Gibson	3,212	17.8	n/a
Majority		530	3.0	−9.0
Municipal Reform gain from Labour		Swing		
Progressive hold		Swing		

== Arms ==
Coat of arms of Benn baronets of the Old Knoll, Metropolitan Borough of Lewisham
Crest On a rock a spear erect proper, flowing therefrom a pennon azure, charged with the word "Onward", letters or. Escutcheon Argent, two barrulets indented gules, between in chief as many dragons' heads erased and in base a pencil and a pen in saltire proper, tied with a lace azure, pendent therefrom a torteau, charged with a figure "1914" or. Motto Deo Favente (By God's favour).

Parliament of the United Kingdom
Preceded by Charles Ritchie	Member of Parliament for Tower Hamlets, St George; 1892–1895	Succeeded by Harry Marks
Preceded by John Lockie; Hudson Kearley	Member of Parliament for Devonport; 1904–1910; With: Hudson Kearley	Succeeded by Sir John Jackson; Clement Kinloch-Cooke
Political offices
Preceded by Lord Monkswell	Chairman of the London County Council; 1903–1904	Succeeded by Sir Edwin Cornwall
Baronetage of the United Kingdom
New creation	Baronet (of Old Knoll); 1914–1922	Succeeded by Ernest Benn
Party political offices
Preceded by Thomas McKinnon Wood	Leader of the Progressive Party; 1908–1918	Succeeded by John Scott Lidgett
