= Plymouth Devonport =

Former UK Parliament constituency

Coordinates: 50.41°N 4.14°W

Plymouth, Devonport
- Former borough constituency for the House of Commons
- Boundary of Plymouth, Devonport in Devon for the 2005 general election

- Location of Devon within England
- County: Devon

1832–2010
- Seats: One
- Created from: Devon
- Replaced by: Plymouth Moor View, Plymouth Sutton and Devonport

Plymouth, Devonport was, from 1832 until 2010, a borough constituency represented in the House of Commons of the Parliament of the United Kingdom. It covered part of the city of Plymouth in South West England, including the former borough of Devonport.

== History ==
The constituency was created as Devonport in 1832, and elected two members until 1918, when the number was reduced to one. Following the amalgamation of Devonport into Plymouth, the constituency was renamed as Plymouth, Devonport.

Devonport has had a number of prominent MPs, including Leslie Hore-Belisha, Michael Foot (who began his Commons career in the seat), and the former SDP leader David Owen. One of its longest serving MPs was the National Liberal, later Conservative Dame Joan Vickers, who held the seat from 1955 until her defeat at the general election of February 1974.

=== Abolition ===
Following the Fifth Periodic Review of Westminster constituencies by the Boundary Commission for England, constituencies in Plymouth were reorganised, with both Plymouth Sutton and Plymouth Devonport being replaced by new constituencies of Plymouth Sutton and Devonport and Plymouth Moor View from 2010. The vast majority (nearly 90%) of the Plymouth Devonport constituency became part of the new Plymouth Moor View constituency; the exception was Devonport ward which became part of Plymouth Sutton and Devonport.

== Boundaries ==
1918–1950: The County Borough of Plymouth wards of Ford, Keyham, Molesworth, Nelson, St Aubyn, and St Budeaux.

1950–1951: The County Borough of Plymouth wards of Ford, Keyham, Molesworth, Mount Edgecumbe, Nelson, Pennycross, St Aubyn, St Budeaux, St Peter, and Stoke; and the parish of Tamerton Foliot in the Rural District of Plympton St Mary.

1951–1955: The County Borough of Plymouth wards of Ernesettle, Ford, Molesworth, Nelson, Peverell, St Aubyn, St Budeaux, St Peter, Stoke, Tamerton, and Trelawney.

1955–1974: The County Borough of Plymouth wards of Drake, Ernesettle, Ford, Molesworth, Nelson, St Andrew, St Aubyn, St Budeaux, St Peter, and Stoke.

1974–1983: The County Borough of Plymouth wards of Ernesettle, Ford, St Andrew, St Aubyn, St Budeaux, St Peter, and Stoke.

1983–1997: The City of Plymouth wards of Budshead, Estover, Ham, Honicknowle, Keyham, St Budeaux, and Southway.

1997–2010: The City of Plymouth wards of Budshead, Eggbuckland, Estover, Ham, Honicknowle, Keyham, St Budeaux, and Southway.

From 1950 to 1983, the constituency included Plymouth city centre.

== Members of Parliament ==
=== MPs 1832–1918 ===
Election	First member	First party	Second member	Second party
1832	Sir Edward Codrington	Whig	Sir George Grey	Whig
1840 by-election	Henry Tufnell	Whig	Sir George Grey	Whig
1847	Henry Tufnell	Whig	Sir John Romilly	Whig
1852	Henry Tufnell	Whig	Sir George Berkeley	Conservative
1854 by-election	Thomas Erskine Perry	Whig	Sir George Berkeley	Conservative
1857	Thomas Erskine Perry	Whig	James Wilson	Whig
1859	Thomas Erskine Perry	Liberal	James Wilson	Liberal
1859 by-election	Sir Michael Seymour	Liberal	James Wilson	Liberal
1859 by-election	Sir Michael Seymour	Liberal	Sir Arthur William Buller	Liberal
1863 by-election	William Ferrand	Conservative	Sir Arthur William Buller	Liberal
Jun 1865 by-election	William Ferrand	Conservative	Thomas Brassey	Liberal
Jul 1865	William Ferrand	Conservative	John Fleming	Conservative
1866 by-election	Lord Eliot	Liberal	Montague Chambers	Liberal
1868	John Delaware Lewis	Liberal	Montague Chambers	Liberal
1874	Sir John Henry Puleston	Conservative	George Edward Price	Conservative
1892	E. J. C. Morton	Liberal	Hudson Kearley	Liberal
1902 by-election	John Lockie	Conservative	Hudson Kearley	Liberal
1904 by-election	John Benn	Liberal	Hudson Kearley	Liberal
1910 (January)	Sir John Jackson	Conservative	Sir Clement Kinloch-Cooke	Conservative
1918	reduced to one seat			

=== MPs 1918–2010 ===
Election	Member	Party
1918	Clement Kinloch-Cooke	Coalition Conservative
1922	Clement Kinloch-Cooke	Conservative
1923	Leslie Hore-Belisha	Liberal
1931	Leslie Hore-Belisha	Liberal National
1942	Leslie Hore-Belisha	National Independent
1945	Michael Foot	Labour
1955	Dame Joan Vickers	Conservative and National Liberal
1964	Dame Joan Vickers	Conservative
Feb 1974	David Owen	Labour
1981	David Owen	SDP
1988	David Owen	'Continuing' SDP
1990	David Owen	Independent Social Democrat
1992	David Jamieson	Labour
2005	Alison Seabeck	Labour
2010	Constituency abolished: see Plymouth Moor View and Plymouth Sutton and Devonport	

== Elections ==
=== Elections in the 1830s ===
General election 1832: Devonport
Party	Candidate	Votes	%
Whig	George Grey	1,178	44.6
Whig	Edward Codrington	891	33.7
Whig	George Leach	575	21.7
Majority		316	12.0
Turnout		1,477	83.1
Registered electors		1,777	
Whig win (new seat)			
Whig win (new seat)			

General election 1835: Devonport
Party	Candidate	Votes	%	±%
Whig	Edward Codrington	1,114	39.3	+5.6
Whig	George Grey	956	33.7	−10.9
Conservative	George Robert Dawson	764	27.0	New
Majority		192	6.7	−5.3
Turnout		1,626	87.0	+3.9
Registered electors		1,870		
Whig hold				
Whig hold				

General election 1837: Devonport
Party	Candidate	Votes	%
Whig	Edward Codrington	Unopposed	
Whig	George Grey	Unopposed	
Registered electors		2,145	
Whig hold			
Whig hold			

Grey was appointed Judge Advocate General of the Armed Forces, requiring a by-election.

By-election, 20 February 1839: Devonport
Party	Candidate	Votes	%
Whig	George Grey	Unopposed	
Whig hold			

=== Elections in the 1840s ===
Codrington resigned by accepting the office of Steward of the Manor of East Hendred, causing a by-election.

By-election, 24 January 1840: Devonport
Party	Candidate	Votes	%
Whig	Henry Tufnell	974	56.5
Conservative	George Robert Dawson	750	43.5
Majority		224	13.0
Turnout		1,724	81.3
Registered electors		2,121	
Whig hold			

General election 1841: Devonport
Party	Candidate	Votes	%
Whig	Henry Tufnell	966	36.1
Whig	George Grey	932	34.8
Conservative	George Robert Dawson	780	29.1
Majority		152	5.7
Turnout		1,724	80.9
Registered electors		2,131	
Whig hold			
Whig hold			

Grey was appointed Home Secretary, requiring a by-election.

By-election, 10 July 1846: Devonport
Party	Candidate	Votes	%	±%
Whig	George Grey	Unopposed		
Whig hold				

General election 1847: Devonport
Party	Candidate	Votes	%	±%
Whig	Henry Tufnell	1,136	37.9	+1.8
Whig	John Romilly	1,022	34.1	−0.7
Conservative	Joseph Sandars	842	28.1	−1.0
Majority		180	6.0	+0.3
Turnout		1,921 (est)	82.0 (est)	+1.1
Registered electors		2,343		
Whig hold		Swing	+1.2	
Whig hold		Swing	−0.1	

Romilly was appointed Solicitor General for England and Wales, requiring a by-election.

By-election, 3 April 1848: Devonport
Party	Candidate	Votes	%	±%
Whig	John Romilly	Unopposed		
Whig hold				

=== Elections in the 1850s ===
Romilly was appointed Attorney General for England and Wales, requiring a by-election.

By-election, 17 July 1850: Devonport
Party	Candidate	Votes	%	±%
Whig	John Romilly	Unopposed		
Whig hold				

Romilly was appointed Master of the Rolls, requiring a by-election.

By-election, 2 April 1851: Devonport
Party	Candidate	Votes	%	±%
Whig	John Romilly	Unopposed		
Whig hold				

General election 1852: Devonport
Party	Candidate	Votes	%	±%
Whig	Henry Tufnell	1,079	25.6	−12.3
Conservative	George Berkeley	1,056	25.1	+11.0
Whig	John Romilly	1,046	24.8	−9.3
Conservative	John Heron-Maxwell	1,032	24.5	+10.4
Turnout		2,107 (est)	87.5 (est)	+5.5
Registered electors		2,407		
Majority		47	1.1	−4.9
Whig hold		Swing	−11.5	
Majority		10	0.3	N/A
Conservative gain from Whig		Swing	+10.9	

Tufnell resigned, causing a by-election.

By-election, 11 May 1854: Devonport
Party	Candidate	Votes	%	±%
Whig	Thomas Erskine Perry	1,091	61.3	+10.9
Conservative	John Heron-Maxwell	689	38.7	−10.9
Majority		402	22.6	+21.5
Turnout		1,780	73.6	−13.9
Registered electors		2,417		
Whig hold		Swing	+10.9	

General election 1857: Devonport
Party	Candidate	Votes	%	±%
Whig	Thomas Erskine Perry	Unopposed		
Whig	James Wilson	Unopposed		
Registered electors		2,628		
Whig hold				
Whig gain from Conservative				

General election 1859: Devonport
Party	Candidate	Votes	%	±%
Liberal	James Wilson	1,216	26.9	N/A
Liberal	Thomas Erskine Perry	1,198	26.5	N/A
Conservative	William Ferrand	1,075	23.7	New
Conservative	Archibald Peel	1,039	22.9	New
Majority		123	2.8	N/A
Turnout		2,264 (est)	82.1 (est)	N/A
Registered electors		2,759		
Liberal hold		Swing	N/A	
Liberal hold		Swing	N/A	

Wilson was appointed Vice-President of the Board of Trade, requiring a by-election.

By-election, 27 June 1859: Devonport
Party	Candidate	Votes	%	±%
Liberal	James Wilson	Unopposed		
Liberal hold				

Perry resigned after being appointed a member of the Council of India, causing a by-election.

By-election, 9 August 1859: Devonport
Party	Candidate	Votes	%	±%
Liberal	Michael Seymour	1,096	51.1	−2.3
Conservative	William Ferrand	1,047	48.9	+2.3
Majority		49	2.2	−0.6
Turnout		2,143	77.7	−4.4
Registered electors		2,759		
Liberal hold		Swing	−2.3	

Wilson resigned, causing a by-election.

By-election, 17 August 1859: Devonport
Party	Candidate	Votes	%	±%
Liberal	Arthur William Buller	1,189	51.6	−1.8
Conservative	William Ferrand	1,114	48.4	+1.8
Majority		75	3.2	+0.4
Turnout		2,303	83.5	+1.4
Registered electors		2,759		
Liberal hold		Swing	−1.8	

=== Elections in the 1860s ===
Seymour resigned, causing a by-election.

By-election, 12 February 1863: Devonport
Party	Candidate	Votes	%	±%
Conservative	William Ferrand	1,234	50.6	+4.0
Liberal	Frederick Grey	1,204	49.4	−4.0
Majority		30	1.2	N/A
Turnout		2,438	88.4	+6.3
Registered electors		2,758		
Conservative gain from Liberal		Swing	+4.0	

Buller resigned in order to contest the 1865 Liskeard by-election.

By-election, 22 June 1865: Devonport
Party	Candidate	Votes	%	±%
Liberal	Thomas Brassey	1,264	51.1	−2.3
Conservative	John Fleming	1,208	48.9	+2.3
Majority		56	2.2	−0.6
Turnout		2,472	87.7	+5.6
Registered electors		2,820		
Liberal hold		Swing	−2.3	

General election 1865: Devonport
Party	Candidate	Votes	%	±%
Conservative	John Fleming	1,307	25.5	+2.6
Conservative	William Ferrand	1,290	25.2	+1.5
Liberal	Thomas Brassey	1,279	25.0	−1.9
Liberal	Thomas Phinn	1,243	24.3	−2.2
Majority		11	0.2	N/A
Majority		64	1.2	N/A
Turnout		2,560 (est)	90.8 (est)	+8.7
Registered electors		2,820		
Conservative gain from Liberal		Swing	+2.4	
Conservative gain from Liberal		Swing	+1.8	

The election was declared void on petition, on account of bribery and corrupt practices, causing a by-election.

By-election, 22 May 1866: Devonport
Party	Candidate	Votes	%	±%
Liberal	William Eliot	1,275	25.6	+0.6
Liberal	Montague Chambers	1,269	25.5	+1.2
Conservative	Henry Cecil Raikes	1,216	24.4	−1.1
Conservative	Reginald Abbot	1,215	24.4	−0.8
Majority		53	1.1	N/A
Majority		60	1.2	N/A
Turnout		2,488 (est)	88.2 (est)	−2.6
Registered electors		2,820		
Liberal gain from Conservative		Swing	+0.9	
Liberal gain from Conservative		Swing	+1.0	

General election 1868: Devonport
Party	Candidate	Votes	%	±%
Liberal	John Delaware Lewis	1,541	26.6	+1.6
Liberal	Montague Chambers	1,519	26.2	+1.9
Conservative	William Ferrand	1,370	23.6	−1.6
Conservative	William Palliser	1,365	23.6	−1.9
Majority		149	2.6	N/A
Majority		176	3.0	N/A
Turnout		2,898 (est)	85.9 (est)	−4.9
Registered electors		3,374		
Liberal gain from Conservative		Swing	+1.6	
Liberal gain from Conservative		Swing	+1.9	

=== Elections in the 1870s ===
General election 1874: Devonport
Party	Candidate	Votes	%	±%
Conservative	John Henry Puleston	1,525	27.3	+3.7
Conservative	George Edward Price	1,483	26.6	+3.0
Liberal	John Delaware Lewis	1,327	23.8	−2.8
Liberal	George William Culme Soltau Symons	1,250	22.4	−3.8
Majority		156	2.8	N/A
Majority		275	4.9	N/A
Turnout		2,793 (est)	83.4 (est)	−2.5
Registered electors		3,348		
Conservative gain from Liberal		Swing	+3.3	
Conservative gain from Liberal		Swing	+3.4	

=== Elections in the 1880s ===
General election 1880: Devonport
Party	Candidate	Votes	%	±%
Conservative	John Henry Puleston	1,753	27.0	−0.3
Conservative	George Edward Price	1,746	26.9	+0.3
Liberal	John Delaware Lewis	1,509	23.3	−0.5
Liberal	Alexander Craig Sellar	1,476	22.8	+0.4
Majority		237	3.6	+0.8
Turnout		3,242 (est)	85.5 (est)	+2.1
Registered electors		3,790		
Conservative hold		Swing	+0.1	
Conservative hold		Swing	−0.1	

General election 1885: Devonport
Party	Candidate	Votes	%	±%
Conservative	George Edward Price	2,968	26.5	−0.4
Conservative	John Henry Puleston	2,944	26.3	−0.7
Liberal	George Webb Medley	2,653	23.7	+0.4
Liberal	Thomas Terrell	2,635	23.5	+0.7
Majority		291	2.6	−1.0
Turnout		5,646	86.5	+1.0 (est)
Registered electors		6,527		
Conservative hold		Swing	−0.6	
Conservative hold		Swing	−0.6	

General election 1886: Devonport
Party	Candidate	Votes	%	±%
Conservative	John Puleston	2,954	30.2	+3.9
Conservative	George Price	2,943	30.1	+3.6
Liberal	Charles Ford	1,963	20.1	−3.6
Liberal	Herbert Lionel Showers	1,918	19.6	−3.9
Majority		980	10.0	+7.4
Turnout		4,936	75.6	−10.9
Registered electors		6,527		
Conservative hold		Swing	+3.8	
Conservative hold		Swing	+3.8	

=== Elections in the 1890s ===
Kearley

General election 1892: Devonport
Party	Candidate	Votes	%	±%
Liberal	Hudson Kearley	3,354	26.4	+6.3
Liberal	E. J. C. Morton	3,325	26.3	+6.7
Conservative	George Price	3,012	23.8	−6.3
Conservative	Robert Harvey	2,972	23.5	−6.7
Majority		313	2.5	N/A
Majority		382	2.9	N/A
Turnout		6,378 (est)	83.6	+8.0
Registered electors		7,629		
Liberal gain from Conservative		Swing	+6.3	
Liberal gain from Conservative		Swing	+6.7	

Morton

General election 1895: Devonport
Party	Candidate	Votes	%	±%
Liberal	Hudson Kearley	3,570	26.2	−0.2
Liberal	E. J. C. Morton	3,511	25.7	−0.6
Conservative	Pridham Henry Pridham Whippell	3,303	24.2	+0.4
Conservative	TU Thynne	3,263	23.9	+0.4
Majority		208	1.5	−1.0
Turnout		6,875 (est)	86.9	+3.3
Registered electors		7,911		
Liberal hold		Swing	−0.3	
Liberal hold		Swing	−0.5	

=== Elections in the 1900s ===
General election 1900: Devonport
Party	Candidate	Votes	%	±%
Liberal	Hudson Kearley	3,626	25.9	−0.3
Liberal	E. J. C. Morton	3,538	25.2	−0.5
Conservative	John Lockie	3,458	24.7	+0.5
Conservative	F McCormick Goodheart	3,394	24.2	+0.3
Majority		80	0.5	−1.0
Turnout		14,016	85.1	−1.8
Registered electors		8,351		
Liberal hold		Swing	−0.4	
Liberal hold		Swing	−0.4	

1902 Devonport by-election
Party	Candidate	Votes	%	±%
Conservative	John Lockie	3,785	50.2	+1.3
Liberal	Thomas Brassey	3,757	49.8	−1.3
Majority		28	0.4	N/A
Turnout		7,542	84.3	−0.8
Registered electors		8,946		
Conservative gain from Liberal		Swing	+1.3	

John Benn

1904 Devonport by-election
Party	Candidate	Votes	%	±%
Liberal	John Benn	6,219	54.6	+3.5
Conservative	John Jackson	5,179	45.4	−3.5
Majority		1,040	9.2	+8.7
Turnout		11,398	79.3	−5.8
Registered electors		14,379		
Liberal hold		Swing	+3.5	

General election 1906: Devonport
Party	Candidate	Votes	%	±%
Liberal	Hudson Kearley	6,923	29.1	+3.2
Liberal	John Benn	6,527	27.5	+2.3
Conservative	John Jackson	5,239	22.0	−2.7
Conservative	F Holme-Summer	5,080	21.4	−2.8
Majority		1,288	5.5	+5.0
Turnout		23,769	81.4	−3.7
Registered electors		14,978		
Liberal hold		Swing	+3.0	
Liberal hold		Swing	+2.5	

=== Elections in the 1910s ===
General election January 1910: Devonport
Party	Candidate	Votes	%	±%
Conservative	John Jackson	5,658	26.7	+4.7
Conservative	Clement Kinloch-Cooke	5,286	24.9	+3.5
Liberal	John Benn	5,146	24.2	−3.3
Liberal	Samuel Lithgow	5,140	24.2	−4.9
Majority		140	0.7	N/A
Majority		518	2.5	N/A
Turnout		21,230	89.2	+7.8
Registered electors		12,125		
Conservative gain from Liberal		Swing	+4.0	
Conservative gain from Liberal		Swing	+4.2	

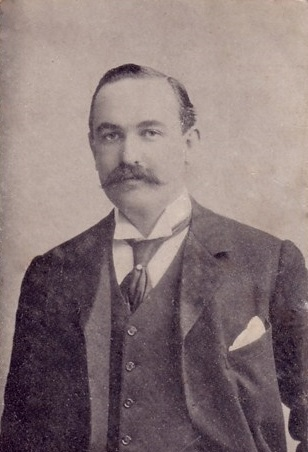
Godfrey Baring

General election December 1910: Devonport
Party	Candidate	Votes	%	±%
Conservative	John Jackson	5,170	26.0	−0.7
Conservative	Clement Kinloch-Cooke	5,111	25.7	+0.8
Liberal	Samuel Lithgow	4,841	24.3	+0.1
Liberal	Godfrey Baring	4,782	24.0	−0.2
Majority		270	1.4	+0.7
Turnout		19,904	83.0	−6.2
Registered electors		12,125		
Conservative hold		Swing	−0.4	
Conservative hold		Swing	+0.5	

General Election 1914–15:

Another General Election was required to take place before the end of 1915. The political parties had been making preparations for an election to take place and by July 1914, the following candidates had been selected;

- Unionist: Clement Kinloch-Cooke, John Jackson
- Liberal: Samuel Lithgow
- Labour:

General election 1918: Plymouth Devonport
Party		Candidate	Votes	%	±%
C	Unionist	Clement Kinloch-Cooke	13,240	62.2	+10.5
	Labour	Fred Bramley	4,115	19.3	New
	Liberal	Samuel Lithgow	3,930	18.5	−19.8
Majority			9,125	42.9	+41.5
Turnout			21,285	67.2	−15.8
	Unionist hold		Swing	+15.2	
C indicates candidate endorsed by the coalition government.

=== Elections in the 1920s ===
General election 1922: Plymouth Devonport
Party	Candidate	Votes	%	±%
Unionist	Clement Kinloch-Cooke	10,459	42.3	−19.9
Liberal	Leslie Hore-Belisha	8,538	34.5	+16.0
Labour	Barrington Bates	5,742	23.2	+3.9
Majority		1,921	7.8	−35.1
Turnout		24,739	79.1	+11.9
Unionist hold		Swing		

General election 1923: Plymouth Devonport
Party	Candidate	Votes	%	±%
Liberal	Leslie Hore-Belisha	12,269	45.7	+11.2
Unionist	Clement Kinloch-Cooke	10,428	38.8	−3.5
Labour	Joseph Harris	4,158	15.5	−7.7
Majority		1,841	6.9	N/A
Turnout		26,855	82.7	+3.6
Liberal gain from Unionist		Swing	+7.3	

General election 1924: Plymouth Devonport
Party	Candidate	Votes	%	±%
Liberal	Leslie Hore-Belisha	11,115	39.7	−6.0
Unionist	Samuel Gluckstein	10,534	37.6	−1.2
Labour	Holford Knight	6,350	22.7	+7.2
Majority		581	2.1	−4.8
Turnout		27,999	84.4	+1.7
Liberal hold		Swing	-2.4	

General election 1929: Plymouth Devonport
Party	Candidate	Votes	%	±%
Liberal	Leslie Hore-Belisha	15,233	45.7	+6.0
Unionist	Samuel Gluckstein	10,688	32.0	−5.6
Labour	Donald B. Fraser	7,428	22.3	−0.4
Majority		4,545	13.7	+11.6
Turnout		33,349	82.3	−2.1
Liberal hold		Swing	+5.8	

=== Elections in the 1930s ===
General election 1931: Plymouth Devonport
Party	Candidate	Votes	%	±%
National Liberal	Leslie Hore-Belisha	23,459	72.19	
Labour	Paul Reed	9,039	27.81	
Majority		14,420	44.38	
Turnout		32,498	78.18	
National Liberal hold		Swing		

General election 1935: Plymouth Devonport
Party	Candidate	Votes	%	±%
National Liberal	Leslie Hore-Belisha	20,852	68.13	−4.06
Labour	John Brown	9,756	31.87	+4.06
Majority		11,096	36.26	−8.12
Turnout		30,608	72.27	−5.91
National Liberal hold		Swing	+4.06	

General Election 1939–40:

Another General Election was required to take place before the end of 1940. The political parties had been making preparations for an election to take place from 1939 and by the end of this year, the following candidates had been selected;

- Liberal National: Leslie Hore-Belisha
- Labour: Michael Foot

=== Elections in the 1940s ===
General election 1945: Plymouth Devonport
Party	Candidate	Votes	%	±%
Labour	Michael Foot	13,395	54.06	+22.19
National	Leslie Hore-Belisha	11,382	45.94	−22.19
Majority		2,013	8.12	N/A
Turnout		24,777	71.11	−1.16
Labour gain from National Liberal		Swing	+22.19	

=== Elections in the 1950s ===
General election 1950: Plymouth, Devonport
Party	Candidate	Votes	%	±%
Labour	Michael Foot	30,812	50.59	−3.47
National Liberal	Randolph Churchill	27,329	44.87	−1.07
Liberal	Alfred Charles Cann	2,766	4.54	New
Majority		3,483	5.72	−2.40
Turnout		60,907	87.16	+16.05
Labour hold		Swing	-1.20	

General election 1951: Plymouth, Devonport
Party	Candidate	Votes	%	±%
Labour	Michael Foot	32,158	51.93	+1.34
National Liberal	Randolph Churchill	29,768	48.07	+3.20
Majority		2,390	3.86	−1.86
Turnout		61,926	85.28	−1.88
Labour hold		Swing	-0.93	

General election 1955: Plymouth, Devonport
Party	Candidate	Votes	%	±%
National Liberal	Joan Vickers	24,821	47.15	−0.92
Labour	Michael Foot	24,721	46.96	−4.97
Liberal	Arthur Russell Mayne	3,100	5.89	New
Majority		100	0.19	N/A
Turnout		52,642	77.15	−8.13
National Liberal gain from Labour		Swing	+2.03	

General election 1959: Plymouth, Devonport
Party	Candidate	Votes	%	±%
National Liberal	Joan Vickers	28,481	56.39	+9.24
Labour	Michael Foot	22,027	43.61	−3.35
Majority		6,454	12.78	+12.59
Turnout		50,508	78.63	+1.48
National Liberal hold		Swing	+6.26	

=== Elections in the 1960s ===
General election 1964: Plymouth, Devonport
Party	Candidate	Votes	%	±%
Conservative	Joan Vickers	24,241	54.04	−2.35
Labour	Rowland Edward Crabb	20,615	45.96	+2.35
Majority		3,626	8.08	−4.70
Turnout		44,856	73.58	−5.05
Conservative hold		Swing	–2.35	

General election 1966: Plymouth, Devonport
Party	Candidate	Votes	%	±%
Conservative	Joan Vickers	22,760	50.35	−3.69
Labour	Rowland Edward Crabb	22,441	49.65	+3.69
Majority		319	0.70	−7.38
Turnout		45,201	76.21	+2.73
Conservative hold		Swing	–3.69	

=== Elections in the 1970s ===
General election 1970: Plymouth, Devonport
Party	Candidate	Votes	%	±%
Conservative	Joan Vickers	21,843	51.62	+1.27
Labour	F Keith Taylor	20,471	48.38	−1.27
Majority		1,372	3.24	+2.54
Turnout		42,314	70.95	−5.26
Conservative hold		Swing	+1.27	

General election February 1974: Plymouth, Devonport
Party	Candidate	Votes	%	±%
Labour	David Owen	15,819	42.2	−6.2
Conservative	Joan Vickers	15,382	41.0	−10.6
Liberal	Nicholas Westbrook	6,298	16.8	New
Majority		437	1.2	N/A
Turnout		37,499	75.3	+4.4
Labour gain from Conservative		Swing	+2.2	

General election October 1974: Plymouth, Devonport
Party	Candidate	Votes	%	±%
Labour	David Owen	17,398	47.3	+5.1
Conservative	Joan Vickers	15,139	41.1	+0.1
Liberal	N E Westbrook	3,953	10.7	−6.1
Independent Liberal	J N Hill	312	0.9	New
Majority		2,259	6.2	+5.0
Turnout		36,490	73.5	−1.8
Labour hold		Swing	+2.5	

General election 1979: Plymouth, Devonport
Party	Candidate	Votes	%	±%
Labour	David Owen	16,545	47.4	+0.1
Conservative	Kenneth Hughes	15,544	44.6	+3.5
Liberal	Michael James	2,360	6.8	−3.9
National Front	Leonard Bearsford-Walker	243	0.7	New
Independent	Richard Stoner	203	0.6	New
Majority		1,001	2.8	−2.4
Turnout		34,895	72.3	−1.2
Labour hold		Swing	−1.7	

=== Elections in the 1980s ===
General election 1983: Plymouth, Devonport
Party	Candidate	Votes	%	±%
SDP (Alliance)	David Owen	20,843	44.3	
Conservative	Ann Widdecombe	15,907	33.8	
Labour	Julian Priestley	9,845	21.0	
Ind. Conservative	James Sullivan	292	0.6	
BNP	Robert Bearsford-Walker	72	0.2	
Christian Democrat	Faith Hill	51	0.1	
Majority		4,936	10.5	
Turnout		47,010	76.1	
SDP gain from Labour		Swing		

- This constituency underwent boundary changes between the 1979 and 1983 general elections and thus calculation of change in vote share is not meaningful.

General election 1987: Plymouth, Devonport
Party	Candidate	Votes	%	±%
SDP (Alliance)	David Owen	21,039	42.3	−2.0
Conservative	Tom Jones	14,569	29.3	−4.5
Labour	Ian Flintoff	14,166	28.4	+7.4
Majority		6,470	13.0	+2.5
Turnout		49,774	77.2	+1.1
SDP hold		Swing	+3.3	

=== Elections in the 1990s ===
General election 1992: Plymouth, Devonport
Party	Candidate	Votes	%	±%
Labour	David Jamieson	24,953	48.7	+20.3
Conservative	Keith Simpson	17,541	34.3	+5.0
Liberal Democrats	Murdoch MacTaggart	6,315	12.3	−30.0
SDP	Harold Luscombe	2,152	4.2	New
Natural Law	Francis Lyons	255	0.5	New
Majority		7,412	14.4	+1.4
Turnout		51,216	77.8	+0.6
Labour gain from Ind. Social Democrat		Swing	+7.7	

General election 1997: Plymouth, Devonport
Party	Candidate	Votes	%	±%
Labour	David Jamieson	31,629	60.9	+13.8
Conservative	Anthony Johnson	12,562	24.2	−11.4
Liberal Democrats	Richard Corpus	5,570	10.7	−2.5
Referendum	Clive Norsworthy	1,486	2.9	New
UKIP	Caroline Farrand	478	0.9	New
National Democrats	Stephen Ebbs	238	0.4	New
Majority		19,067	36.7	+25.2
Turnout		51,963	69.8	−9.0
Labour hold		Swing	+12.6	

This constituency underwent boundary changes between the 1992 and 1997 general elections and thus change in share of vote is based on a notional calculation.

=== Elections in the 2000s ===
General election 2001: Plymouth, Devonport
Party	Candidate	Votes	%	±%
Labour	David Jamieson	24,322	58.3	−2.6
Conservative	John Glen	11,289	27.1	+2.9
Liberal Democrats	Keith Baldry	4,513	10.8	+0.1
UKIP	Michael Parker	958	2.3	+1.4
Socialist Alliance	Tony Staunton	334	0.8	New
Socialist Labour	Rob Hawkins	303	0.7	New
Majority		13,033	31.2	−5.5
Turnout		41,719	56.6	−13.2
Labour hold		Swing	−2.7	

General election 2005: Plymouth, Devonport
Party	Candidate	Votes	%	±%
Labour	Alison Seabeck	18,612	44.3	−14.0
Conservative	Richard Cuming	10,509	25.0	−2.1
Liberal Democrats	Judith Jolly	8,000	19.1	+8.3
UKIP	Bill Wakeham	3,324	7.9	+5.6
Independent	Keith Greene	747	1.8	New
Socialist Labour	Rob Hawkins	445	1.1	+0.4
Respect	Tony Staunton	376	0.9	New
Majority		8,103	19.3	―11.9
Turnout		41,982	57.6	+1.0
Labour hold		Swing	−6.0	

== See also ==
- List of parliamentary constituencies in Devon

== Notes and references ==
Craig, F. W. S. (1983). British parliamentary election results 1918–1949 (3 ed.). Chichester: Parliamentary Research Services. ISBN 0-900178-06-X.
