= John Henry Puleston =

British politician

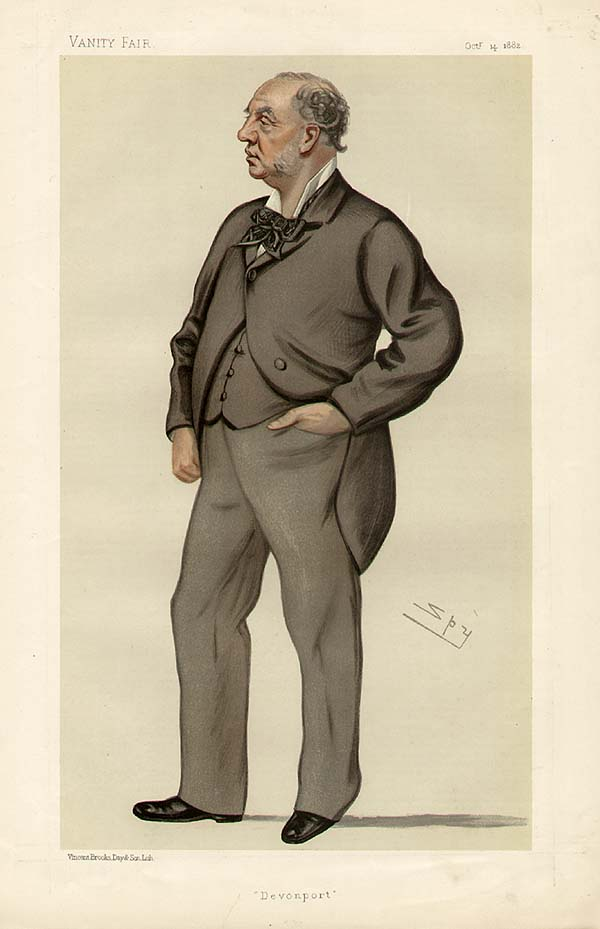
"Devonport" Puleston as caricatured by Spy (Leslie Ward) in Vanity Fair, October 1882

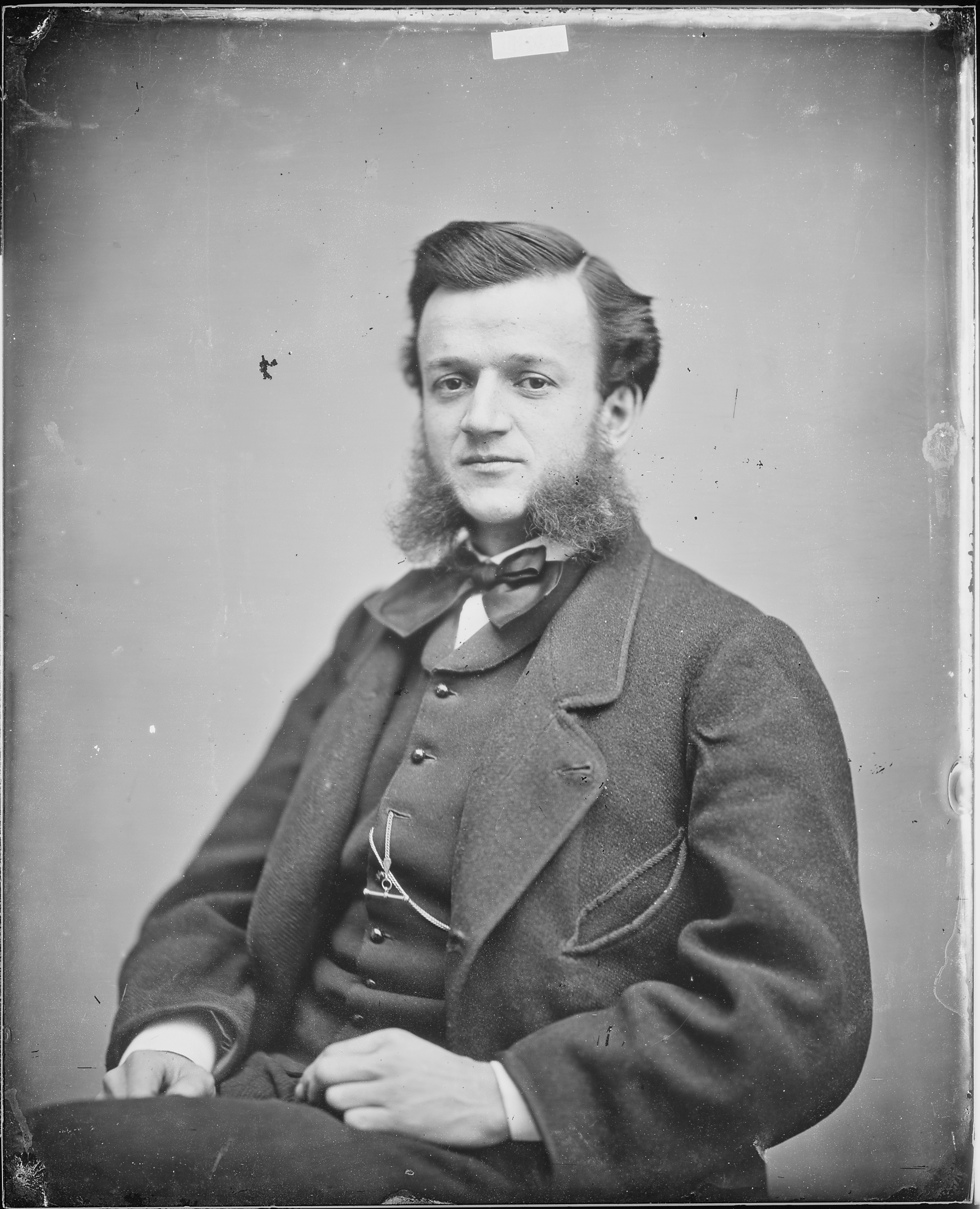
Mathew Brady photo taken of Puleston during his time in the United States

Sir John Henry Puleston (2 June 1830 – 19 October 1908) was a Welsh journalist and entrepreneur in the United States and later a Conservative politician who represented Devonport.

== Biography ==
Puleston was born at Plasnewydd the son of John Puleston, a prosperous farmer of Llanfair Dyffryn Clwyd, and his wife Mary Jones. He was educated at Ruthin Grammar School and King's College London. He went to America where he began by trying to establish a medical practice in New York. This was unsuccessful but he became acquainted with Governor Morgan and became involved in politics. He applied to Horace Greeley to become a political missionary for the Republican Party among Welsh miners in Pennsylvania. Turning to journalism, he edited a Welsh newspaper at Scranton, and purchased the Pittston Gazette. He was then editor of the Phoenixville Guardian for a short time, but departed from the town leaving debts. He invested in railroads and developed his political contacts. Puleston managed to obtain the role of secretary to a Peace Commission established prior to the American Civil War and achieved a national reputation, presenting reports to Abraham Lincoln and the House of Representatives. When the American Civil War broke out, Governor Curtin appointed Puleston as military agent for the state of Pennsylvania with the rank of Colonel. He later drew a lucrative salary as secretary of Butterfield's Overland Express Company, and then became a broker on Wall Street with the firm Raymond, Puleston & Co. He was associated with Jay Cooke, McCullogh & Co, bankers and returned to London.

In 1874 Puleston was elected as one of the MPs for Plymouth Devonport, for which he sat until 1892. In 1879 as MP visiting Philadelphia he was reminded of his debts, and hunted them down and repaid them all. He was chairman City of London Conservative Association and Treasurer of the Royal Asylum of St Anne's Society. He was awarded a knighthood in 1887.

He was cited to be one of the founder-directors of the proposed South Kensington and Paddington underground railway.

On 12 September 1901 he was appointed a director of the Great Northern, Piccadilly and Brompton Railway Company. He resigned from that position on 13 January 1903.

Puleston died a bankrupt.

== Family ==
Puleston married, in 1857, Margaret, the daughter of Rev. Edward Loyd, Llanfyllin, Montgomeryshire. Lady Puleston took a keen interest in her husband's constituency at Devonport. She died, at Whitehall Court, 19 January 1902.

In July 1889 his eldest daughter married Edward Ashurst Morris (1863-1890) of Ashurst Morris, Crisp and Co.

Parliament of the United Kingdom
| Preceded by Lord Eliot; John Delaware Lewis | Member of Parliament for Devonport; 1874 – 1892; With: George Edward Price | Succeeded by Hudson Kearley; E. J. C. Morton |
