= Gang of Four (SDP) =

Breakaway group from UK Labour party in 1981

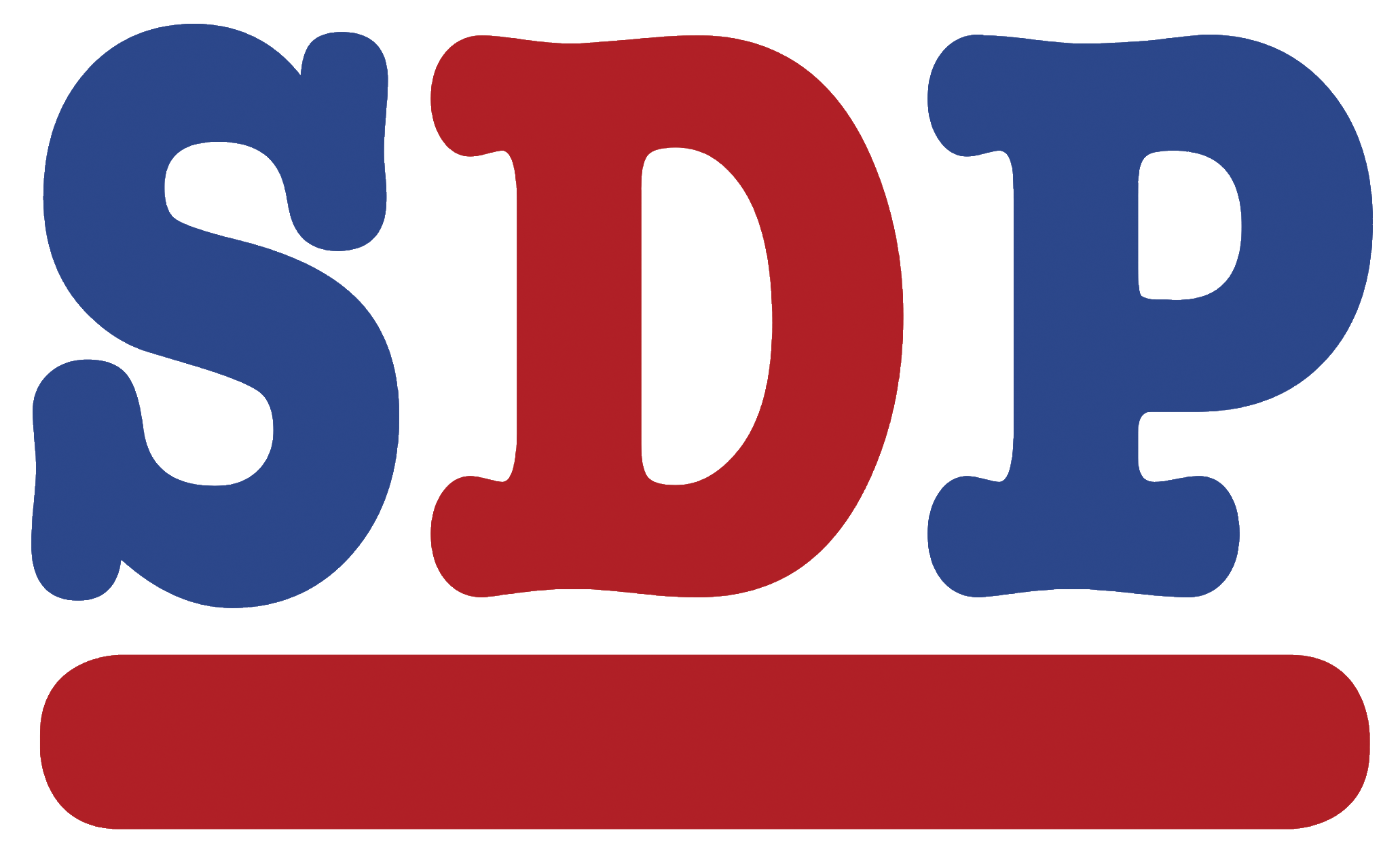
SDP logo

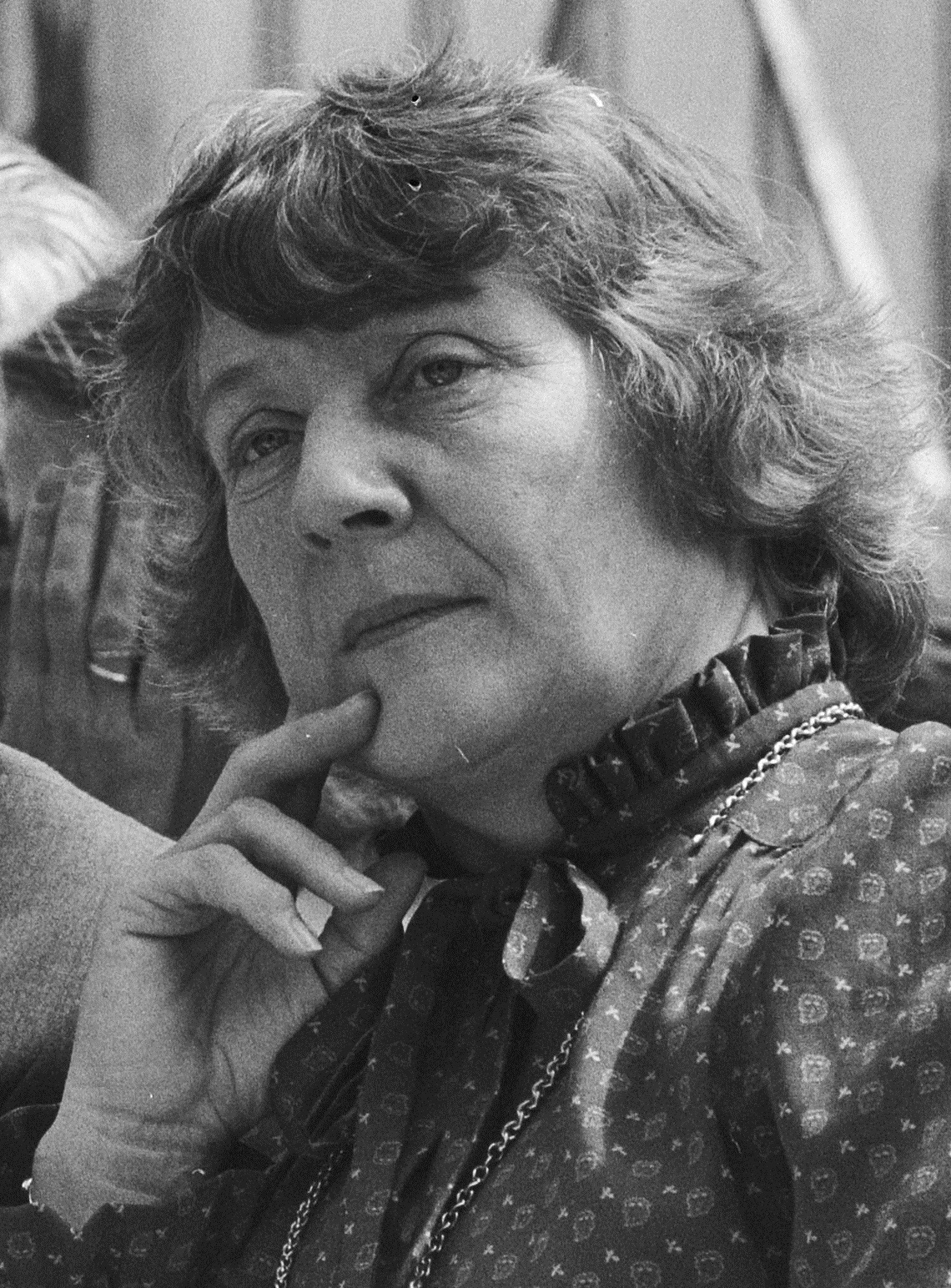
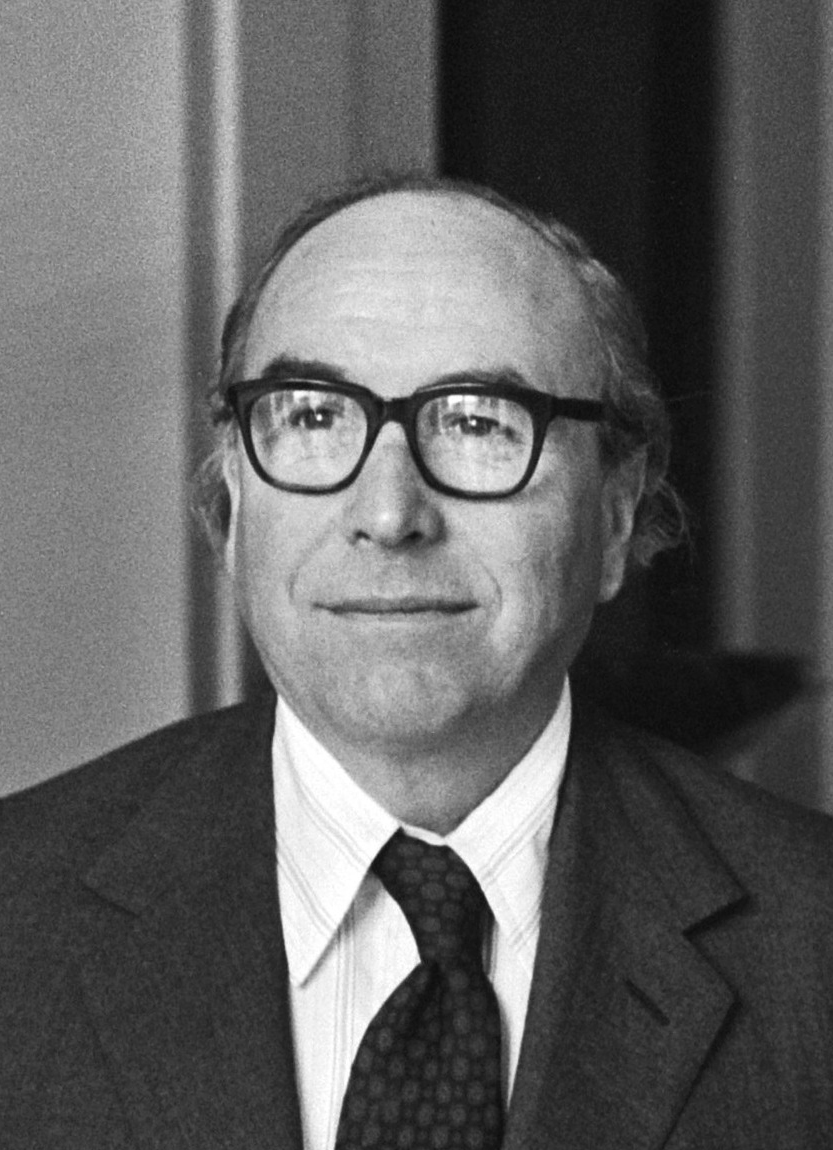
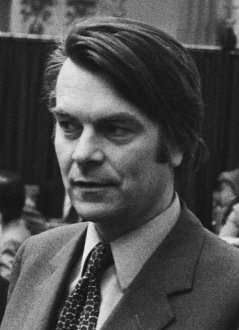
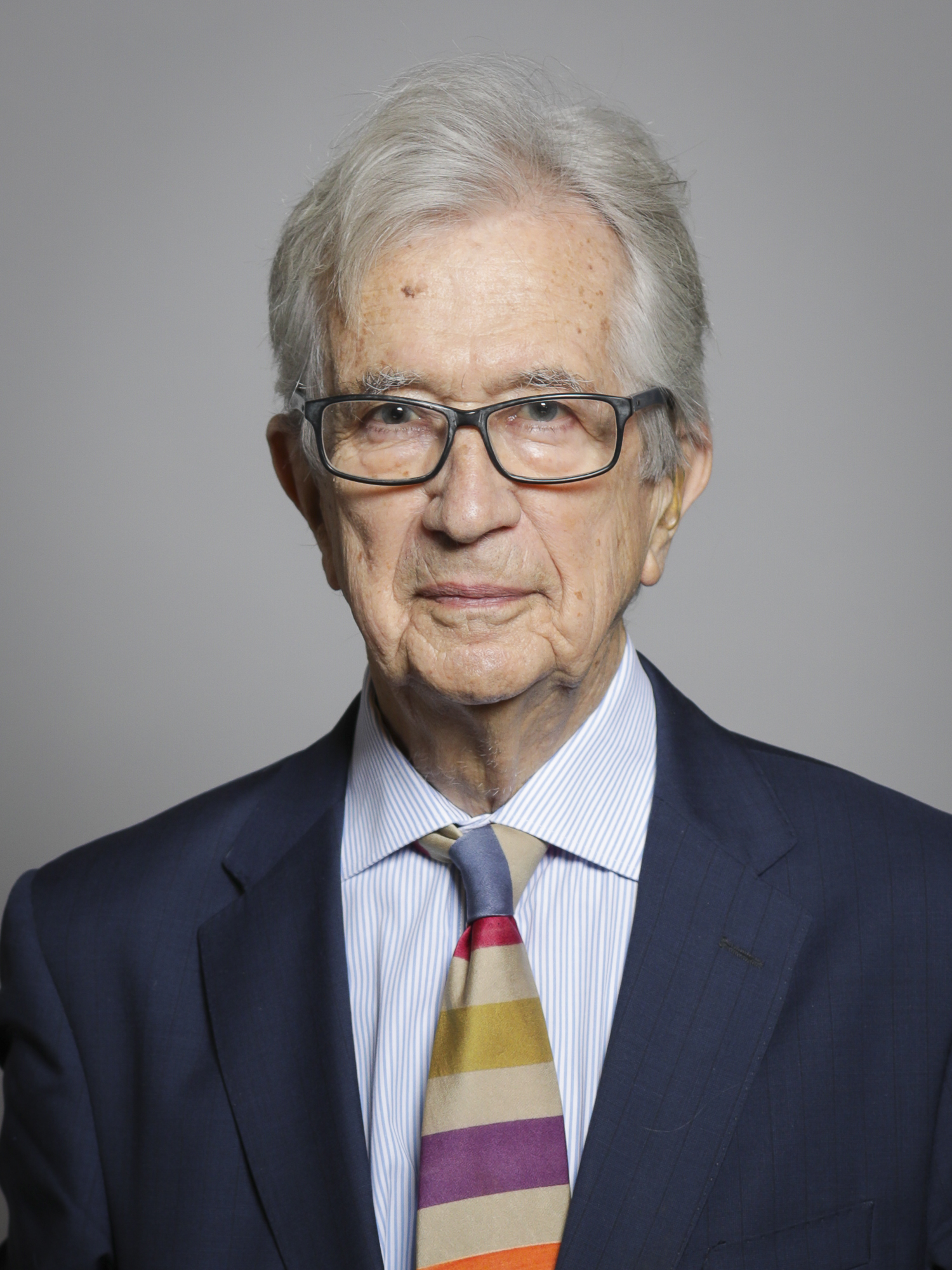
The gang of four, clockwise; Shirley Williams, Roy Jenkins, Bill Rodgers, David Owen

In UK politics, the Gang of Four was a breakaway group of four Labour politicians who founded the Social Democratic Party in 1981, including two sitting Labour MPs and a former deputy leader of the party.

The term Gang of Four is a reference to the political faction of four Chinese Communist Party officials who came to prominence during the Cultural Revolution (1966–1976) and were accused of attempting to seize power following the death of Mao Zedong.

== History ==
Bill Rodgers, Shirley Williams, Roy Jenkins and David Owen proposed a group called the Council for Social Democracy, which ended up becoming the Social Democratic Party. Their first public move was the Limehouse Declaration, named after the house in Limehouse where David Owen lived, and where the group met.

The Gang of Four were followed by a score of other Labour MPs.

== The Gang of Four ==
Name (Birth–death)	Portrait	Constituency	Previous office(s)
Roy Jenkins (1920–2003)		Glasgow Hillhead (from March 1982)	Deputy Leader of the Labour Party (1970–1972); Chancellor of the Exchequer (1967–1970); Home Secretary (1965–1967, 1974–1976); Minister of Aviation (1964–1965)
David Owen (born 1938)		Plymouth Devonport	Foreign Secretary (1977–1979); Minister of State for Foreign Affairs (1976–1977); Minister of State for Health and Social Security (1974–1976); Under-Secretary of State for the Navy (1968–1970)
Bill Rodgers (born 1928)		Stockton-on-Tees	Transport Secretary (1976–1979); Minister of State for Defence (1974–1976); Minister of State for the Treasury (1969–1970); Minister of State for Trade (1968–1969); Under-Secretary of State for Economic Affairs (1964–1967); Parliamentary Under-Secretary of State for Foreign Affairs (1967–1968)
Shirley Williams (1930–2021)		Crosby (from November 1981)	Education Secretary and Paymaster General (1976–1979); Prices and Consumer Secretary (1974–1976); Minister of State of Home Affairs (1969–1970); Minister of State for Education and Science (1967–1969); Parliamentary Secretary to the Minister for Housing and Local Government (1966–1967)

== Views and legacy ==
In March 2017, the three then-living members of the SDP Gang of Four all said Jeremy Corbyn should step down as leader before the next general election originally scheduled for 2020 under the Fixed-term Parliaments Act. In the 2017 general election, Labour under Corbyn again finished as the second-largest party in parliament, but the party increased their share of the popular vote to 40%, resulting in a net gain of 30 seats and a hung parliament.

In 2019, The Independent Group were described as similar to the Gang of Four, which was backed by Bill Rodgers.
