= Donald B. Fraser =

Donald Beaton Fraser (1868 – 16 November 1952) was a British religious minister and political activist.

Born in Windhill, Fraser was educated at Western College in Plymouth, and became a Unitarian minister, attached to Pembroke Chapel in Liverpool, and then from 1918, to St George's Chapel, in Exeter. He became well known for his preaching, and prominent in the Liberal Christian League.

Fraser joined the Labour Party, and stood it in Tiverton at the 1918 UK general election, taking third place, with 14.1% of the vote. He served on the executive of the Exeter Labour Party for many years, including a period as president. At the 1929 UK general election, he stood in Plymouth Devonport, again taking third place.
