= Society for the Maintenance of the Faith =

The Society for the Maintenance of the Faith is an Anglo-Catholic organization in the Church of England founded in 1873. As of 2022, it holds 94 advowsons or rights of patronage for church appointments. The group in 1995 supported the idea of life-long appointments as a means of promoting diversity among the clergy. In 2025, it has 13 trustees and the registered charitable objects "to promote and maintain Catholic teaching and practice."

== Presidents ==
1. Lord Eliot (1873–1878)
2. Octavius Leefe (1878–1881, 1889–1901)
3. Lord Edward Spencer-Churchill (1881–1889, 1901–1911)
4. The Duke of Newcastle (1911–1928)
5. Lord Mamhead (1928–1945)
6. Sir Henry Slesser (1946–1948)
7. Sir John Best-Shaw (1949–1967)
8. Dr. Arthur Peck (1967–1974)
9. Dr. Paul Kent (1974–1999)
10. Dr. Brian Hanson CBE (1999–2018)
11. Dr. Colin Podmore MBE (2019–present; second term 2025-2028)
