= Colin Podmore =

English ecclesiastical historian and official (born 1960)

Colin Podmore MBE FRHistS
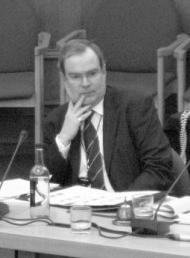
- Born: Colin John Podmore; 22 February 1960 (age 66); Redruth, Cornwall, England
- Education: Keble College, Oxford; Selwyn College, Cambridge
- Occupations: Ecclesiastical historian, ecclesiastical official
- Office: Clerk to the General Synod of the Church of England (2011–2013); Director of Forward in Faith (2013–2020); President of Society for the Maintenance of the Faith (since 2021)

Colin John Podmore MBE FRHistS (born 22 February 1960) is a Cornish ecclesiastical historian and a senior layperson in the Church of England. Between April 2013 and February 2020 he was the director of Forward in Faith, a traditionalist Anglo-Catholic organization within the church. He was previously the secretary of the House of Clergy of the General Synod (2002–2011) and clerk to the General Synod (2011–2013).

== Early life and education ==
Podmore was born on 22 February 1960 in Redruth, Cornwall. He studied history at Keble College, Oxford, and trained as a teacher at Selwyn College, Cambridge. After a period of work as a schoolteacher, he came back to the University of Oxford as a researcher to undertake a Doctor of Philosophy (DPhil) degree on the Moravian Church in England. His doctoral thesis was titled "The role of the Moravian Church in England 1728-1760" and was submitted in 1994. His thesis was subsequently published.

== Personal life ==
Podmore was brought up as a Methodist and attended Methodist Sunday school. He converted to Anglicanism at the age of 19 while at university; "partly because of the appeal of Catholic Anglican worship, and partly because of the feeling that, in the Church of England, you're identifying with the Christian tradition in this country going back to the Dark Ages".

== Honours ==
In 2002, Podmore was elected a Fellow of the Royal Historical Society (FRHistS). In June 2017, he was awarded the Lanfranc Award for Education and Scholarship by the Archbishop of Canterbury "for services to education and scholarship in support of the Church of England and the wider Church". In the 2020 Queen's Birthday Honours, he was appointed Member of the Order of the British Empire (MBE) for services to the Church of England. He is president of the Society for the Maintenance of the Faith, an Anglo-Catholic organization coordinating patronage in the Church of England.

== Selected works ==
- Hüffmeier, Wilhelm; Podmore, Colin (1996). Leuenberg, Meissen and Porvoo: Consultation between the Churches of the Leuenberg Church Fellowship and the Churches Involved in the Meissen Agreement and the Porvoo Agreement. Frankfurt: Lembeck. ISBN 978-3-87476-316-5.
- Colin Podmore (1998). The Moravian Church in England, 1728–1760. Oxford: Clarendon Press. ISBN 978-0-19-820725-2. (based on the author's D.Phil. thesis)
- Colin Podmore, ed. (1998). Community, Unity, Communion: Essays in Honour of Mary Tanner. London: Church House Publishing. ISBN 978-0-7151-5756-5.
- Prayers to Remember (Darton, Longman & Todd Ltd, 2001) ISBN 9780232524246
- Colin Podmore (2005). Aspects of Anglican Identity. London: Church House Publishing. ISBN 978-0-7151-4074-1.
- Roger Greenacre (2013). Colin Podmore (ed.). Maiden, Mother and Queen: Mary in the Anglican Tradition. Norwich, England: Hymns Ancient and Modern. ISBN 978-1-84825-278-3.
- Roger Greenacre (2014). Colin Podmore (ed.). Part of the One Church? The Ordination of Women and Anglican identity. Norwich, England: Canterbury Press. ISBN 978-1-84825-627-9.
- Colin Podmore, ed. (2015). Fathers in God? Resources for Reflection on Women in the Episcopate. Norwich, England: Canterbury Press. ISBN 978-1-84825-826-6.
