= George Edward Price =

George Edward Price (1842–1926) was a Royal Navy officer and a Conservative politician who represented Devonport.

Price was the son of George Price and Hon Emily Valentine Plunkett daughter of Edward Plunkett, 14th Baron Dunsany. He joined the Royal Navy and attained the rank of captain. In 1874 Price was elected MP for Plymouth Devonport and held the seat until 1892.

Price married Gertrude Laurence on 6 February 1873 and had several children. His residence was Carlton Hall at Carlton, Suffolk.

Parliament of the United Kingdom
Preceded by Lord Eliot; John Delaware Lewis	Member of Parliament for Devonport; 1874 – 1892; With: Sir John Puleston	Succeeded by Hudson Kearley; E. J. C. Morton
