= Advowson =

Right in English law to appoint clergy

Advowson (/ədˈvaʊzən/) or patronage is the right in English law of a patron (avowee) to present to the diocesan bishop (or in some cases the ordinary if not the same person) a nominee for appointment to a vacant ecclesiastical benefice or church living, a process known as presentation (jus praesentandi, Latin: "the right of presenting").

The word derives, via French, from the Latin advocare, from vocare "to call" plus ad, "to, towards", thus a "summoning". It is the right to nominate a person to be parish priest (subject to episcopal—that is, one bishop's—approval), and each such right in each parish was mainly first held by the lord of the principal manor. Many small parishes only had one manor of the same name.

== Origin ==
The creation of an advowson was a secondary development arising from the process of creating parishes across England in the 11th and 12th centuries, with their associated parish churches. A major impetus to this development was the legal exaction of agricultural tithes specific to the support of churches and their clergy; landowners needed to establish parish churches on their lands in order to retain tithe income within their estates, and to this purpose sought to raise former field churches to parish church status. This was generally performed by a lord of a manor by rebuilding a church within the boundary of his manor, or within that of a newly subinfeudated manor, and then transferring proprietary rights of certain individual named fields, mills or messuages (i.e. houses on the manor which earned rents) to establish a glebe.

Where parish churches existed on manors established before the Norman Conquest of 1066, the position is less clear and records generally are scarce from which to reconstruct a history. Britain was split into dioceses, however, and many parish churches were established long before that time, and the process of their creation was likely similarly performed by Anglo-Saxon thanes as by Norman lords and feudal barons. Initially feudal lords exercised seigneural dominium over these new parish churches, exacting an introit fee on appointment, and an annual rent thereafter. The restriction of these seigneural rights to that of 'advowson', purely a right of presentation, developed with the process of Gregorian Reform; in consequence of which payments from spiritual income to lay lords were forbidden. The new process was performed in conjunction with the bishop of the diocese in which the manor was situated.

The lord of the manor, having incurred a very great expense in building the church and parsonage and having suffered a loss of income due to his donation of property to the glebe, quite reasonably insisted on the right to select the individual who would act as parish priest, from which office he could not be ejected by the lord until the priest's death. The bishop, without whose consecration the new church would have no religious and spiritual stature, in turn demanded the right of confirmation of the appointment. Thus from the earliest time the advowson was "appurtenant to" the manor, that is to say it appertained to the manor and was exercisable by the lord.

The advowson, being real property could be "alienated" (i.e. disposed of) by sale or gift of the patron, but with special licence from the overlord as was required for the alienation of the manor itself.

== Presentation by turns ==
Where a manor was split into moieties due to inheritance by co-heiresses, the advowson was also split. Before the 13th century, this would commonly result in the rectory (and its advowson) being split into two or more portions, with the successors of each co-heiress from then on separately nominating a parish priest as their 'portioner'. Emerging canon law, however, strongly deprecated dividing the cure of souls for a single parish in this way, and bishops ceased to allow such devices; except in the case of portionary collegiate foundations. Henceforth therefore, if a lord of a manor died without male issue but with two daughters, the manorial lands would be split into two moieties still, however, within the original undivided parish, controlled by the husbands of each daughter, and the advowson would be held by each daughter's husband jure uxoris in turn. The husband of the elder daughter would have the right to the first presentation, that is to say, the right to appoint a new priest to the first vacancy, whilst the husband of the second daughter—or more usually, given the life tenure of priests, their descendant—would hold the right to the second presentation.

Where manors were split into three or more moieties or "purparties", the turns of presentation expanded accordingly. Bishops then sought to convert existing portionary churches into presentation by turns; but portionary arrangements nevertheless survived in several parishes into the 19th century; and a few still operate (though in name only, the portions being united into a single incumbent). Patrons in need of ready cash might seek to capitalize on the value of their advowsons by selling turns of presentation; either the next turn singly, or alternate future turns as a long-term asset.

== Encroachment of canon law ==
Canon law, however, by the 12th century, decreed that the right to present belonged to the saint to whom the church was dedicated and that only ecclesiastical courts could rule on cases involving advowsons. King Henry II's Constitutions of Clarendon held otherwise, and after Thomas Becket's murder, the king once more ruled that cases involving advowsons should be heard by secular courts.

== Effect of the Reformation ==
In the Reformation in the 16th century, the Dissolution of the Monasteries led to the transfer of much monastic property to laymen, and with the properties passed the advowsons which the monasteries had held: thus creating a large group of lay patrons (see impropriation). In 1603, there were an estimated 3,849 livings in the hands of lay impropriators out of a total of 9,284.

There were also many lords of manors and patrons of appurtenant livings who were recusants, that is to say who remained Roman Catholics and refused to adopt the new Protestant religion. Such patrons were disbarred from making presentations by the Presentation of Benefices Act 1605 (3 Jas. 1. c. 5), which transferred the right for the time being to the universities of Oxford or Cambridge according to the geographical location of the parish. The university was allowed to assign this right to a third party adherent to the new religion, for consideration or otherwise.

== Legal status ==
Legally, advowsons were treated as real property that could be held or conveyed, and conversely could be taken or encumbered, in the same general manner as a parcel of land. Advowsons were among the earliest incorporeal hereditaments, and often held in fee tail. Litigation (enabled in the temporal courts after the Reformation), on the basis of an advowson was somewhat specialized, with unique forms of action inapplicable to other realty, such as the writ of quare impedit, by which a patron sued a bishop in support of his presented candidate, alleging unreasonable hindrance to succession to a benefice.

Following reforms of parish administration in the late 19th century (principally the imposition of secular parishes and wider county and district authorities), the advowson had negligible commercial value. The Benefices Act 1898 (Amendment) Measure 1923 phased out advowsons so that they could not be sold or inherited after two vacancies occurred after 14 July 1924 and enabled their elimination earlier by direction of the current patron. It had the effect, however, in the words of the then Archbishop of Canterbury, Cosmo Lang, in 1933, "that the sale of advowsons very rapidly increased. Patrons were eager to sell, and were advised to sell, while their proprietary rights had still some financial value, and there can be no doubt the opportunity was used very largely to secure advowsons for party purposes and for party trusts.". The purchase of advowsons to ensure that a parish became an Anglo-Catholic, or more often Evangelical, stronghold, had begun in the 19th century. It led to a number of situations where an incumbent was imposed on a parish, and had been partly dealt with by the establishment of Diocesan Boards of Patronage in 1932.

The rich body of common law regarding advowsons can sometimes become relevant in modern times when dealing with disputes over modern incorporeal hereditaments, such as farming allotments, that are not handled by statute or adequately settled by other common law. An example, outside the English jurisdiction, is the 1980 case of First Victoria National Bank v. United States.

== Value ==
Advowsons were valuable assets for a number of reasons, principally as a means for the patron to exert moral influence on the parishioners, who were his manorial tenants, through the teaching and sermons of the parish priest. The manor was a business enterprise, and it was important for its commercial success that all who lived there should live and work in harmony for a common purpose, and should obey the law of the land and of the manorial court. Such a law-abiding attitude could be fostered by a suitable parish priest, and clearly the appointment of a priest who preached against this would be a disaster for the interests of the lord of the manor. An appointment could also be used to provide an income for a valued servant in holy orders (such as a chaplain or secretary), or as a reward for past services rendered to the patron by the appointee.

A benefice generally included use of a house, i.e. a vicarage, parsonage or rectory, as well as the income from the glebe and tithes, which would provide for the living expenses of the incumbent, and the value of the advowson would thus vary according to how richly endowed the glebe had been out of the lord of the manor's manorial lands. For example: the advowson of the parish of Paulerspury in Northamptonshire (Peterborough diocese) was bought by New College, Oxford, in 1750 for the sum of £1,300.

Advowsons were frequently used by lords and landowners as a means of providing a career and income for a younger son who, due to the custom of primogeniture, would not inherit any of the paternal lands. If the father did not already own a suitable advowson, he might purchase one for this purpose.

== Value as historical records ==
The records of historic presentations to manors are held amongst the muniments or archives of their dioceses. Often such records exist unbroken for several centuries, and record the names of the patron and the appointee, with related information. These records are thus of great value to non-ecclesiastical historians of the manors concerned, and also to genealogists, for example by confirming the name of the lord of the manor at a certain date, confirming the dates of his life, and the name of his heir, spouse or widow. Most of the secular historical records relating to manors are contained within manorial rolls or in the archives of the ancient departments of state, for example the records of the Exchequer, royal courts etc. The existence of an entirely independent set of records within the diocesan archives, generally published in the calendars of the bishops of the see in question, is thus a valuable resource.

== Current position ==
In the 20th century, it became the policy of many English dioceses to acquire the advowsons to the parish churches within their area. This gave the bishop total control over the selection of parish priests, which might give him or her political as well as religious influence over a parish. The distribution of the church income away from a select few means the days of the fiercely independent, often right-wing "fox-hunting parson" like Jack Russell (d. 1883), are extinct. Abolition of manorial courts in the 19th century and the gradual removal of copyhold title, ending in 1925, meant the powers, not the vestigial office, of the lord of the manor, were eliminated.

Inheritants of any part of these lands could be expressed to hold the right of advowson appurtenant to their lands, in many cases impliedly, but not so in registered land. In most instances, lay holders are willing to donate them without payment to the diocese, on being asked to do so in a polite letter from the bishop. Advowsons have lower value to lay holders, since the ban on sale of livings is more easily enforced and few lay holders wish to exert a proxy influence over the morals of their neighbourhood, most of which would have from medieval times to the 19th century have been their tenants in the parish, nor in such a way for their younger children to be put forward for preferred selection as parish priests, which was in the era of tithes often a source of high real-terms pay. Lay advowsons have been left by successive wills or estate successions and so it is a sign of past wealth to hold many advowsons. Debrett's Peerage of 1995 shows John Hervey, 7th Marquess of Bristol (d. 1999), then aged 40, in a modern extreme example: he was "patron of thirty livings".

Many advowsons rest with the Church Society on the Protestant wing of the church, and on the Anglo-Catholic wing with The Church Union and the Society for the Maintenance of the Faith. Donation to one of these can help to seek to see that style of worship remains constant over generations in a parish with slightly less regard to reforms in either direction introduced by the local bishops, though in all cases the ultimate decisions to appoint and promote rest with the bishops. This is tempered by the central policies of many faiths, but particularly churches, of subsidiarity (local differentiation) which is opposed to dogma from senior figures.

In 2019, Teresa Sutton argued for three specific reforms in the Ecclesiastical Law Journal:

"First, propose a sunset rule on individual private lay patronage providing that personal patronage may no longer be passed onto another individual.

Second, develop a nominal figurehead 'charity patron' role without formal rights of presentation for educational or guild patrons that are willing to retain supportive links with a church.

Finally, recognise value in the work of the patronage societies in reflecting churchmanship through provision for societies to assist parishes, but only where PCCs opt into continuing that arrangement at the point of vacancy."

Anthony Jennings responded to Sutton's article describing her proposal to abolish private patronage as "drastic".

In March 2021, the PCC of St Luke's, West Holloway announced it is seeking a patron other than the Church Pastoral Aid Society. St Luke's is a member of Inclusive Church and flies an LGBT Pride flag, an outlook not shared by CPAS, according to Rev John MacKenzie, vicar of the church. The PCC believes that "the CPAS board of trustees did not want to give up this patronage without acquiring another in its place, but might be willing to swap". Writing about the system of patronage, Martin Wroe suggested it is "time to disempower some of these hidden hierarchies and place a little more trust in the local".

== See also ==
- Annates
- Royal peculiar
- Society for the Maintenance of the Faith

== Bibliography ==
- Chadwick, Owen. The Victorian Church, Part II 1860-1901 (1970) pp 207–17.
- Neep, EJC; Edinger, George (1928), A Handbook of Church Law for the Clergy, London: AR Mowbray, p. 8.
- Smith, Peter M. "The advowson: The history and development of a most peculiar property." Ecclesiastical Law Journal 5#26 (2000): 320–339.
- Sutton, Teresa (2019). "Advowsons and private patronage" (PDF). Ecclesiastical Law Journal. 21 (3): 267–288. doi:10.1017/S0956618X19000681. S2CID 203050109.
