= Joan Vickers, Baroness Vickers =

British politician

The Right Honourable The Baroness Vickers DBE
- Vickers in 1967 by Walter Bird

Member of Parliament for Plymouth Devonport
- In office 26 May 1955 – 8 February 1974
- Preceded by: Michael Foot
- Succeeded by: David Owen

Personal details
- Born: Joan Helen Vickers; 3 June 1907 London, England
- Died: 23 May 1994 (aged 86) Enford, Wiltshire, England
- Party: Conservative
- Other political affiliations: National Liberal (until 1968)

Joan Helen Vickers, Baroness Vickers, DBE (3 June 1907 – 23 May 1994) was a British National Liberal and later Conservative Party politician. She was the MP for Plymouth Devonport from 1955 to 1974.

== Early life ==
Vickers was born in London on 3 June 1907, the eldest daughter of (Horace) Cecil Vickers (1882–1944), a stockbroker, and his wife, Lilian Munro Lambert Grose (1880–1923), a social worker, only daughter of Woodman Cole Grose, MBE, a civil servant. Her father's family came originally from Lincolnshire and her mother's from Cornwall.

Her father joined Nelke, Phillips & Bendix, a London stockbroking firm who counted Edward VII as one of their clients. He was elected to the Stock Exchange on 25 March 1904 and became one of their partners at their office at 4 Moorgate Street. In 1917, he set up his own firm, Vickers, da Costa, which counted Sir Winston Churchill among their clients. Her brother, Ralph Vickers was later Senior Partner of the firm.

Vickers was educated at St Monica's, Burgh Heath, Surrey, and in Paris. She was trained as a Norland Nurse, working in the Margaret Macdonald and Mary Middleton Hospital, Notting Hill, and was active in politics in Battersea and Islington. She was presented at court by Mrs Winston Churchill in 1926.

Vickers hunted in Leicestershire, rode horses for the Irish Free State Army to ladies classes and competed in the Dublin Horse Show as a jumper. She served with the Red Cross in South East Asia and was area welfare officer of the Social Welfare Department in Malaya. She was later chairman of the Anglo-Indonesian Society.

== Career ==
=== Early political career ===
Seeking a career in politics, she went to see Winston Churchill at Chartwell. He told her he deeply disapproved of women in politics, particularly in parliament, but advised her to wear a pretty hat and join the London County Council. In 1936, she was elected a Member of the Ladies' Grand Council of the Primrose League.

In 1937, she was elected to the London County Council, representing the Norwood division of Lambeth, and serving until 1945. In 1939, she was nominated by the British Red Cross to serve as Divisional Secretary, Lambeth Division, and in 1940, similarly for Southwark. However, during the war, she was often abroad, repatriating prisoners of war.

=== Overseas ===
Vickers worked for 14 months with the Red Cross in Indonesia, four years in British Malaya (now Malaysia) as a Social Welfare Area Officer in Negri Sembilan, Malacca and Johore. She was nominated a member of the Legislative Council in Negri Sembilan. She was a founder member of the Royal Commonwealth Society for the Blind, and started the work in Malaysia, Uganda, Tanzania, Malawi, Zambia and Kenya.

More specifically, in August 1945, she signed up to serve as Chief Welfare Officer, S.E.A.C. with the British Red Cross Society and the Order of St John. In September 1945, she arrived with six other women in Batavia, primarily to help British troops but working not only in British hospitals but also in Dutch, Indonesian and Chinese hospitals. She left in November 1946, having given great help to troops and medical units. The Dutch Red Cross were most appreciative, and she was awarded the Netherlands Red Cross Order of Merit (1946). She was appointed MBE (1946). From there she went to Malaya where she served as Area Welfare Officer, Department of Social Service from January 1947 to May 1948. She visited Singapore, New Zealand and Australia in the summer of 1948.

=== Parliament ===
Vickers, the only known female National Liberal politician nationally, unsuccessfully contested South Poplar at the 1945 general election. At the 1955 general election she was elected as the Member of Parliament (MP) for Plymouth Devonport. Though the seat was thought to be safe for the Labour Party, she defeated incumbent Michael Foot by 100 votes, after canvassing every residence in the constituency. She defeated him again in 1959 by the greatly increased majority of 6,454. Her seat was always marginal, but she held it in the 1964, 1966 and 1970 elections.

She was considered a dedicated constituency MP, taking a house in Devonport, travelling to and from the constituency every weekend and holding regular surgeries. She never became a Minister, possibly because she always voted on conscience rather than following the whip. She was appointed DBE in 1964. During her years as an MP, she not only addressed numerous women's issues, but also spoke on defence issues and was a zealous supporter of the Commonwealth, always keen to entertain visiting parliamentarians, parliamentary clerks from abroad, and overseas students.

She was a UK delegate to the Council of Europe in Strasbourg, and the Western European Union from 1967 to 1974. Every year she was elected by all parties as a member of the Commonwealth Parliamentary Association and the Inter-Parliamentary Union. She sat on the UK COSA Committee. She was a working member of the International Friendship League. In her life as an MP, she visited all the major Commonwealth countries for conferences, and most of the Caribbean countries, including Guyana and Belize, as well as Fiji, Tonga and Ceylon. She was on the committee of the London Centre, to which members came from India and Jamaica.

She sat until the February 1974 general election when she was defeated by Labour's David Owen.

== Peerage and later life ==
Vickers was created a life peer, as Baroness Vickers, of Devonport in the County of Devon on 27 January 1975. She was instrumental in the passage of the British Nationality (Falkland Islands) Act 1983 in the House of Lords.

She also became president of the Women's Corona Society (now Corona Worldwide) in the late 1970s, an organisation that provided information to women who travelled and lived overseas.

In her later years, Vickers lived at a cottage in East Chisenbury, in Enford, Wiltshire. She died there from bronchopneumonia on 23 May 1994, at the age of 86.

== Arms ==
Coat of arms of Joan Vickers, Baroness Vickers
Crest A Millrind Sable between two Dolphins respectant heads downwards proper Escutcheon Azure on a Pale Argent a Boat in frame proper in base two Horses courant in fess Argent Supporters Dexter: a Welder habited in Overalls Vert wearing a Headpiece with central panel of Dark Glass, gloved and in the dexter hand an Electrode holder all proper; Sinister: a Female Red Cross Worker in uniform also proper Motto Victory through Endeavour Orders Dame Commander of the Most Excellent Order of the British Empire

== Legacy ==
The fish species Rasbora johannae Siebert & Guiry, 1996 is named after her. Native to Indonesia, it was named as a tribute to her work in the country.

Parliament of the United Kingdom
Preceded by Michael Foot	Member of Parliament for Plymouth Devonport; 1955 – 1974	Succeeded by Dr David Owen
