= David Owen =

British politician (born 1938)

The Right Honourable The Lord Owen CH PC FRCP
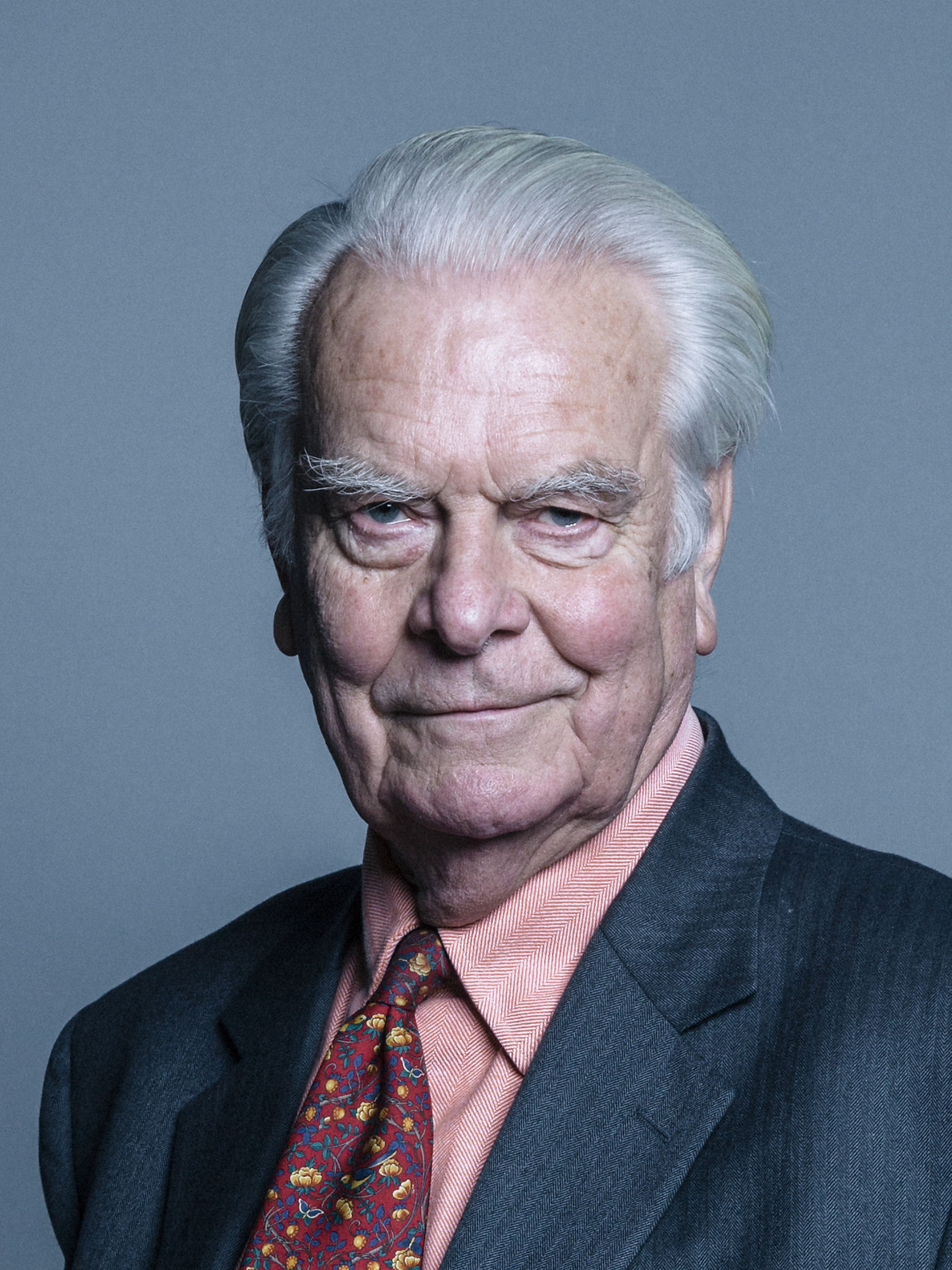
- Official portrait, 2018

Foreign Secretary
- In office 21 February 1977 – 4 May 1979
- Prime Minister: James Callaghan
- Preceded by: Anthony Crosland
- Succeeded by: The Lord Carrington
Party political offices
Leader of the "Continuing" Social Democratic Party
In office 3 March 1988 – 6 June 1990
| Preceded by | Party established |
| Succeeded by | Party dissolved |
Leader of the Social Democratic Party
In office 21 June 1983 – 6 August 1987
| President | Shirley Williams |
| Preceded by | Roy Jenkins |
| Succeeded by | Bob Maclennan |
Deputy Leader of the Social Democratic Party
In office October 1982 – 21 June 1983
| Leader | Roy Jenkins |
| Preceded by | Position established |
| Succeeded by | Position abolished |
Junior ministerial offices
Minister of State for Foreign and Commonwealth Affairs
In office 10 September 1976 – 21 February 1977
| Prime Minister | James Callaghan |
| Sec. of State | Anthony Crosland |
| Preceded by | Roy Hattersley |
| Succeeded by | Frank Judd |
Minister of State for Health and Social Security
In office 26 July 1974 – 10 September 1976
| Prime Minister | Harold Wilson |
| Sec. of State | Barbara Castle; David Ennals |
| Preceded by | Brian O'Malley |
| Succeeded by | Roland Moyle |
Parliamentary Under-Secretary of State for Health and Social Security
In office 8 March 1974 – 26 July 1974
| Prime Minister | Harold Wilson |
| Sec. of State | Barbara Castle |
| Preceded by | Michael Alison |
| Succeeded by | Robert Brown |
Parliamentary Under-Secretary of State for the Royal Navy
In office 3 July 1968 – 18 June 1970
| Prime Minister | Harold Wilson |
| Sec. of State | Denis Healey |
| Preceded by | Maurice Foley |
| Succeeded by | Peter Kirk |
Shadow Cabinet offices
Shadow Secretary of State for Energy
In office 14 July 1979 – 4 November 1980
| Leader | James Callaghan |
| Shadowing | David Howell |
| Preceded by | Tom King |
| Succeeded by | Merlyn Rees |
Shadow Secretary of State for Foreign and Commonwealth Affairs
In office 4 May 1979 – 14 July 1979
| Leader | James Callaghan |
| Shadowing | The Lord Carrington |
| Preceded by | Francis Pym |
| Succeeded by | Peter Shore |
Parliamentary offices
Member of the House of Lords
Lord Temporal
Life peerage 30 June 1992 – 13 August 2024
Member of Parliament for Plymouth Devonport
In office 28 February 1974 – 16 March 1992
| Preceded by | Joan Vickers |
| Succeeded by | David Jamieson |
Member of Parliament for Plymouth Sutton
In office 31 March 1966 – 8 February 1974
| Preceded by | Ian Fraser |
| Succeeded by | Alan Clark |

Personal details
- Born: David Anthony Llewellyn Owen; 2 July 1938 (age 88) Plympton, Devon, England
- Party: Independent (1990–present)
- Other political affiliations: Labour (1960–1981); Social Democratic Party (1981–1988); "Continuing" Social Democratic Party (1988–1990)
- Spouse: Deborah Schabert (m. 1968)
- Children: 3
- Education: Sidney Sussex College, Cambridge; King's College London

David Anthony Llewellyn Owen, Baron Owen, CH, PC, FRCP (born 2 July 1938) is a British politician and physician. He served as Foreign Secretary in the Labour government of James Callaghan from 1977 to 1979, becoming the youngest person appointed to the position since 1935, and later led the Social Democratic Party (SDP). He was a Member of Parliament for 26 years, from 1966 to 1992.

In 1981, Owen was one of the "Gang of Four" who left the Labour Party to found the Social Democratic Party. He was the only member of the Gang of Four who did not join the Liberal Democrats, which was founded when the SDP merged with the Liberal Party. Owen led the Social Democratic Party from 1983 to 1987, and the continuing SDP from 1988 to 1990. Appointed as a life peer in 1992, he sat in the House of Lords as a crossbencher until March 2014, and sat as an "independent social democrat" until his retirement in 2024.

In the course of his career, Owen has held, and resigned from, a number of senior posts. He first quit as Labour's spokesman on defence in 1972 in protest at the Labour leader and former prime minister Harold Wilson's attitude to the European Communities; he left the Labour Shadow cabinet over the same issue later; and over unilateral disarmament in November 1980 when Michael Foot became Labour leader. He resigned from the Labour Party when it rejected one member one vote in February 1981, and later as Leader of the Social Democratic Party, which he had helped to found, after the party's rank-and-file membership voted to merge with the Liberal Party.

== Early life ==
Owen was born in 1938 to Welsh parents in Plympton, near the city of Plymouth, in Devon, England. He also has Swiss and Irish ancestry. He described Plymouth as "a Cromwellian city, surrounded by royalists". After schooling at Mount House School, Tavistock, and Bradfield College, Berkshire, he was admitted to Sidney Sussex College, Cambridge, in 1956 to study Medicine, and obtained a lower second; he was made an honorary fellow of the college in 1977. He began clinical training at St Thomas's Hospital in October 1959.

Owen was deeply affected by the Suez Crisis of 1956, when Anthony Eden's Conservative government launched a military operation to retrieve the Suez Canal after President Nasser's decision to nationalise it. At the time, aged 18, he was working in a labouring job before going to Cambridge. Owen later told Kenneth Harris:

[T]here was Gaitskell ... criticizing Eden, and here were these men working alongside me, who should have been his natural supporters, furious with him. The Daily Mirror backed Gaitskell, but these men were tearing up their Daily Mirrors every day. ... My working mates were solidly in favour of Eden. It was not only that they taught me how people like them think; they also opened my eyes to how I should think myself. From then on I never identified with the liberal – with a small 'l' – establishment. Through that experience I became suspicious of a kind of automatic sogginess which you come across in many aspects of British life. ... The rather defeatist, even traitorous attitude reflected in the pre-war Apostles at Cambridge. I suppose it underlay the appeasement years. Its modern equivalent is a resigned attitude to Britain's continuous post-war economic decline.

== Medicine and politics ==
In 1960, Owen joined the Vauxhall branch of the Labour Party and the Fabian Society. He qualified as a doctor in 1962 and began work at St Thomas's Hospital. In 1964, he contested the Torrington seat as the Labour candidate against the Conservative incumbent, losing in what was a traditional Conservative–Liberal marginal. He was neurology and psychiatric registrar at St Thomas's Hospital for two years, as assistant to William Sargant, then Research Fellow on the Medical Unit doing research into Parkinsonian trauma and neuropharmacology.

== Member of Parliament ==
At the next general election in 1966, Owen returned to his home town and was elected Labour Member of Parliament (MP) for the Plymouth Sutton constituency. Aged 27, he was one of the youngest MPs in Parliament. In the February 1974 general election Owen became Labour MP for the adjacent Plymouth Devonport constituency, winning it from the Conservative incumbent Dame Joan Vickers by a slim margin (437 votes). He managed to hold on to it in the 1979 general election, again by a narrow margin (1001 votes). From 1981, however, his involvement with the SDP meant he developed a large personal following in the constituency and thereafter he was re-elected as an SDP candidate with safe margins. He remained as MP for Plymouth Devonport until his elevation to a peerage in 1992.

From 1968 to 1970, Owen served as Parliamentary Under Secretary of State for the Royal Navy in Harold Wilson's first government. After Labour's defeat in the 1970 general election, he became the party's Junior Defence Spokesman until 1972 when he resigned with Roy Jenkins over Labour's opposition to the European Community. On Labour's return to government in March 1974, he became Parliamentary Under-Secretary for Health before being promoted to Minister of State for Health in July 1974.

== In Government ==
As Minister of State for Health, Owen encouraged Britain to become "self-sufficient" in blood products such as Factor VIII, a recommendation also promoted by the World Health Organisation. This was principally due to the risk of hepatitis infection from high-risk blood donors overseas who were often paid and from "skid-row" locations. David Owen has been outspoken that his policy of "Self-Sufficiency" was not put into place (although he was, himself, Minister of Health) and gave rise to the Tainted Blood Scandal which saw 5,000 British Haemophiliacs infected with Hepatitis C, 1,200 of those were also infected with HIV. It was later described in the House of Lords as "the worst treatment disaster in the history of the National Health Service".

In September 1976, Owen was appointed by the new prime minister of five months, James Callaghan, as a Minister of State at the Foreign Office, and was consequently admitted to the Privy Council. Five months later, however, the Foreign Secretary, Anthony Crosland, died suddenly and Owen was appointed his successor. Aged 38, he became the youngest Foreign Secretary since Anthony Eden in 1935.

In 1977, Owen was condemned by Black civil rights leader Billy Strachan for refusing to prevent the hanging of two Black Bermudians for murder in the British colony. As Foreign Secretary, Owen was identified with the Anglo-American plan for Rhodesia, which formed the basis for the Lancaster House Agreement, negotiated by his Tory successor, Lord Carrington, in December 1979. The Contact Group sponsored UN Resolution 435 in 1978 on which Namibia moved to independence twelve years later. He wrote a book entitled Human Rights and championed that cause in Africa and in the Soviet Union. He later admitted to at one stage contemplating the assassination of Idi Amin while Foreign Secretary but settled instead on backing President Nyerere of Tanzania with money for arms purchases for his attack on Uganda which led to the exile of Amin to Saudi Arabia.

Shortly after Labour's defeat in the 1979 general election and following the election of a new Shadow Cabinet Callaghan moved Owen from the position of Shadow Foreign Secretary to Shadow Energy Secretary, a move which was reported as being a demotion.

Eighteen months after Labour lost power, the staunchly left-wing politician Michael Foot was elected party leader, despite vocal opposition from Labour Party moderates (including Owen), sparking a crisis over the party's future.

== Social Democratic Party and Liberal–SDP Alliance ==
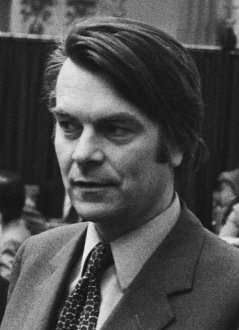
Owen in 1980

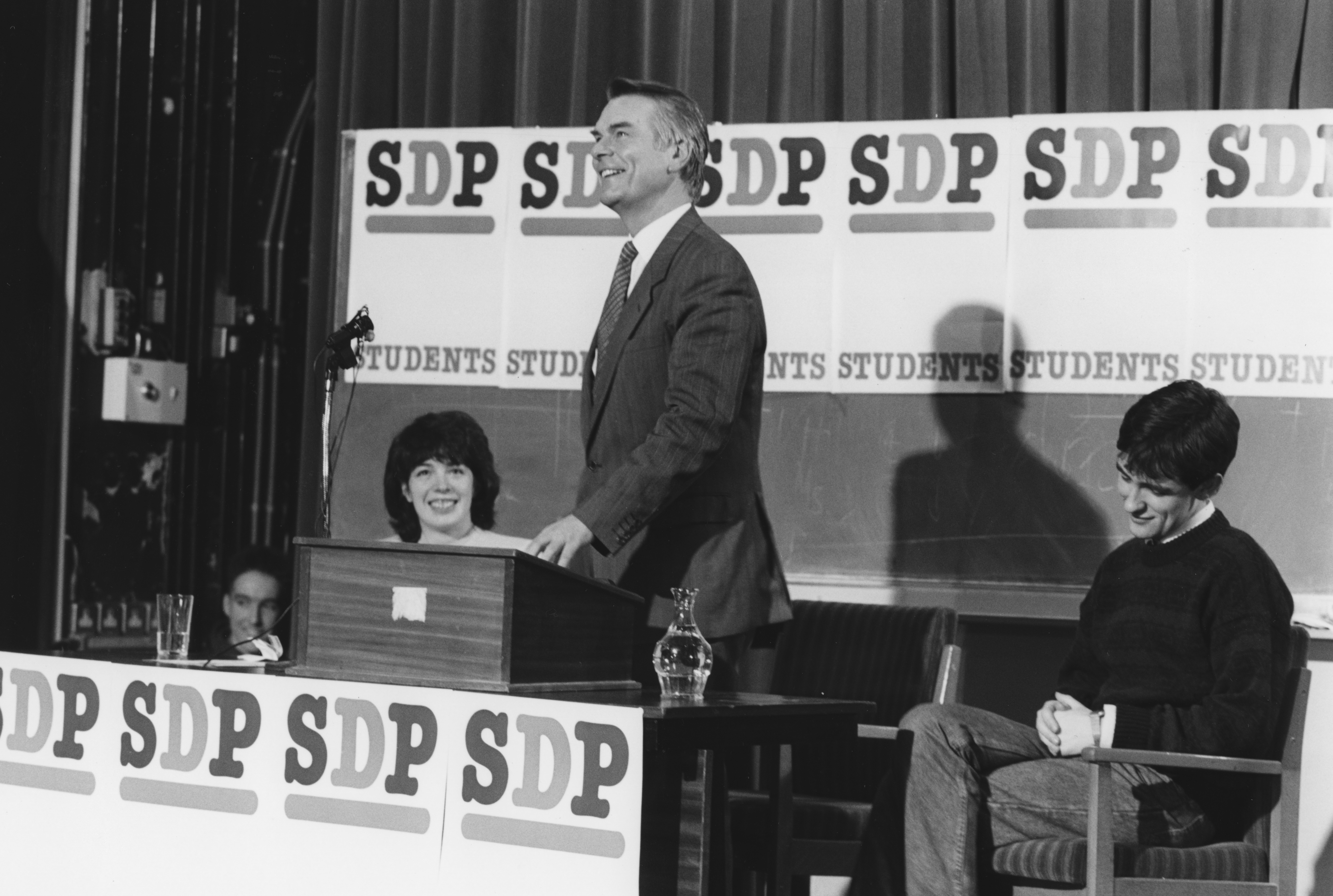
Owen speaking in 1981

Michael Foot's election as Labour party leader indicated that the party was likely to become more left-wing, and in 1980 committed itself to withdrawing from the EEC without even a referendum (as Labour had carried out in 1975). Labour also endorsed unilateral nuclear disarmament and introduced an electoral college for leadership elections, with 40% of the college going to a block vote of the trade unions.

Early in 1981, Owen and three other senior moderate Labour politicians – Roy Jenkins, Bill Rodgers and Shirley Williams – announced their intention to break away from the Labour Party to form a "Council for Social Democracy". The announcement became known as the Limehouse Declaration and the four as the "Gang of Four". The council they formed became the Social Democratic Party (SDP), with a collective leadership. Although Owen was one of the founding members of the party, he was not always enthusiastic about creating a schism on the centre-left, saying to the Glasgow Herald in January 1981 that he felt "haunted by the possibility that, if the Labour Party splits, the centre left will never again form the Government in Britain".

Twenty-eight other Labour MPs and one Conservative MP (Christopher Brocklebank-Fowler) joined the new party. In late 1981, the SDP formed the SDP–Liberal Alliance with the Liberal Party to strengthen both parties' chances in the UK's "first past the post" electoral system. The alliance performed so well that for much of the early part of 1982, it appeared that it would become a centre-left coalition government at the next election. In 1982, uneasy about the Alliance, Owen challenged Jenkins for the leadership of the SDP, but was defeated by 26,256 votes to 20,864. In the following year's general election, the Alliance gained 25% of the vote, only slightly behind the Labour Party, but because of the first-past-the-post voting system, it won only 23 out of 650 seats. Although elected, Jenkins resigned the SDP leadership and Owen succeeded to it without a contest among the six remaining SDP MPs.

In 1982, during the Falklands War, Owen spoke at the Bilderberg meeting advocating sanctions against Argentina. Ironically, the success of the war ended any hope that SDP might have had of winning the 1983 election. The Tories were proving unpopular largely due to high unemployment and the early 1980s recession. However, Britain's success in the conflict saw Margaret Thatcher and her Tory government surge back to the top of the opinion polls, and her position was strengthened further by the end of the year as the recession died down.

=== SDP leadership ===
Owen is widely regarded as having been, at the very least, a competent party leader. He had high popularity ratings throughout his leadership as did the SDP–Liberal Alliance. Owen kept a high profile, so much so that Spitting Image, the satirical puppet show, depicted the Liberal leader David Steel popping up like a jack-in-the-box in Owen's pocket. He succeeded in keeping the party in the public eye and in maintaining its independence from the Liberals for the length of the 1983 Parliament. Moreover, under him, the SDP increased its representation from six to eight seats via the by-election victories of Mike Hancock, at Portsmouth South (1984), and Rosie Barnes, at Greenwich (1987).

However, the progress of the SDP–Liberal Alliance as a whole was hampered, with policy splits between the two parties. The first was over the miners' strike of 1984–85, with Owen and most of the SDP favouring a fairly tough line but the Liberals preferring compromise and negotiation. After the killing of David Wilkie for driving a miner to work, Owen called for all miners to return to work on the following Monday to show their "gut reaction" to the killing. More significantly the Alliance had a dispute over the future of Britain's independent nuclear deterrent. Owen and the SDP favoured replacing Polaris with Trident as a matter of some importance, whereas most Liberals were either indifferent to the issue or committed disarmers. The SDP favoured a radical social market economy, while the Liberals mostly favoured a more interventionist, corporate style approach. The cumulative effect of these divisions was to make the Alliance appear less credible as a potential government in the eyes of the electorate.

Moreover, Owen, unlike Jenkins, faced an increasingly moderate Labour Party under Neil Kinnock and a dynamic Conservative government. The 1987 general election was as disappointing for the Alliance as the 1983 election and it lost one seat. Nevertheless, it won over 23% of the vote – at that time, the second-largest third-placed vote in British politics since 1929.

=== Full parties' merger ===
In 1987 immediately after the election, the Liberal leader David Steel proposed a full merger of the Liberal and SDP parties and was supported for the SDP by Roy Jenkins, Shirley Williams and Bill Rodgers. Owen rejected this notion outright, on the grounds that he and other Social Democrats wished to remain faithful to social democracy as it was practised within Western Europe, and it was unlikely that any merged party would be able to do this, even if it was under his leadership. Nevertheless, the majority of the SDP membership supported the merger.

The Liberal Party and SDP merged to form the Social and Liberal Democrats (SLD) in March 1988, renamed the Liberal Democrats in October 1989.

At the request of two of the remaining SDP MPs, John Cartwright and Rosie Barnes, Owen continued to lead a much smaller continuing SDP, with three MPs in total. The party polled well at its first election, its candidate coming a close second in the 1989 Richmond by-election, but thereafter a string of poor and ultimately disastrous by-election results followed, including coming behind the Official Monster Raving Loony Party in the Bootle by-election of May 1990, prompting Owen to wind up the party in 1990. Owen blamed the SDP's demise on the reforms which had been taking place in the Labour Party since Kinnock's election as leader in 1983.

Some branches, however, continued to function using the SDP name; Bridlington's was still extant in 2006.

Lord Holme later blamed Owen for the Alliance's failure to make a breakthrough at the 1987 general election, believing that a merged party would have performed much better and possibly gained more votes and seats than Labour.

== Post-SDP: Political allegiances as a life peer ==
After winding up the re-formed SDP, Owen announced his intention to stand down as an MP at the next general election. He then served the remainder of his term as an independent MP and after the 1992 general election was made a life peer, nominated by then Conservative Prime Minister, John Major, with the title, Baron Owen, of the City of Plymouth in the County of Devon. in Letters Patent dated 30 June 1992. As a member of the House of Lords, he is called "Lord Owen" and he sat as a crossbencher until 2014 (see below). Owen was awarded an Honorary Doctorate of Letters from Plymouth University in 1992.

During the April 1992 election campaign, Owen writing in The Mail on Sunday newspaper advised voters to vote Liberal Democrat where they had a chance of victory and to vote Conservative rather than let Neil Kinnock become prime minister. Owen maintained his long-standing position that he would never join the Conservative Party, although the memoirs of at least three of John Major's cabinet ministers refer to Major being quite keen to appoint Owen to his cabinet, but threats of resignation from within the Cabinet prevented him from doing so. When asked in a conversation with Woodrow Wyatt on 18 December 1988 whether she would have Owen in her government if approached by him, Margaret Thatcher replied: "Well, not straight away. I don't think I would do it straight away. He was very good on the Northern Ireland terrorist business. He's wasting his life now. It's so tragic. He's got real ability and it ought to be used". In another conversation with Wyatt on 4 June 1990 Thatcher said Owen's natural home was the Conservative Party.

Owen was approached privately by Tony Blair, then leader of the Opposition, in 1996 on whether he was ready to support New Labour. Lord Owen declined mainly because he disagreed with Blair's intention, as prime minister, to join the eurozone. In 2019, Owen recounted that Blair implied that a “political future” awaited him if he rejoined Labour. Owen said he "was very tempted, but then [Blair] started to talk about the euro.” Owen concluded that Blair was “passionately committed” to taking Britain into the Euro; thus, Owen said no.

In May 2005, he was approached two days before the general election by someone very close to Tony Blair to endorse Labour. He declined, because though he did not want a Conservative government, he wanted the Liberal Democrats to do sufficiently well to ensure a greatly reduced Labour majority. In September 2007, it was reported in the British press that Lord Owen had met the new prime minister Gordon Brown and afterwards had refused to rule out supporting Labour at the next general election. It later emerged that he could have been part of the "government of all the talents" initiative advising on the NHS, but Owen declined. In October 2009 he wrote an article in The Times predicting that the Conservatives, then well ahead in the opinion polls, were unlikely to win an outright majority. He helped create the web-based Charter 2010 to explain and promote the potential of a hung parliament. The website campaign was launched in January 2010 while the Conservatives still appeared on course to win outright. Within weeks the polls changed and the website became a major source of information about hung parliaments. In May 2010 The Sunday Times called Owen "the prophet of the coalition".

During the 2011 Alternative Vote referendum he signed a letter in The Guardian stating that he opposed AV but would continue to campaign for proportional representation.

In January 2011, Owen said that his "heart was with Labour" and that he looked forward to the time when he could vote Labour again. He added that what hampered him in the past was the way the Labour Party elects its leader and it was very necessary for the electoral college arrangement to be reformed and he refused to rule out joining the Labour Party in the future. He vigorously opposed the Health and Social Care Bill in 2011–12. In a pamphlet, "Fatally Flawed", he demonstrated that far from the internal market, which he had championed in the 1980s, the Bill introduced an external market and he worked closely with the Labour Front Bench in the House of Lords. In March 2014, it was revealed that Owen had donated over £7,500 to the Labour Party, following the Labour leader Ed Miliband's reforms of the party's links with trade unions. No longer eligible to sit as a crossbencher, Owen sat in the House of Lords as an "Independent Social Democrat" from then until his retirement in 2024. Owen later said he admired Miliband's "integrity" and "guts".

In the June 2017 general election, Owen made no political donation nationally although he was "pleasantly surprised that the manifesto was a lot better than expected", and praised Corbyn for showing "more flexibility in taking account of Labour MPs and party members’ views than ever Michael Foot did" in reference to the manifesto's commitments to NATO and nuclear weapons despite Corbyn's lifelong pacifism. He did, however, make a personal donation to the Labour candidate in his former constituency of Plymouth Sutton & Devonport, Luke Pollard, who successfully won the seat.

However in March 2019, Owen said he would not support Labour, criticising Corbyn's leadership for its failure to "unequivocally" root out antisemitism in the Labour Party. In October 2019, Owen warned that Labour would lose potentially 5 million Leave voters who supported them due to its stance for a second Brexit referendum, and said that Labour under Corbyn and John McDonnell reminded voters of "the Labour Party of the 1980s". He also criticised McDonnell's push to change Labour's policy to a second referendum stance. In the subsequent December 2019 general election, true to Owen's warning, Labour lost 60 seats, including long time Labour seats in the red wall which supported leaving the EU.

Owen retired from the House of Lords on 13 August 2024.

== Subsequent international role ==
In August 1992, Owen was British Prime Minister John Major's choice to succeed Lord Carrington as the EU co-chairman of the Conference for the Former Yugoslavia, along with Cyrus Vance, the former US Secretary of State as the UN co-chairman.

Private Eye, the British satirical magazine, playfully alluded towards Owen's legendary tendency towards self-destruction. "It's a lost cause", says the bubble emanating from Major's mouth. "I'm your man", says the bubble from Owen's mouth. The Labour Shadow Foreign Minister, Jack Cunningham, greeted Major's appointment of Owen in the British House of Commons by saying that the Prime Minister's choice "was regarded as somewhat eccentric by [MPs] and myself – he [Owen] is known for many qualities, but not as a mediator. Indeed he has Balkanised a few political parties himself."

Some believe David Owen comes across badly in Adam Le Bor's book, Milosevic: A Biography: "After he was appointed the European Community negotiator for the former Yugoslavia in 1992, Lord Owen and his wife Debbie cultivated a personal friendship with Milosevic and his wife Mira, flying in a helicopter to lunch with them in one of Tito's former palaces and offering publishing advice to Mira Milosevic". In August 1992, five months after the Bosnian war started, Owen said, "Now it is clear that Milosevic really wants peace".

Owen became a joint author of the Vance–Owen Peace Plan (VOPP), in January 1993, which made an effort to move away from the presumption of ethnic partition. According to America's last ambassador to Yugoslavia, the Bosnian Government were ready to accept the VOPP, but unfortunately the Clinton Administration delayed in its support, thus missing a chance to get it launched. The VOPP was eventually agreed in Athens in May 1993 under intense pressure by all parties including Bosnian Serb leader Radovan Karadžić but then rejected later by the Bosnian-Serb Assembly meeting in Pale, after Karadžić insisted that the Assembly had the right to ratify the agreement. After Vance's withdrawal, Owen and Thorvald Stoltenberg brokered the EU Action Plan of December 1993. They both helped the Contact Group of the US/UK/France/Germany and Russia to present its plan in the summer of 1994.

In early 1994, the European Parliament voted by 160 votes to 90, with 2 abstentions, for Owen's dismissal, but he was supported by all 15 EU Member State governments. There was a perception in America that Owen was "not fulfilling his function as an impartial negotiator". Owen, however, was consistently supported by all 15 EU Member States and the German Presidency in July 1994 urged him to remain as did the French Presidency in January 1995. Owen was made a Member of the Order of the Companions of Honour for his services in the former Yugoslavia in 1994.

In January 1995, Owen wrote to François Mitterrand as President of the European Union to say that he wished to step down before the end of the French presidency. At the end of May 1995, he was succeeded by the former Swedish Prime Minister Carl Bildt. "Had I been younger, I would probably have resigned when the Americans ditched the Vance-Owen Peace Plan".

Owen testified as a witness of the court in the trial of Slobodan Milošević, the former president of FR Yugoslavia.

== Later political commentary ==
Lord Owen has continued to speak out on issues of international affairs including on nuclear proliferation and constrained intervention. In 2011 he was the first politician to call for a "no-fly zone" over Libya. In an editorial on 27 February 2011 the Sunday Times said, "It was a man who has not been in office for nearly 32 years – Lord Owen, the former foreign secretary – who has been the most eloquent British voice over Libya. His call for a no-fly-zone ... struck the right note".

=== Contaminated blood scandal ===
As former Minister of State for Health, Lord Owen has long been highly critical of previous governments for their role in and handling of the tainted blood scandal. Alleging maladministration in 2002 he sought to bring about an inquiry into the matter and was joined in his efforts by former Solicitor General for England and Wales Lord Archer, former Shadow Secretary of State for Health and Social Services Lord Jenkin and others.

In 2009 the culmination of these efforts, the privately funded and independent "Archer Report" in which Lord Owen was heavily involved, published its findings but was thwarted because it had no power to compel witnesses as it was not a statutory public inquiry. Successive governments have refused to hold a public inquiry into the matter and continue to withhold documentation on grounds of commercial interest.

During his investigation into the matter he attempted to access his archived documents and files from his time as minister. At first he was told "they couldn't find them" and was later told they had all been destroyed; the exact series of events that led to the destruction of these documents remains a mystery and continues to raise questions amongst MPs such as Alistair Burt. Lord Owen has regularly told the media that he is not a conspiracy theorist but that he does suspect there has been a cover-up carried out by the Civil Service and that this was done after prosecutions and jail sentences were brought against government officials in France.

In September 2016 at a film-screening of the documentary Bad Blood: A Cautionary Tale, he dramatically ended a 15-minute speech on the subject proclaiming: "I have failed and I feel very miserable about it".

In October 2016, the Civil Service Commission refused a request to investigate Lord Owen's destroyed documents and separately the Department of Health advised that "the Department does not have any plans to make public the identity of junior officials involved in this matter".

On 10 May 2017 he featured in an episode of BBC Panorama called "Contaminated Blood: The Search for the Truth". On 22 September 2020, Lord Owen gave evidence to the Infected Blood Inquiry in London. As part of his testimony he said: "We should have realised how dangerous it was to rely on blood coming in from abroad from people who were giving their blood for money". The final report of the Inquiry was published on 20 May 2024, concluding that the scandal could have been largely avoided, patients were knowingly exposed to "unacceptable risks", and that doctors, the NHS and the government tried to cover up what happened by "hiding the truth".

=== European Union and subsequent support for Brexit ===
Owen had previously been a supporter of Britain's membership of the European Union (saying that he was "not a Eurosceptic" and a "convinced European"), but in recent years has opposed what he sees as the increased federalisation of the EU, citing examples such as a unified currency (the euro), a unified defence force and a unified foreign policy as "structure[s] for a United States of Europe".

As chairman of New Europe, he was the co-leader of the 'No to the Euro' campaign with Business for Sterling, which ceased when the UK Government declared in 2005 that Euro membership was off the agenda following the defeat of the EU Constitution in referendums in France and the Netherlands.

He called for a referendum before Britain's ratification of the Lisbon treaty, and expressed concerns about proposals for the creation of a 'European Rapid Reaction Force'. In February 2010, he wrote a pamphlet for the Social Market Foundation thinktank entitled "EU Social Market and Social Policy". Owen supports the referendum requirements within the European Union Act 2011.

Lord Owen continued to argue for engagement, criticising David Cameron's so-called 'veto' in December 2011 and arguing instead for a formal non-eurozone grouping with the right to join or leave the eurozone. In June 2012 Lord Owen published Europe Restructured, outlining a blueprint for restructuring the EU to allow for those countries that wish to be part of a more integrated eurozone to be facilitated while those who may only want to belong to a Single Market community are enabled to do so. He stated that a referendum on the UK's relationship with the EU was inevitable.

In February 2016, he announced that he was backing the UK leaving the EU for the 2016 referendum, arguing that "There are many positive aspects to leaving the EU. ... It could be the spark we need to re-energise our nation: a challenge and an opportunity." He supported Vote Leave and has spoken at rallies against the Transatlantic Trade and Investment Partnership, which Owen stated would put the NHS in danger. Owen also cited his support for Brexit due to his opposition to the concept of a United States of Europe and stated that the Eurozone was “broken”, condemning how the EU treated Greece during its debt crisis.

Owen was interviewed in 2012 as part of The History of Parliament's oral history project.

=== Ukraine ===
In February 2022 he signed a letter to the Financial Times, alongside Robert Skidelsky and others, about Ukraine, in which he said, "NATO governments have rightly said they are willing to address Russia’s security concerns, but then say in the same breath that Russia has no legitimate security concerns because NATO is a purely defensive alliance. Whether we like it or not, a NATO that now borders Russia and could in future border even more of Russia is seen by Russia as a security concern."

== Enterprises and affiliations ==
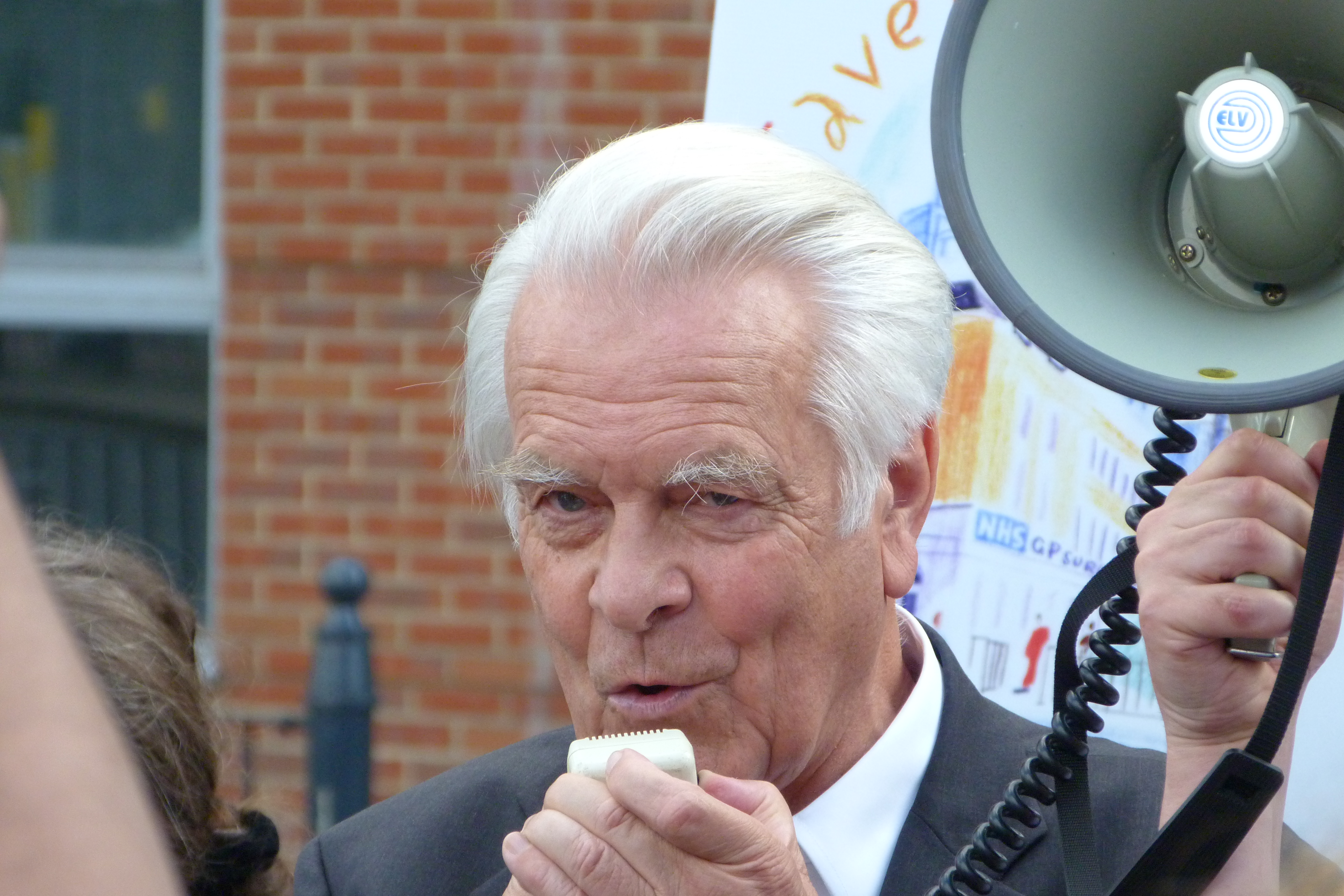
Owen at a march in Limehouse in 2014

Lord Owen was chairman of Yukos International UK BV, a division of the former Russian petroleum company Yukos, from 2002 to 2005. and a member of the board of Abbott Laboratories, a US healthcare company, from 1996 to 2011. He was non-executive chairman of Europe Steel Ltd and consultant to Epion Holdings, owned by Alisher Usmanov until 2015. From 2009 to 2014 Lord Owen served on the board of Texas-based Hyperdynamics Corporation, an oil concern with an exclusive lease to an offshore area of the Republic of Guinea in west Africa. He also served on the board of Coats Viyella from 1994 to 2001.

Owen was the Chancellor of the University of Liverpool, from 1996 to 2009. He has written extensively on the interaction between illness and politics, with a particular emphasis on the 'hubris syndrome', a condition affecting those at the pinnacle of power. The concept has been most fully developed in a co-authored paper in Brain. The concept of hubris syndrome has been analysed by Professor Gerald Russell. Lord Owen is chairman of the Trustees of the Daedalus Trust established to promote and provide funds for the interdisciplinary study of how 'the intoxication of power' in all walks of life can affect personality and decision making.

== Personal life ==
He married American, Deborah Owen (née Schabert), a highly successful literary agent, in 1968. The couple have two sons, one daughter and four grandchildren. The former MP turned author, Jeffrey Archer, was looking for a lucrative publishing deal for his first book, Not a Penny More, Not a Penny Less, to escape his imminent bankruptcy and approached Owen for an introduction to Deborah, to act as his agent. For Archer's third novel, Kane and Abel, she auctioned the publishing rights for $3 million, for which Archer received a $1 million book advance.

== In popular culture ==
Owen was a main character in Steve Waters' 2017 play Limehouse, which premiered at the Donmar Warehouse; Owen was portrayed by Tom Goodman-Hill, with Nathalie Armin playing his wife.

== Selected publications ==
- David Owen, The Politics of Defence (Jonathan Cape and Taplinger Pub. Co, 1972)
- David Owen, In Sickness and in Health: the Politics of Medicine (Quartet Books, 1976)
- David Owen, Human Rights (Jonathan Cape and W.W. Norton & Company, 1978)
- David Owen, Face the Future (Jonathan Cape and Praeger, 1981)
- David Owen, A Future That Will Work (Viking 1984, Praeger, 1985)
- David Owen, A United Kingdom (Penguin Books, 1986)
- David Owen to Kenneth Harris, Personally Speaking (Weidenfeld and Nicolson, 1987)
- David Owen, Our NHS (Pan Books, 1988)
- David Owen, Time to Declare (Michael Joseph, 1992)
- David Owen, Balkan Odyssey (Victor Gollancz, Harcourt Brace 1995)
- David Owen, The Hubris Syndrome: Bush, Blair and the Intoxication of Power (Politico's, 2007; updated edition 2012)
- David Owen, In Sickness and in Power: Illness in Heads of Government During the Last 100 Years (Methuen, 2008; revised edition 2011) and "In Sickness and In Power. Illness in Heads of Government, Military and business leaders since 1900" (Methuen, 2016)
- David Owen, Time to Declare: Second Innings (Politico's, 2009) – revised and updated abridgement of Time to Declare and Balkan Odyssey
- David Owen, Nuclear Papers (Liverpool University Press, 2009)
- David Owen, Europe Restructured (Methuen, 2012)
- David Owen, "The Health of the Nation. NHS in Peril" (Methuen, 2014)
- David Owen, The Hidden Perspective: the Military Conversations 1906–1914 (Haus Publishing, 2014)
- David Owen, "Cabinet's Finest Hour. The Hidden Agenda of May 1940" (Haus Publishing, 2016)
- David Owen, Riddle, Mystery, and Enigma. Two Hundred Years Of British–Russian Relations (Haus Publishing, 2021)

== Sources ==
- Harris, Kenneth (1988). David Owen: Personally Speaking. Pan Books. ISBN 0-330-30608-1.

Parliament of the United Kingdom
| Preceded by Ian Fraser | Member of Parliament for Plymouth Sutton; 1966 – 1974 | Succeeded by Alan Clark |
| Preceded by Joan Vickers | Member of Parliament for Plymouth Devonport; 1974–1992 | Succeeded by David Jamieson |
Political offices
| Preceded by Anthony Crosland | Foreign Secretary; 1977–1979 | Succeeded by The Lord Carrington |
| Preceded by Francis Pym | Shadow Foreign Secretary; 1979 | Succeeded by Peter Shore |
| Preceded by Tom King | Shadow Secretary of State for Energy; 1979–1980 | Succeeded by Merlyn Rees |
Party political offices
| New office | Deputy Leader of the Social Democratic Party; 1982–1983 | Position abolished |
| Preceded by Roy Jenkins | Leader of the Social Democratic Party; 1983–1987 | Succeeded by Robert Maclennan |
| New office | Leader of the 'continuing' Social Democratic Party; 1988–1990 | Position abolished |
Orders of precedence in the United Kingdom
| Preceded by The Lord Wakeham | Gentlemen; Baron Owen | Followed by The Lord Eatwell |
