= Mary Tanner =

British academic

Dame Mary Tanner DBE
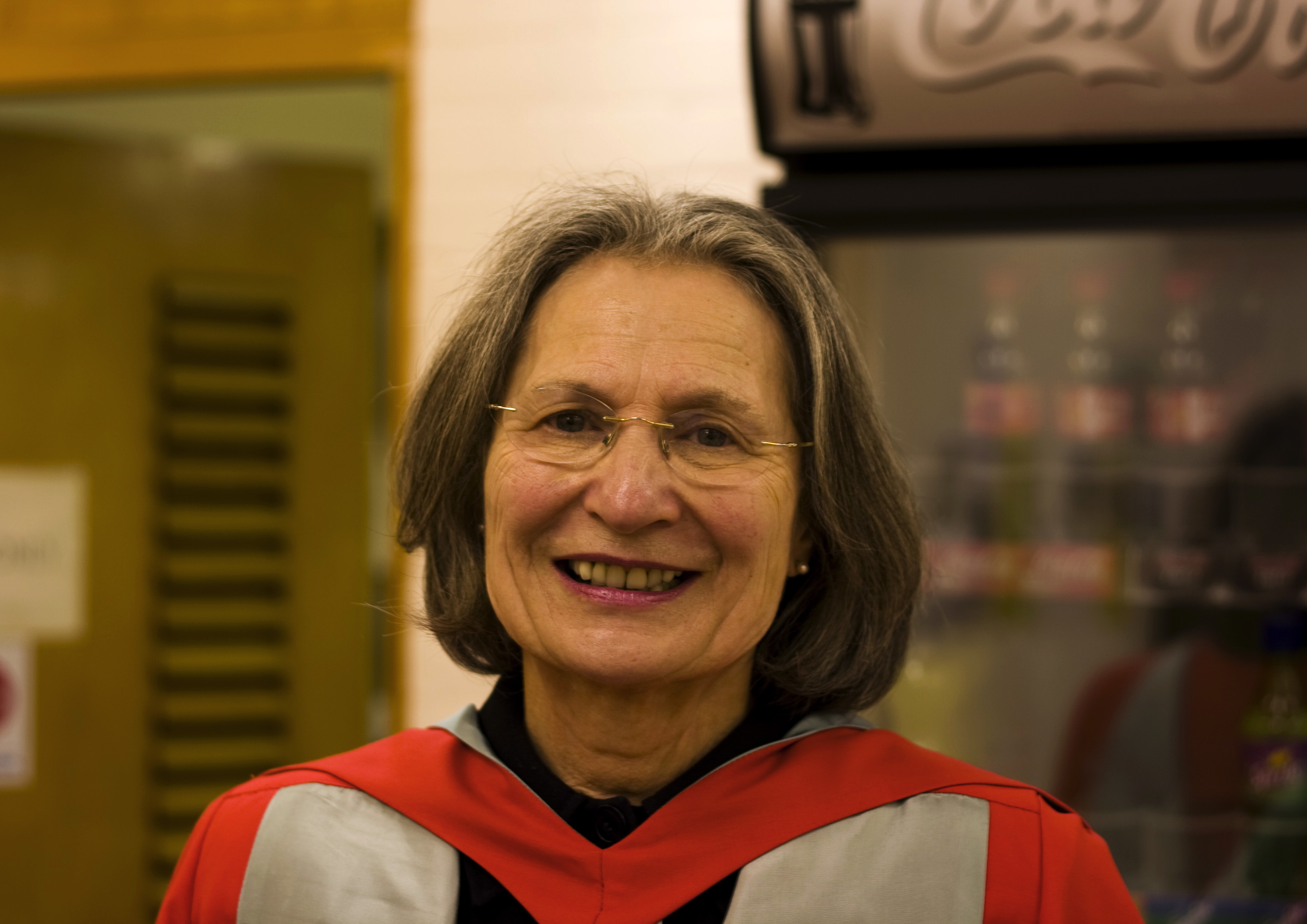
- Tanner in 2010
- Born: Mary Elizabeth Fussell; 23 July 1938 (age 88)
- Education: University of Birmingham

Dame Mary Elizabeth Tanner, DBE (née Fussell; born 23 July 1938) is a British academic specialising in the Old Testament. She was European President of the World Council of Churches (WCC) from 2006 to 2013 and has been a member of the WCC Faith and Order Commission since 1974, serving as its moderator from 1991 to 1998.

== Early life ==
Tanner was born on 23 July 1938 to Harold and Marjorie (née Teucher) Fussell. Her parents were Anglican converts. Her mother was originally a Roman Catholic and her father was originally a Methodist. She was educated at Colston's Girls' School, then an all-girls private school in Bristol.

She studied theology at the University of Birmingham and graduated with a Bachelor of Arts (BA Hons) degree.

== Career ==
From 1960 to 1967, Tanner was a lecturer in the Old Testament and Hebrew at the University of Hull. From 1972 to 1975, she was a lecturer in the Old Testament and Hebrew at the University of Bristol. From 1978 to 1982, she was a lecturer in the Old Testament at Westcott House, an Anglican theological college in Cambridge. In 1988 and in 1998, she was a visiting professor at the General Theological Seminary, an Episcopal theological college in New York City, United States. In 2000, she was a visiting professor at the Pontifical University of Saint Thomas Aquinas, a Pontifical university in Rome, Italy.

Tanner has been involved in various ecumenical conversations on behalf of the Church of England, including the Anglican-Roman Catholic conversations. From 1982 to 1998 she was active in the Church of England body which ultimately became the Council for Christian Unity.

== Honours ==
In the 2008 New Year Honours, she was appointed a Dame Commander of the Order of the British Empire (DBE) "for services to the worldwide Anglican Communion".

In January 2010, she was awarded an honorary Doctor of Divinity (DD) degree by the University of Hull.

In 1998, she was the recipient of a Festschrift titled "Community, Unity, Communion: Essays in Honour of Mary Tanner" and edited by Colin Podmore.
