= Windhill =

Coordinates: 57.50039°N 4.45207°W

Windhill: Scottish Gaelic: Cnoc na Gaoithe
- Standing stone at Windhill, with Ben Wyvis in the background

- Location within the Ross and Cromarty area
- OS grid reference: NH531482
- Council area: Highland
- Lieutenancy area: Ross and Cromarty
- Country: Scotland
- Sovereign state: United Kingdom
- Post town: Beauly
- Postcode district: IV4 7
- Police: Scotland
- Fire: Scottish
- Ambulance: Scottish
- UK Parliament: Ross, Skye and Lochaber
- Scottish Parliament: Skye, Lochaber and Badenoch

Windhill (Scottish Gaelic: Cnoc na Gaoithe) is a hamlet in Ross and Cromarty, in the Highland council area of Scotland, about halfway between the villages of Beauly and Muir of Ord, beside the A862. It is just to the north of a small stream which marks the boundary of Ross and Cromarty with Inverness-shire, which is also often considered to be the western boundary of the Black Isle.

There are several standing stones near Windhill. One of them, known as Clach an t-Seasaidh, is said to be referred to in a prophecy by the Brahan Seer.
