= John Fleming (Devonport MP) =

John Fleming, from Bigadon in Devon (near Buckfastleigh), was a British Conservative Party politician who sat in the House of Commons as a Member of Parliament (MP) for Devonport for less than a year before his election was overturned.

Fleming first stood for Parliament at the Devonport by-election in June 1865, when he was defeated by the Liberal Party candidate Thomas Brassey. At the general election in July 1865 he won the seat, but an election petition led to the election of both of Devonport's MPs being declared void on 9 May 1866.

He did not stand again until the 1874 general election, when he was an unsuccessful candidate in Barnstaple.

Parliament of the United Kingdom
| Preceded by Thomas Brassey; William Ferrand | Member of Parliament for Devonport; 1865 – 1866; With: William Ferrand | Succeeded by Lord Eliot; Montague Chambers |
