= William Eliot, 4th Earl of St Germans =

William Gordon Cornwallis Eliot, 4th Earl of St Germans (14 December 1829 – 19 March 1881), known as Lord Eliot from 1864 to 1877, was a British diplomat and Liberal politician. He was also a president of the Church of England Society for the Maintenance of the Faith.

== Life and career ==
Eliot was born at Port Eliot, Cornwall, the third but eldest surviving son of Edward Granville Eliot, 3rd Earl of St Germans, and his wife Jemima (née Cornwallis). He was educated at Eton College and then joined the Diplomatic Service. His assignments included:

- Attaché at Hanover from 1849 to 1853
- Attaché at Lisbon from 1851 to 1853
- 2nd Paid Attaché at Berlin from 1853 to 1857
- 1st Paid Attaché at Constantinople from 1857 to 1858
- 1st Paid Attaché at Saint Petersburg from 1858 to 1859
- Secretary of Legation at Rio de Janeiro in 1859
- Secretary of Legation at Athens from 1859 to 1861
- Secretary of Legation at Lisbon from 1860 to 1861
- Chargé d'Affaires at Rio de Janeiro from 1861 to 1863
- Acting Secretary of Legation at Washington, D.C. from 1863 to 1864

He resigned in 1865 and was elected Member of Parliament for Devonport in 1866, a seat he held until 1868. In 1870 he was summoned to the House of Lords through a writ of acceleration in his father's junior title of Baron Eliot. Lord St Germans died unmarried in March 1881, aged 51 and is buried, near his mother, at Kensal Green Cemetery. He was succeeded by his younger brother, Henry.

Parliament of the United Kingdom
Preceded by William Ferrand; John Fleming	Member of Parliament for Devonport; 1866–1868; With: Montague Chambers	Succeeded by Montague Chambers; John Delaware Lewis
Peerage of the United Kingdom
Preceded by Edward Granville Eliot	Earl of St Germans; 1877–1881	Succeeded by Henry Cornwallis Eliot
Peerage of Great Britain
Preceded by Edward Granville Eliot	Baron Eliot; 1870–1881 (writ of acceleration)	Succeeded by Henry Cornwallis Eliot
