= John Mowbray =

John Mowbray or John de Mowbray may refer to:

== People ==
- John de Mowbray, 2nd Baron Mowbray (1286–1322), Lord of Tanfield and Well, Yorkshire and Governor of York
- John de Mowbray, 3rd Baron Mowbray (1310–1361), only son of the 2nd Baron Mowbray
- John de Mowbray, 4th Baron Mowbray (1340–1368), knighted by King Edward III and died en route to the Holy Land
- John de Mowbray, 1st Earl of Nottingham (1365–1383), elder son of the 4th Baron Mowbray
- John Mowbray, 2nd Duke of Norfolk (1392–1432), also Baron Segrave, Baron Mowbray and Earl Marshal of England
- John Mowbray, 3rd Duke of Norfolk (1415–1461), active during the Wars of the Roses for the Yorkists and Lancastrians
- John de Mowbray, 4th Duke of Norfolk (1444–1476), only son of the 3rd Duke, laid siege to Caister Castle in 1469
- Sir John Mowbray, 1st Baronet (1815–1899), British Conservative politician and MP
- John Mowbray (rugby league) (born 1940), Australian rugby league footballer
- John Code Mowbray (1918–1997), Justice of the Supreme Court of Nevada
- John Mowbray of Barnbougle, Scottish landowner and supporter of Mary, Queen of Scots

== Pen names ==
- John Mowbray, a pseudonym used for 13 novels by juvenile fiction author Gunby Hadath (1871–1954)
- John Mowbray, a pseudonym used for Call in the Yard (1931) by crime and thriller writer John Haslette Vahey (1881–1938)
