= Geoffrey Stern =

English academic (1935–2005)

- Born: 5 February 1935; Liverpool, England
- Died: 3 October 2005 (aged 70)
- Occupations: Academic, broadcaster, composer
- Children: Jonty Stern and Tiffany Stern

Academic background
- Education: London School of Economics (PhD)

Academic work
- School or tradition: English school
- Doctoral students: Geoffrey Roberts
- Notable students: Richard Perle
- Main interests: International Communism

Geoffrey Howard Stern (5 February 1935 – 3 October 2005) was an English academic in the field of international relations, a radio personality on the BBC World Service, and a composer.

== Biography ==
Stern's father Malcolm was an accountant and his mother Rose a piano teacher; his paternal grandfather had immigrated to Britain from Dąbrowa Tarnowska in Austrian Poland in the late 19th century and settled in Essex.

Born in Liverpool and raised in London, Stern was educated at St Marylebone Grammar School, with a wartime spell in Bournemouth. He then took his undergraduate degree and a PhD in international relations from the London School of Economics and Political Science. From 1960, he taught for LSE's Department of International Relations and external programme until retiring in 2001 as a senior lecturer.

Stern was a radio personality for over forty years since applying to work for the BBC as a postgraduate student. He presented the programmes 24 Hours and Newshour on the BBC World Service, and interviewed a number of world leaders. In the early 1980s, he organised a week-long covert trip for a group of British journalists to the People's Socialist Republic of Albania. An expert in International Communism, he was much in demand on radio and television shows at the deaths of Leonid Brezhnev, Yuri Andropov and Konstantin Chernenko and at the fall of the Berlin Wall in 1989.

He was also a composer, who had maintained contact with Ralph Vaughan Williams as a teenager. A concert of his works was performed at LSE's Shaw Library in 2001.

His son is the former Big Brother contestant Jonty Stern and his daughter is the theatre historian Tiffany Stern.

== Select publications ==
- Fifty Years of Communism, London: Ampersand, 1967
- The Rise and Decline of International Communism, Aldershot: Edward Elgar Publishing, 1990
- (ed.) Atlas of Communism, New York: Macmillan, 1991
- (ed.) Communism: An Illustrated History from 1848 to the Present Day, London: Amazon, 1991
- Leaders and Leadership, London: BBC/The London School of Economics, 1993
- The Structure of International Society: An Introduction to the Study of International Relations, Pinter Publishers, 1995 (2nd edn. London: Continuum, 2003)
