= Stanley Victor Keeling =

British philosopher (1894-1979)

- Born: 9 August 1894; Islington, England
- Died: 28 November 1979 (aged 85); Paris, France
- Occupation: Philosopher
- Notable work: Descartes
- Honours: Master-Mind Lecture (1948)

Stanley Victor Keeling (9 August 1894 – 28 November 1979), usually cited as S. V. Keeling, was a British philosopher, formerly a reader at University College London (UCL). He is best known for his 1934 monograph Descartes, printed in a second edition in 1968, which for decades served as the standard English introduction to the philosophy of Descartes. Keeling is also known for his 1934 annotated edition of Philosophical Studies by J. M. E. McTaggart. Honouring his passion for ancient, especially Greek, philosophy the UCL Department of Philosophy administer an annual memorial lecture, biennial colloquium and a postgraduate scholarship in ancient philosophy in his name.

== Biography ==
Stanley Keeling was born, the younger of two sons to an ironmonger, in Islington on 9 August 1894. He completed his childhood studies at Southend Secondary School, Essex, in (or around) 1911. On leaving school, Keeling worked for an estate agent. He also turned his hand to what he termed "mere journalism" which eventually led to his entering into the employ of psychologist and journal editor Charles S. Myers. Later friend Edward Senior reports that he could get "but the barest hint" of Keeling's academic work between his leaving school and the start of his university career in 1919, but suggests "it is fair to assume" that his education during that time, "with its leaning toward philosophy, was entirely self-directed."

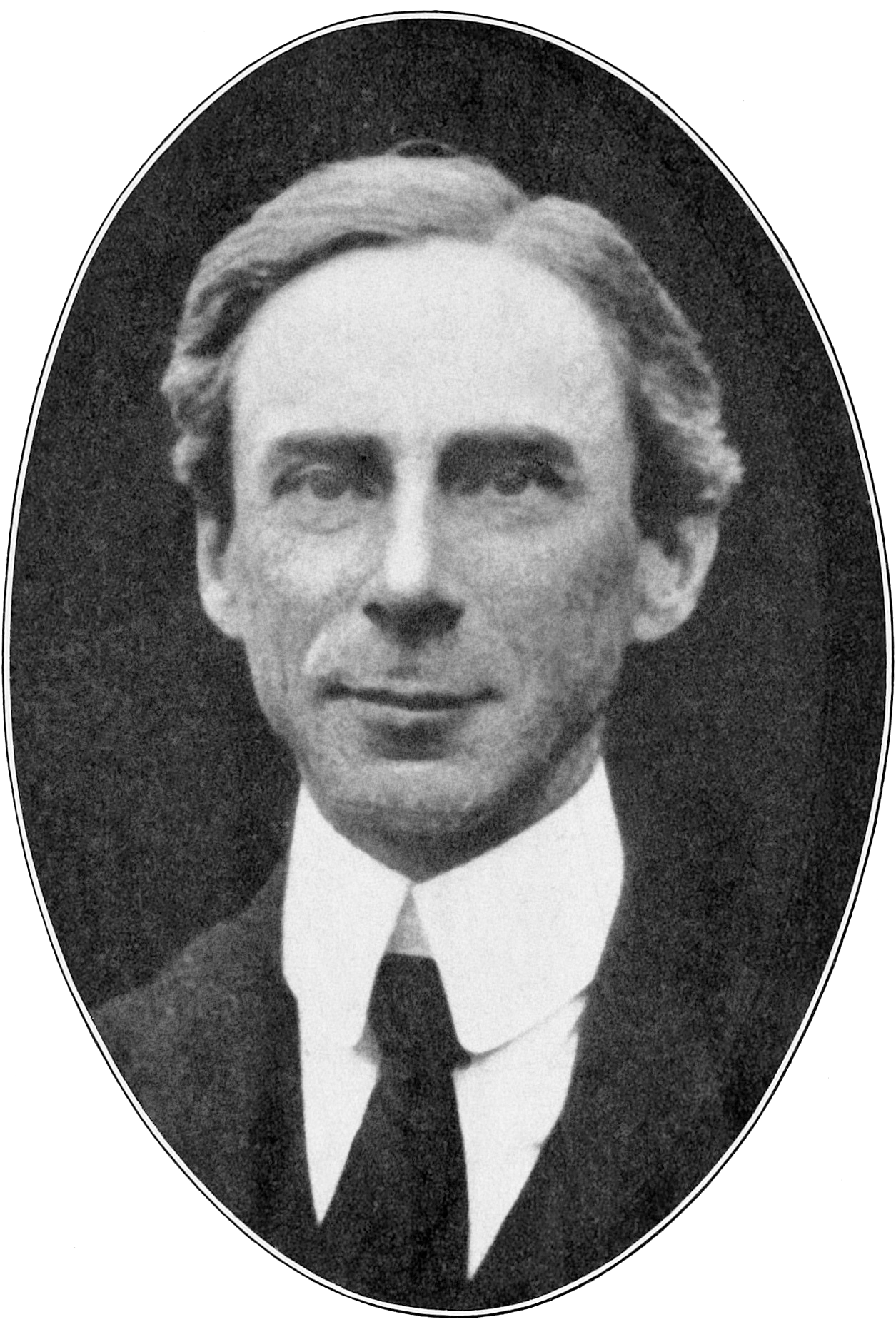
Bertrand Russell (1916)

As a conscientious objector to World War I, Keeling refused to submit to conscription as demanded by the Military Service Act 1916. He was thus arrested and convicted in court martial in January 1917. Senior reports that archival records from witnesses of The Society of Friends (of which Keeling was not himself a member) show him to have been incarcerated at Wormwood Scrubs on 2 February 1917 and, by 29 August of that year, at Dartmoor Prison. The latter, from the end of 1916. operated as Princetown Work Centre, a Home Office work camp for conscientious objectors. Internees were expected to work within the Centre, some sewing mailbags or, more commonly, on the moors, crushing grain or stone-breaking and carting granite at a quarry but enjoyed comparative comfort and relative liberty in return. Keeling, however, as "an absolutist i.e. one who refused any co-operation at all with the war effort" endured, as Senior recounts, "the harshest Military imprisonment" and resulting frail health. Thus Keeling came to the attention of the No-Conscription League (NCF) and its prestigious supporter Bertrand Russell who, Senior asserts, "doubtless.. was to some degree effective in urging a few exceptional privileges" for him. Keeling's exact date of release is unknown but, Senior suggests, it would have been not long before 10 April 1919.

In June 1919 Keeling enrolled at University College London but it was not until October 1920 that he took on an advised curriculum. This was under George Dawes Hicks who, in 1904, had become the first appointed Professor of Moral Philosophy at UCL (the Chair having previously gone unfilled). After his death, Keeling would describe Hicks as a teacher "wholly engrossed in philosophy" who "firmly believed that it, as no other subject, could impart to his students an influence and a training such as would render them habitually reflective about their existence and destiny".

J. M. E. McTaggart (1917)

Bertrand Russell, along with Alfred North Whitehead, convinced Keeling to continue his studies at Trinity College, Cambridge. He was admitted to the same in October 1922 as "pensioner with exhibition" and, was awarded his BA there in 1924. The philosophy taught at Cambridge at the time was, however, largely a disappointment to him. The sole exception reportedly being J. M. E. McTaggart who Keeling "held in the highest esteem as the only original metaphysician" of the century. Richard Wollheim, a later colleague at UCL from 1949, described Keeling as "a disciple of McTaggart who thought him right "on nearly all topics" apart from "one which left.. a bitter taste" – whilst Keeling was a pacifist, "McTaggart was rabidly militaristic."

On completion of his BA Keeling was awarded (with Russell's support in solicitation) the John Stuart Mill Scholarship in Philosophy of Mind and Logic, which is administered by UCL. This was renewed for a second year and allowed Keeling to spend the two years following graduation studying abroad in, as he chose, France. He first attended the University of Toulouse where he was awarded a certificat d'études supérieures, then the University of Montpellier, where, in 1925, he presented his thesis La nature de l'expérience chez Kant et chez Bradley and was awarded his Docteur ès lettres (D. ès L.). Keeling was also to be honored in France as an officier d' Académie. The scholar's obituary in The Times noted that although philosophy was his "consuming passion from early adolescence" Keeling "found a second love in the wine and food and conversation of France". And that during his working life "he returned whenever possible to France, to Provence or to his splendid apartment in... Paris". (Indeed Richard Wollheim described Keeling as having lived in Paris and come over weekly to deliver his lectures.)

In December 1925, Keeling received a testimonial letter from Russell – who described his knowledge as "remarkable for so a young man" and his D. ès L thesis as "a most scholarly piece of work" – to use in support for applications for lectureship positions. Declining a fellowship at Harvard University, in 1927 Keeling took up a position as a philosophy lecturer at UCL (which had awarded him a degree of Master of Arts with "mark of distinction" the previous year). There he was successively appointed as senior lecturer and then reader. University College London would also award Keeling a Doctor of Letters degree. As was noted in his obituary, Keeling's combination of the Docteur ès Lettres and Doctor Litterarum was an "unusual distinction". The latter was awarded in 1939 – at the end of the decade during which Keeling had published his most famous scholarly works – and shortly before the outbreak of World War II (during part of which Keeling acted as Head of Department).

Wollheim recalls that A. J. Ayer (who was at UCL as Grote Professor from 1944 until 1959) liked Keeling, and particularly talking to him in French but that "the feeling was not reciprocated". On the announcement of Keeling's decision to retire, Ayer paid for an expensive dinner in his honor but that Keeling "without waiting for Freddie's panegyric, announced to us all that he had been chased out of philosophy by some new wave, of which 'you' he said pointing at Freddie, 'are a major agent—no', he went on, 'I flatter you, you could never be more than a minor agent'". Ayer, Wollheim reports, was amused: "'What a rogue' he used to say afterwards—'rogue' being quite a term of endearment which he applied to most of his older philosophical colleagues in the other London colleges".

Ayer himself recalls Keeling as a "good philosophical scholar" who "from the very start ... behaved to me with unfailing courtesy." And that although Keeling "served the department loyally for several more years" after his own appointment, "it was clearly a relief to him when he was able to retire and settle for good in his beloved France."

The Times obituary report's that Keeling's "thirst for depth and precision" could be satisfied "only precariously among his philosophical colleagues at London". But that he had found "some relief" whilst employed at UCL through the conversations he had had with Émile Meyerson, Léon Robin, and Étienne Gilson during his frequent returns to France. (The latter of which he had described in Descartes as a "prince among Cartesian scholars".) Keeling retired in 1954 to Paris with his wife and died there on 28 November 1979.

Keeling, who died a widower, left his estate to a friend and former student with the wish that it be used to fund an annual lecture on Greek philosophy at UCL.

== Works ==
- Logic and Reasoning (1929). Published by Ernest Benn Ltd., (London) as no. 83 in Benn's Sixpenny Library series.
- "McTaggart's Metaphysics" in: Dickinson, Goldsworthy Lowes (ed.), J. McT. E. McTaggart, (Cambridge, 1931).
- Descartes (Ernest Benn Ltd., 1934 in the Leaders of Philosophy series; 2nd edn, Oxford, 1968). (Ed. with intro.)
- (ed.) Philosophical Studies by the Late J. Mct. Ellis Mctaggart (1934; repr. with a new Introduction by Gerald Rochelle, Bristol, 1996).
- Descartes: Annual Lecture on a Master Mind. Henriette Hertz Trust of the British Academy, Proceedings of the British Academy, vol. 34 (1948), pp. 57–81; and separately as monograph (1948).
- Time and Duration: An Unfinished Essay, ed. by Gerald Rochelle, with an introduction by Edward Senior (Little Wenlock, 1990).
