= Tolley (company) =

British publishing company

Tolley is a British publishing company that publishes reference books on tax.

== History ==
The company was established in 1916 by Charles H. Tolley.

In the 1970s Tolley was part of the Benn Group of companies. The Benn companies were taken over by the Extel Group in June 1983, which itself was taken over by United Newspapers in 1987. In 1996 the company was acquired by the publisher Butterworths, part of the Reed Elsevier group of companies, which now exists as LexisNexis UK but continues to publish under the Butterworths imprint.

== Products ==
- Tolley's Tax Guide, a full UK tax reference
- Tolley Guidance and Tolley Library (online) - UK tax legislation and tax cases

== See also ==
- Taxation in the United Kingdom
