= New Mermaids =

New Mermaids is a series of critical editions of important English plays. They were published from the early 1960s by Ernest Benn Limited and later by A & C Black. They feature lengthy introductions and annotated texts in modern spellings. Most New Mermaids editions are of English Renaissance plays, but the series also includes some Restoration drama and plays by Oscar Wilde.

Originally, the cover art for the volumes featured drawings of theatres of an appropriate era by C. Walter Hodges. Today, they feature a colourful, collage-style design.

The current general editors are Brian Gibbons of the University of Münster, William C. Carroll of Boston University and Tiffany Stern of University College, Oxford.

The New Mermaids was the successor to the earlier Mermaid Series, a major collection of reprints of texts from English Elizabethan, Jacobean and Restoration drama.
