= John Haslette Vahey =

British writer

John George Haslette Vahey
- Born: 5 March 1881; Belfast, Antrim, Ireland
- Died: 15 June 1938 (aged 57); Bournemouth, Hampshire, England
- Other names: John Haslette Vahey; John Haslette; Walter Proudfoot; Henrietta Clandon; Vernon Loder; Arthur N. Timony; John Mowbray; George Varney
- Occupation: Author of Detective Fiction
- Years active: 1909–1938
- Known for: Collins Crime Club Novels written as Vernon Loder
- Notable work: The Shop Window Murders

John George Haslette Vahey (5 March 1881 – 15 June 1938) was a Northern Irish author of detective fiction in the genre's Golden Age in the 1920s and 1930s. Although his work has remained largely out of print since the end of the golden age, he is now enjoying a resurgence of popularity, and some of his work is again in print, or available as e-books.

== Early life ==
Vahey was born in Belfast, Ireland on 5 March 1881, the second son of Herbert Vahey (c. 1839 – 6 December 1910), an Inland Revenue Inspector, and Jane Lowry (c. 1850 – 2 April 1930), who had married on 20 February 1879, at the Weslyn Church in Donegall Square, Belfast. He attended Foyle College in Derry and was also educated at Hannover.

The 1901 census found Vahey living with his parents at 4 Sydenham Avenue, Victoria, County Down, Ireland. He was an apprentice architect. After four years as an architect's pupil he switched careers and took the exams necessary to become a chartered accountant. He abandoned this career when he started writing fiction, only returning to it during the First World War where he served in Wales as a Corporal in the Army Pay Corps.

== Authorship and marriage ==
The 1911 census found Vahey in lodgings with his elder brother Herbert Lowry Vahey (Note: Herbert was a widower in 1911, having married, on 11 July 1899, Millicent Fanny Townsend (c. 1872 – 5 June 1908), the second daughter of Mark Townsend, the former Collector of Internal Revenue for Belfast. She died before their tenth anniversary.) (6 December 1879 – 9 January 1958) at Venetian House, Westhill Road, Bournemouth, Hampshire, England. Herbert has continued with architecture, but was also writing both short fiction for the magazines and published two novels in 1911, both with Stanley Paul. (Note: In the 1939 registrar for England and Wales, Herbert gives his profession as Author – working at home (he was 60 then). He may have been using a pseudonym, as the last fiction found under his own name were short pieces in 1921.) The first, A Prisoner in Paradise, about a man who finds his home in the tropics, was favourably received. The second, Camilla Forgetting herself, a story of all conquering love, which was lambasted by the critics.

Vahey had also published short fiction in the magazines and two novels which were very well received. He now recorded his profession as author. Vahey married Gertrude Crowe Barendt (c. 1880 – 6 November 1958) on 12 June in Poole, Dorset, England. The couple lived in London after the war, and at 5 Elms Avenue, Hendon, Middlesex, in the mid-1920s, and eventually settled at Branksome Park, in Bournemouth. It is not clear when they moved to Bournemouth, certainly it was in the late 1920s as the electoral register for 1925 found them in Hendon, and by 1931 Vahey had writing to The Observer talking about a grey squirrel raiding a nest that he had seen two years previously in Bournemouth.

Moss reports that the jacket biography on Loder's Two Dead (1934), states that Vahey's initial attempt at writing a novel was when he was in bed convalescent. The same bio make a number of claims:

- Vahey once wrote a novel on a boarding-house table in twenty days, serialised in both England and the US under different names.
- He worked very quickly, and thought two hours in the morning quite enough for anyone.
- He composed directly on a typewriter, and did not ever re-write.

=== Writing as John Haslette ===
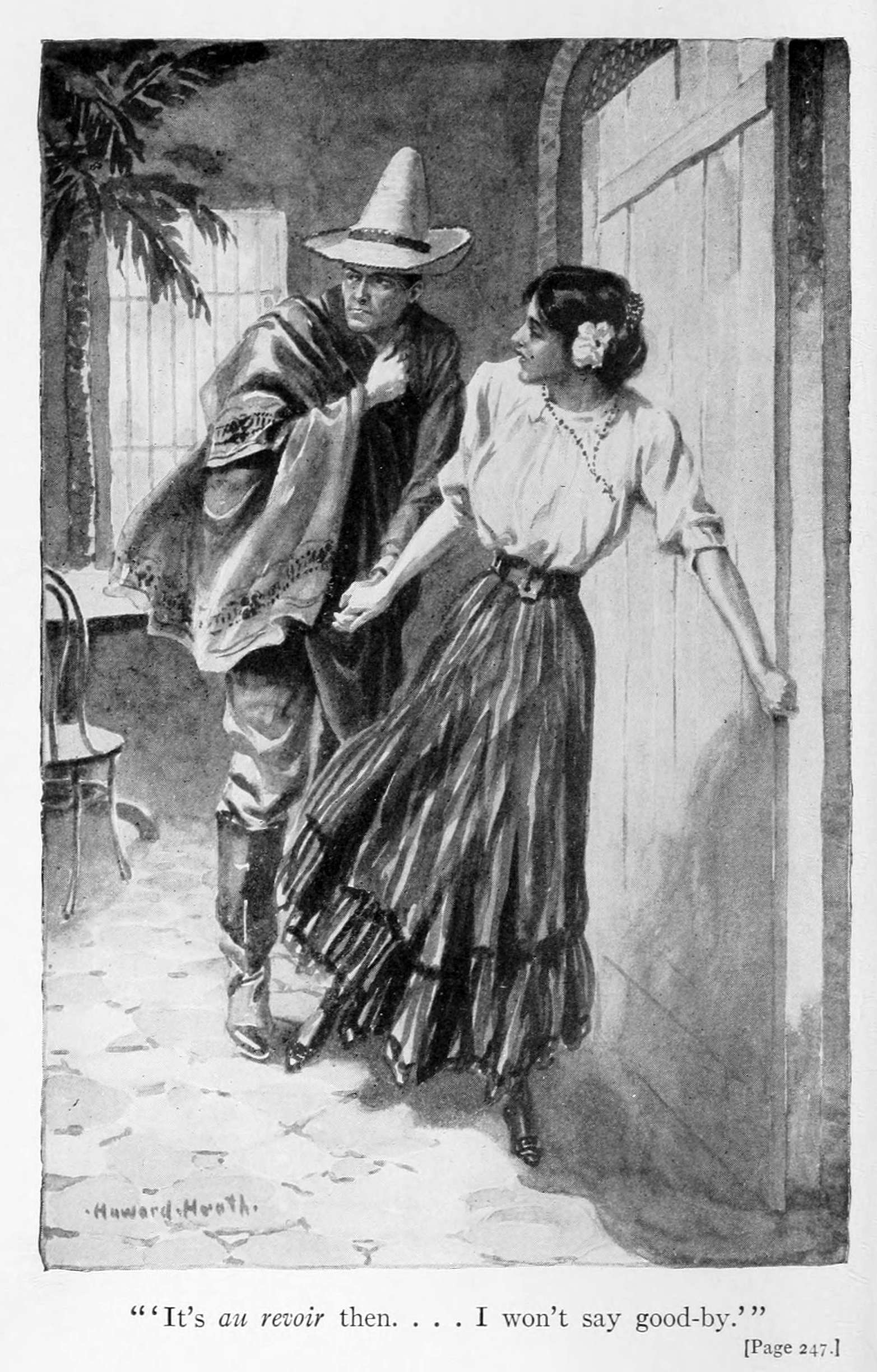
Frontispiece illustration for Desmond Rourke, Irishman by Howard Heath

Vahey began writing under the name John Haslette derived from joining his first and third given names. He published short magazine fiction and seven novels under this name between 1909 and 1917, when he enlisted in the army. His first novel was The Passion of the President, set in South America and centred abound the political struggle between the President of a country and his bitterest enemy. The book was very well received, judging by the reviewers' quotations in the publisher's display advertisements:

- South American Presidents have a way of being embroiled in a breathless game of political check and counter check. In this Mr. Haslette gives a good account of himself, Somebody always has a scrape to get out of, and the puzzled reader is on tenterhooks to see how he will do it. — The Times
- An interesting and effective story of love and intrigue. ... If this is a first novel the author has begun well. — The Globe
- Don Ramon is a personage to be remembered. . . . The book can recommended as a good example of a class of novel that never seems to lose its attraction. — The Outlook
- Mr Haslette's story grips one at once. His name is new to us, but we expect to see it soon again. — Daily Chronicle
- Mr. Haslette writes with as pretty a touch and as engaging a style as one has observed for long time. . . . If a tithe of the novels were turned out in this fashion in literary term, what happy world it would be. — Northern Whig

Five of the John Halsette novels were set in Latin America.

Novels published under the name John Haslette
| No. | Year | Title | Publisher | Pages | Notes |
|---|---|---|---|---|---|
| 1 | 1909 | The Passion of the President | Everett & Co, London | 320 p., 8º | (Note: A novel set in South America and centred around the political struggle between the President of a South American republic and his bitterest enemy. A reviewer said: There is abundance of movement in this work, which will be found highly entertaining.) |
| 2 | 1910 | The Carven Ball | Digby, Long & Co, London | 317 p., 8º | (Note: A mix of novel, thriller, and whodunnit. The plot hinges on a murder mystery, and the efforts of the police and an amateur detective to solve it, set against a frenetic car chase. A reviewer commented: the author . . . cleverly succeeds in keeping the reader in suspense as to the solution of the mystery until the last few pages are reached.) |
| 3 | 1911 | Desmond Rourke, Irishman | Sampson Low, London | 308 p., 8º | (Note: A novel set in Latin America. The hero, an Irish adventurer stirs thing us and brings about the denouement of a mystery from a generation earlier. The novel combines stirring adventure, with a love story, and a dollop of quiet humour. A reviewer commented: There are some well-drawn characters, and the interest never flags.) |
| 4 | 1912 | The Mesh | Sampson Low, London | 319 p., 8º | (Note: A novel set in South America. Initially serialised in the Sunday Chronicle from June 1912. The plot is centred about a robbery from a bank managed by an Englishman. The robbery has been carried out by the President to meet the expenses of his mistress. The bank manager is sacked and turns to drink until the arrival of his fiancee puts him back on his feet.) |
| 5 | 1913 | The Shadow of Salvador | Heath Cranton & Ouseley, London | 320 p., 8º | (Note: A novel set in an insurrection in South America. The Irish hero Connor is locked in a struggle with the traitorous chief of the rebellion and his lustful lieutenant, interwoven with a charming romance. A reviewer judged it . . . a book that is absorbing from cover to cover.) |
| 6 | 1914 | Johnnie Maddison | Smith, Elder & Co., London | 310 p., 8º | (Note: A novel. Molly turns up in South America to marry the blackguard to whom she has in ignorance engaged herself. Johnnie Maddison is given the job of looking after her while the rogue keeps out of the way of the police. Johnnie falls in love, but behaves like a gentleman. All is resolved in the end. A reviewer summed it up with: . . . and the story is a good one.) |
| 7 | 1916 | The man who pulled the strings | Eveleigh Nash, London | 312 p., 8º | (Note: A thriller of a sort. An oil expert is accidentally thrown into a whole series of adventures through something that happens when he is out shooting wild ducks. A reviewer said The book is delightfully written, and the author succeeds in mystifying his readers sufficiently in the first half to make his solution a pleasant and unexpected surprise.) |

== Army service ==
Vahey enlisted in the Army on 23 July 1917, two months after his brother Hubert had enlisted. (Note: Hubert was initially enlisted to join the Waterways and Docks Section of the Royal Engineers Inland Water Transport Section as a draftsman, before gaining a short service commission in the Royal Air Force at the start of September 1918.) Vahey was in the Army Pay Corps in Wales. He was discharged on 14 January 1919 under paragraph 392 XVI of the King's Regulations. This paragraph refers to the discharge of a soldier no longer physically fit for war service. Vahey was awarded a 20% pension based on Debility as a result of sickness. Wales was badly affected by the Spanish Influenza pandemic in late 1918. The age group worst affected by the flu was the 25 to 45 age group. It is not certain that Vahey has debilitated by the Spanish Flu. He was only 38 years-old at the time, so his health must have been seriously compromised to have qualified for such a pension. It is notable the Vahey did not publish a novel again until the mid-1920s, another hint that he had been badly affected by whatever the illness was.

== Writing after the First World War ==
When Vahey started writing again in the 1920s he used his own name and a range of pseudonyms. His initial output was short fiction for magazines like The Cornhill Magazine, or Chambers Journal. Vahey's use of pseudonyms was quite complex, with some pseudonyms restricted to book with a particular publisher. The list of pseudonyms was taken from Gribben, which includes the Timony pseudonym, missing from other sources such as Hubin, and Kemp, but does not include the Varney pseudonym. Vahey's output works will be listed under each of the pseudonyms. It is possible that Vahey used other pseudonyms, or that there are titles that are not listed.

Pseudonym known to have been used by Vahey
| Pseudonym | Books | From | To | Notes |
|---|---|---|---|---|
| John Haslette | 7 | 1909 | 1917 | |
| John Haslette Vahey | 15 | 1925 | 1935 | (Note: This was his own name. This number includes one book on angling.) |
| Arthur N. Timony | 3 | 1925 | 1928 | |
| Anthony Lang | 5 | 1927 | 1930 | |
| George Varney | 2 | 1927 | 1929 | (Note: This name is not listed as a pseudonym of Varney's by the British Library or even given coincident birth and death dates. However Varney registered the copyright for the books under this name in the United States. Of the written sources consulted, only Moss's introductions to the reprints of the Loder books identify this pseudonym.) |
| Vernon Loder | 22 | 1928 | 1938 | |
| Walter Proudfoot | 4 | 1931 | 1933 | |
| John Mowbray | 1 | 1931 | 1931 | (Note: This pseudonym was also in used by Gunby Hadath and the total given here excluded the 13 books that appear to have been written by Hadath using this pseudonym. The attribution of books written under this name to Vahey is discussed under the section on the pseudonym.) |
| Henrietta Clandon | 7 | 1933 | 1938 | |

One of the reasons for Vahey's use of pseudonyms become clear when one notes his phenomenal productivity. He published up to seven books a year, necessitating the use of more than one identity. He only wrote seven books in total in his first eight years as a writer, up to 1917.

Number of books by year and pseudonym for writing after the First World War.
| | 1925 | 1926 | 1927 | 1928 | 1929 | 1930 | 1931 | 1932 | 1933 | 1934 | 1935 | 1936 | 1937 | 1938 |
|---|---|---|---|---|---|---|---|---|---|---|---|---|---|---|
| John Haslette Vahey | 2 | 3 | 1 | 2 | | 1 | 1 | 4 | 1 | 1 | 1 | | | |
| Arthur N. Timony | 1 | 1 | | 1 | | | | | | | | | | |
| Anthony Lang | | | 1 | 2 | 1 | 1 | | | | | | | | |
| Vernon Loder | | | | 1 | 2 | 2 | 2 | 1 | 3 | 2 | 1 | 3 | 2 | 3 |
| Walter Proudfoot | | | | | | | 1 | 1 | 2 | | | | | |
| John Mowbray | | | | | | | 1 | | | | | | | |
| Henrietta Clandon | | | | | | | | | 1 | 1 | 1 | 2 | 1 | 1 |
| All books in that year | 3 | 4 | 2 | 6 | 3 | 4 | 5 | 6 | 7 | 4 | 3 | 5 | 3 | 4 |
| Names used in the year | 2 | 2 | 2 | 4 | 2 | 3 | 4 | 3 | 4 | 3 | 3 | 2 | 2 | 2 |

=== Writing as John Haslette Vahey ===
Vahey used his own name (dropping the George) when he began writing books again in 1925. He was very productive, publishing three books in 1925 and four in 1926, using both this own name and the Timony pseudonym. The books under his own name ranged from romances to thrillers and whodunnits, with one western. He also published one illustrated children's book of verse' The New Zoo, and a collection of essays and sketches on fishing, which he selected and edited, The Humane Angler. Vahey continued to publish books under his own name until 1935.

Books written under his own name
| No | Year | Title | Publisher | Pages | Notes |
|---|---|---|---|---|---|
| 1 | 1925 | Down River | Ward, Lock & Co, London | 307 p., 8º | (Note: A thriller. Serialised in several newspapers in Australia in 1925 and 1926. A bored young wealthy Englishman travels to South America, and there goes to the rescue of an English Prima Donna who has been kidnapped after a brilliant success on stage.) |
| 2 | 1925 | Fiddlestrings | Ward, Lock & Co, London | 320 p., 8º | (Note: A thriller. Through cowardice, a prospector betrays his partner and gains immense wealth. Years later, life is going well when an envelope brings a reminder of his earlier failing. A reviewer said: The story is well told.) |
| 3 | 1926 | The Storm Lady | Ward, Lock & Co, London | 319 p., 8º | (Note: A thriller centred around the search of a cipher holding the key to the location of money hidden in anticipation of the Russian Revolution. The book is the story of the struggle between the hero and the Bolsheviks to recover the money.) |
| 4 | 1926 | Up North | Ward, Lock & Co, London | 313 p., 8º | (Note: A thriller centered around the coast of the Highlands of Scotland. The story begins with a rescue in mid-Atlantic, and involves conspiracies, smuggling, and romance. Serialised in Australia in 1926.) |
| 5 | 1926 | The New Zoo | Faber & Gwyer, London | 62 p., 8º | (Note: A book for young children. Verses about the Zoo with drawings by Marion Board. This was Vahey's only children's book, and the only one with Faber & Gwyer.) |
| 6 | 1927 | Payment Down | Ward, Lock & Co, London | 319 p., 8º | (Note: A novel which centres around the matrimonial prospects of the daughter of a self made man. She is being wooed by an impecunious nobleman but falls in love with a race-driver. Intriguingly, a reviewer says: The motor car eventually overcomes all the impediments raised to mutual happiness.) |
| 7 | 1928 | Solitude Limited | Ward, Lock & Co, London | 314 p., 8º | (Note: A mystery story set around an old house in County Donegal, Ireland, which the hero rents to enjoy some solitude. The mystery is posed by traces of human life, where no human life should be. Serialised in Australia in 1928.) |
| 8 | 1928 | The Money Barons | Ward, Lock & Co, London | 320 p., 8º | (Note: A western centred on the efforts of a villain to seize the hero's ranch so that he can put a railway line through it. The only western written by Vahey. Serialised in Australia in 1928.) |
| 9 | 1930 | Mr. Nemesis | Ward, Lock & Co, London | 127 p., 8º | (Note: Whodunnit. Serialised in Australia in 1930. Set in South Africa, a young settler has to help the police solve the mystery of a neighbour's murder. It was also issued as a paperback sixpenny copyright novel (Nº 368) by Ward, Lock & Co in 1932, by comparison, the price of the original hardback was 15 times as much at 7s. 6d. A reviewer said . . . a novel of such originality, that it will secure a real welcome from all who are on the look out for something really new . . .) |
| 10 | 1931 | Mystery at the Inn | Ward, Lock & Co, London | 317 p., 8º | (Note: Whodunnit. A man is found dead at a country inn, apparently a suicide. The inn's landlord also dies in another apparent suicide. The tea-loving Irish detective Hast has to unravel the mystery, which is centred around a vast fortune.) |
| 11 | 1932 | Death by the Gaff | Skeffington & Son, London | 287 p., 8º | (Note: A rich and elderly womanising angler is found dead in a fishing pool. Circumstantial evidence leads to unfounded suspicion, and one unjustified arrest. Detective Inspector Parfitt has to unravel the puzzle. A reviewer says: Among writers of detective fiction Mr. Vahey is a "best-seller", displaying as he does remarkable ingenuity in the invention and working out of complicated plots.) |
| 12 | 1932 | The Wavering Balance | Ernest Benn, London | 159 p., 8º | (Note: Romance novel. This was the only book that Vahey published with Ernest Benn. It was No. 18 in Benn's New Ninepenny Novels, a paperback series. A romance set in a literary atmosphere. The story is told in the first person, and the reader soon realises what the narrator does not.) |
| 13 | 1932 | Witness in Support | Skeffington & Son, London | 288 p., 8º | (Note: Whodunnit. Two private detectives set out for a country house to deal with a case of blackmail. They encounter a jewel robbery, murder, and a clever local policemen. The book was recommended as "Book of the Month" by the Crime Book Society.) |
| 14 | 1932 | The Humane Angler | Hutchinson, London | xiv, 256 p., ill., 8º | (Note: Mostly fiction, but with some fact. This is a book of angling stories and sketches collected and edited by Vahey. He not only contributes material directly through his own name, but also through his Arthur N. Timony pseudonym.) |
| 15 | 1933 | Tragic Lesson | Hutchinson, London | 287 p., 8º | (Note: Novel. A schoolboy begins his adult life by setting up as a quack doctor, makes a fortune and retires young, only to lose everything in a bogus mining venture. His troubles are not over, as he now finds himself in the dock for murder. A reviewer stated: . . . this powerful and graphically outlined story . . . is certain to add to Mr. Vahey's growing reputation and popularity.) |
| 16 | 1934 | Spies in Ambush | Eyre & Spottiswoode, London | 279 p., 8º | (Note: Thriller. A famous concert-hall pianist uses his travels to serve the foreign office. But he becomes suspected and all sorts of complications ensure, including three murders. He manages to escape with the aid of a young female violinist.) |
| 17 | 1935 | Secrets for Sale | Eyre & Spottiswoode, London | 280 p., 8º | (Note: Whodunnit The story begins when a private detective finds a body in his railway carriage. He sees an opportunity to make a name for himself, so he suppresses some evidence with a view to following it up himself. He soon learns that this was a mistake and he turns to Scotland Yard. A reviewer said: . . . it moves so quickly and so smoothly that one only begins to criticise details after laying down the book. After all, that's compliment enough!) |

=== Writing as Arthur N. Timony ===
Vahey only used the Timony pseudonym for three novels, published from 1925 to 1928. This pseudonym is sometimes overlooked and while included in the list of Vahey pseudonyms given by Gribben, Neither Hubin nor Kemp include it in their lists of Vahey pseudonyms. The Timony novels were a mixed bag, ranging from thriller to romance. They were not reviewed as positively as some of his other work.

Books written as Arthur N. Timony
| No | Year | Title | Publisher | Pages | Notes |
|---|---|---|---|---|---|
| 1 | 1925 | Blind sight | Collins, London | 310 p., 8º | (Note: Thriller of a sort. A shocking crime in the wilds of Africa leads to a chain of coincidences which end by delivering retribution. A reviewer said: The story, if not of the most probable, is exciting and moves quickly.) |
| 2 | 1926 | The Delilah of the moment | Collins, London | 300 p., 8º | (Note: A sort of Romance novel. The hero, who is a bit of a prig, flees to Australia to escape an engagement, which he considered to threaten his artistic ideals. On his journey he bounce from one woman to another, until at last he returns with some of the nonsense knocked out of him.) |
| 3 | 1928 | A Hedge without a Field | Alston Rivers, London | 315 p., 8º | (Note: A combination Whodunnit and Romance novel. A murder mystery, and a mystery about the Merit house, form the background to the romance between the two main protagonists.) |

=== Writing as Anthony Lang ===
The five Anthony Lang Books were all whodunnits. All were published by Melrose, an example of Vahey keeping a particular pseudonym with a particular publisher.

Books written as Anthony Lang
| No | Year | Title | Publisher | Pages | Notes |
|---|---|---|---|---|---|
| 1 | 1927 | The Crime | Melrose, London | 288 p., 8º | (Note: Whodunnit. One man enters a room and sits down to wait. A second enters, notices boots under a sofa, and drags out the body of his employer, a diamond merchant. Thus the tale begins.) |
| 2 | 1928 | Fly Country | Melrose, London | 287 p., 8º | (Note: A sort of whodunnit. A young female financier acquires a mining concession in Africa, and sells it to the hero. He travels to Africa, discovers a flaw in the concession, a clue to a past crime, and the prelude to another.) |
| 3 | 1928 | The Case with Three Threads | Melrose, London | 287 p., 8º | (Note: Whodunnit. A slowly paced crime thriller where the body does not appear until chapter eight. A reviewer said: . . . the book is well written, and the characters are alive — two virtues that are seldom found in mystery stories.) |
| 4 | 1929 | The Daring Diana | Melrose, London | 287 p., 8º | (Note: Whodunnit. The jewels of the guest of a wealth American are stolen from the castle he has rented to mount a pageant. The hero, a young London Lawyer has to solve the mystery, and incidentally free his love interest who has been kidnapped.) |
| 5 | 1930 | Evidence | Melrose, London | 287 p., 8º | (Note: Whodunnit. A murder mystery where the murderer has a complete alibi and an innocent party has placed himself in incriminating circumstances. The private investigator discovers the clues ignored by the police.) |

=== Writing as George Varney ===
Vahey seems to have written only two books under the Varney pseudonym. They are a thriller and a whodunnit. This is the most elusive of Vahey's pseudonyms, with relatively few sources identifying it. However the identification is without doubt as Vahey registered copyright in the United States for the books written under this name.

Books written as George Varney
| No | Year | Title | Publisher | Pages | Notes |
| 1 | 1927 | The Missing Link | Jarrolds | 287 p., 8º | (Note: Whodunnit. A rich American goes to Devonshire as the claimant of a large fortune. He is brutally murdered in the house of the late Vicar's daughter, and suspicion points first at one and then another. The mystery is unravelled by Mrs. Turnbull, a guest at the murder house.) |
| 2 | 1929 | The Bungalow of Dead Birds | T. Nelson & Sons, Ltd., London | vi, 288 p., 8º | (Note: A thriller in which a young Englishman pays five thousand pounds to buy a plantation in Malaya. On arrival at the plantation site, he finds that he has been duped, and there is no plantation, only jungle. On exploring the Jungle he finds a bungalow inhabited by an elderly Eurasian with an attractive stepdaughter. They are attacked by the natives and the father is killed. The Englishman and the girl undergo many adventures until they can reach the coast and escape.) |

=== Writing as Vernon Loder ===
Vahey's most productive pseudonym was that of Vernon Loder. Using this name he published 22 novels, all with Collins. All of those after 1930, when the Collins Crime Club was established, were Crime Club books, for crime novels and as Collins Mystery Novels for the three spy stories featuring Secret Service agent Donald Cairn. The dating of Crime Club issues is taken from the listing for Vernon Loder in Curran's Hooded Gunman: An Illustrated History of Collins Crime Club.

Books written as Vernon Loder
| No | Year | Title | Publisher | Pages | Notes |
|---|---|---|---|---|---|
| 1 | 1928 | The Mystery at Stowe | Collins, London | vi, 292 p., 8º | (Note: Whodunnit While this was published before the Collins Crime Club was established, the 2016 reprint was a Crime Club title. Ned is financing an expedition into South America for his friend Elaine, and his wife Margery is jealous, needlessly, of Elaine. Margery's body is found with a blowpipe dart in the back. In the preface to the 2016 reprint, Moss calls the novel: a well-written and carefully constructed story, which blends action, detection, human interest, and romance . . .) |
| 2 | 1929 | The Vase Mystery | Collins, London; Glasgow | 252 p., 8º | (Note: Whodunnit. The habitués of the hotel are drifting leisurely through the winter season when one of residents dies. It seems to be an accidental death, but Inspector Fox discovers something that suggests that there has been foul play. A reviewer said: Vernon Loder never imagined a cleverer plot than the one in this exciting and unusual thriller.) |
| 3 | 1929 | Whose Hand? | Collins, London | viii, 274 p., 8º | (Note: Whodunnit. A dishonest financier invites eight of his victims to his country seat. Unsurprisingly he his killed, but by whom? Published in the United States with the title Between 12 and 1, and serialised in Australia with the same title.) |
| 4 | 1930 | The Shop Window Murders | Collins, London | 252 p., 8º | (Note: Whodunnit. May have been just too early for inclusion in the Collins Crime Club initially (as it only started in 1930). It may have been under consideration for inclusion as the flap of Murders in Bucks by G. D. H. and M. Cole, a Crime Club offering for June 1930, lists The Shop Window Murders as a Crime Club title. Vahey registered the copyright for this book in the United States on 22 May 1930, whereas he registered his next book The Essex Murders, which was a Crime Club title, on 10 December 1930. In any case, the 2018 reprint, with an introduction by Nigel Moss, certainly is a Crime Club title. Also printed as a paperback in the Collins White Circle Crime Club (No. 71). When the curtain is raised on the new window display on Monday morning, passers-by are horrified to see that one of the mannequins is actually a body. Another body is quickly found in the shop. Moss says: . . . an entertaining and richly plotted example of the Golden Age deductive puzzle novel.) |
| 5 | 1930 | The Essex Murders | Collins, London | 251 p., 8º | (Note: Whodunnit. A Collins Crime Club title, October 1930. A thriller writer goes to inspect a house in the Essex marshes that he hope to rent while he writes a mystery story. Taking his fiancee with him to check out the house, the couple discover three bodies in a pond in the grounds. Features Inspector Brews. Published as The dead pool in the US. A reviewer said: A soundly constructed plot, the ingenious unwinding of a tangled skein, and more than a spice of humor, put this clever novel in the front rank of its class.) |
| 6 | 1931 | Death of an Editor | Collins, London | 251p., 8º | (Note: Whodunnit. A Collins Crime Club title, April 1931. An editor is skilled, and suspicion shifts from one to another of the guests at the country residence of a millionaire newspaper owner. After a second death, it is Inspector Brews, the official investigator, and not an amateur that solves the mystery.) |
| 7 | 1931 | Red Stain | Collins, London | 266 p., 8º | (Note: Whodunnit. A Collins Crime Club title, November 1931. A grasping and wealth moneylender is found murdered. Things look black for the chief suspect, and Inspector Gibb arrests him. New information solves the puzzle. A reviewer wrote: A very clever mystery story, with the mystery maintained to the very end.) |
| 8 | 1932 | Death in the Thicket | Collins, London | 252 p., 8º | (Note: Whodunnit. A Collins Crime Club title, May 1932. Inspector Tallis has to investigate the brutal murder of a notorious socialist Member of Parliament. There are fears that it is a political murder, but Tallis proceeds through a clever process of elimination. A reviewer called this: . . . a well-reasoned and ably-written detective story.) |
| 9 | 1933 | Death at the Wheel | Collins, London | 252 p., 8º | (Note: Whodunnit. A Collins Crime Club title, April 1933. A police constable approaches a car parked in an unauthorised area. He touches the sleeping motorist on the shoulder to rouse him and the dead man crumples up. A reviewer call it: . . . a swift-moving mystery story.) |
| 10 | 1933 | Suspicion | Collins, London | 252 p., 8º | (Note: Whodunnit. A Collins Crime Club title, October 1933. Mr Hennessy spend a lot of time on the golf links with the young and pretty wife of an elderly solicitor. Then Hennessy is found murdered on the river bank. The story is orthodox enough to start, but then a stranger to the village points to some fact suggesting that the obvious suspect may be innocent, only to have others point out that by the same logic, the stranger himself could be the murderer. A reviewer said that the story was: . . . well clear of the usual run of mystery novels.) |
| 11 | 1934 | Murder from Three Angles | Collins, London | 252 p., 8º | (Note: Whodunnit. A Collins Crime Club title, April 1934. A financier is murdered at his country house. There are three viewpoints on the murder, from the County set, who didn't approve of the financier, from the common-sense viewpoint, and from the police viewpoint. Inspector Chance displays both patience and his knowledge of human nature to bring the crime home to the guilty party.) |
| 12 | 1934 | Two Dead | Collins, London | 252 p., 8º | (Note: Whodunnit. A Collins Crime Club title, October 1934. A crooked financier emerges from prison, hoping to enjoy the money he hid during his swindles. However, he ruined many lives by his swindling, and he is soon found dead. Particularly strong as a police procedural.) |
| 13 | 1935 | Death at the horse show | Collins, London | 252 p., 8º | (Note: Whodunnit. A Collins Crime Club title, April 1935. A horse is used as a murder weapon. Scotland Yard is called in after the second death. One reviewer said that the book was not . . . up to the standard of his previous works. Another said it and the other Crime Club release that month were Good-going, straight-forward detective stories with plenty of excitement and conflicting clues in them.) |
| 14 | 1935 | The Case of the Dead Doctor | Collins, London | 252 p., 8º | (Note: Whodunnit. A Collins Crime Club title, August 1935. When a doctor is found brutally murdered in his laboratory, suspicion first falls on his nephew, who was his partner in a failing chemical works in Switzerland. Then the doctors case-book is found with mutilated pages, suggesting that some-one whose flaws had been recorded by the doctor might be responsible. Eventually Scotland Yard solves the murder. One reviewer wrote that it was not an action-packed thriller but . . . an intricate puzzle.) |
| 15 | 1936 | Ship of secrets | Collins, London | 252 p., 8º | (Note: A Collins Mystery Novel. Features Secret Service agent Donald Cairn. The agent geta a job in the galley of a ship that his target has purchased. The plot revolves around an attempt to destroy the Panama Canal. A reviewer said that the author: . . . is a craftsman, his character work is good and he can tell a very convincing story.) |
| 16 | 1936 | The Deaf-Mute Murders | Collins, London | 252 p., 8º | (Note: Whodunnit. A Collins Crime Club title, March 1936. A body of a deaf-mute is found murdered in the West-End of London. Things get even more complicated when a second deaf-mute, an apparent suicide, is found in the grounds of a hotel in North London. Superintendent Paddy Mix and Chief Inspector Thomson set out to solve the mystery.) |
| 17 | 1936 | The Little Man Murders | Collins, London | 284 p., 8º | (Note: Whodunnit. A Collins Crime Club title, July 1936. A short man, generally regarded as being a non-entity who is bullied by his wife, is the worm that turns in this mystery. Two people who have annoyed him are found dead. Inspector Trager, the art expert from Scotland Yard, puts two and two together and puts the handcuffs on the short man.) |
| 18 | 1937 | Choose Your Weapon | Collins, London | 252 p., 8º | (Note: Whodunnit. A Collins Crime Club title, March 1937. A volunteer fortune-teller at a charity bazaar is horrified to find a body in her tent when she comes back from a lunch break. Starting as the chief suspect, the fortune teller changes roles to help the police solve the mystery. A reviewer commented that the author's . . . reputation is further enhanced by his novel treatment of an unusual ending.) |
| 19 | 1937 | The Men with the Double Faces | Collins, London | 252 p., 8º | (Note: A Collins Mystery Novel. Features Secret Service agent Donald Cairn. Jewish refugees are spied upon by the enemy that drove them out of their own country. A topical subject at the time of publication.) |
| 20 | 1938 | A Wolf in the fold | Collins, London | 252 p., 8º. | (Note: Thriller. A Collins Mystery Novel. Secret Service agent Donald Cairn travels from New York, up and down England and through country houses and canal boats. Of course while the story is unfolding the reader never knows if A is spying for B, or just pretending to spy for B, while being a spy for C, or pretending to be a spy for C while posing as a spy for B, while actually spying for D. This book is described on some web-sites such as Fantastic Fiction as if it were co-authored by Donald Cairn – obviously a misinterpretation of the meaning of with Donald Cairn in descriptions.) |
| 21 | 1938 | The button in the plate | Collins, London | 252 p., 8º | (Note: Whodunnit. A Collins Crime Club title, February 1938. A wealthy bachelor has ten nieces and nephews who expect, from what he has said, to inherit his wealth. All is well until he meets a widow, and decides to marry her. He advises his beneficiaries that he is going to change his will and the widow dies the same evening.) |
| 22 | 1938 | Kill in the Ring | Collins, London | 252 p., 8º | (Note: Whodunnit. A Collins Crime Club title, October 1938. A handsome and attractive boxer dies during a match. Foul play is suspected, and confirmed by the postmortem. The obvious suspect is then arrested, but the police turn up more and more conflicting evidence. Eventually, the key clue is discovered.) |

=== Writing as Walter Proudfoot ===
The Walter Proudfoot books were mostly thrillers. Two of them feature Inspector Vallence. All of the Proudfoot books were published by Hutchinson over a three-year period from 1931 to 1933.

Books written as Walter Proudfoot
| No | Year | Title | Publisher | Pages | Notes |
|---|---|---|---|---|---|
| 1 | 1931 | Crime in the arcade | Hutchinson, London | 288 p., 8º | (Note: Whodunnit. A collapsing glass roof in an arcade kills a man but seems to be an accident. A suspicious young solicitor unravels the mystery of this and a second mysterious death with the aid of the man's niece.) |
| 2 | 1932 | The Trail of the Ruby | Hutchinson, London | 288 p., 8º | (Note: Thriller. A renegade British soldier gets his hands on a Ruby after the Russian Revolution, escapes into India and makes his way back to England where he tries to dispose of the jewel.) |
| 3 | 1933 | Arrest | Hutchinson, London | 286 p., 8º | (Note: Thriller. Serialised in Australia as The Trail of the Fugitive. Inspector Vallance heads off to South America to bring back an absconding financier whose extradition has been agreed. However the financier escapes custody, and the inspector gives chase.) |
| 4 | 1933 | Conspiracy | Hutchinson, London | 288 p., 8º | (Note: Thriller. A criminal gang of insurance arsonists attempt to murder Inspector Vallance, but they slip up and he tracks down the incendiary gang. This was very topical when published as a trial of such a gang had just taken place. A reviewer said: Mr Proudfoot's plot is out of the usual rut and makes the most of it. Conspiracy is a splendid thriller and should be immensely popular.) |

=== Writing as John Mowbray ===
The problem with the John Mowbray pseudonym is that it was also used by Gunby Hadath. John Mowbray were the given names of both Hadath's maternal grandfather Rev. John Mowbray Pearson (11 Feb 1809 – 19 July 1850), and a maternal uncle of the same name (fourth quarter of 1838 – ). Fourteen unique titles (Note: The term unique here refers to some titles having several versions in the catalogue.) under this name are listed in The British Library catalogue.

Kemp attributes all of the Mowbray novels to Vahey, but of the five crime stories, only one, Call in the Yard (1931) is now attributed to Vahey by Hubin in his updated Crime Fiction IV: A Comprehensive Bibliography 1749–2000. Edwards says Mowbray had been identified with Hadath until the British Museum (now Library) catalogue firmly declared Mowbray the pseudonym of one J. G. H. Vahey, with no additional proof. The British Library sometimes indicates pseudonymous authorship unequivocally, as in the case of Harry Collingwood where his books are listed in the catalogue as being authored by Collingwood, Harry, pseud. (i.e. William Joseph Cosens Lancaster.) In the case of John Mowbray, there is now no such unequivocal assignment, it is merely that the year of birth and death are the same as those of Vahey, with Mowbray listed as: Mowbray, John, 1881–1938. This contrasts with the treatment of Mowbray by the British Museum in 1963 where he is described as: Mowbray (John) pseud, (i.e. John George Haslette Vahey.) The British Library Catalogue also gives coincident birth and death dates for John Haslette, Vernon Loder, Henrietta Clandon, Anthony Lang, Walter Proudfoot, and Arthur N. Timony.

The evidence for Hadath's authorship of the books by John Mowbray is as follows:

- The Mowbray novels, with one exception, are all juvenile fiction, whereas all the books published by Vahey under his other pseudonyms, with two exceptions are adult thriller, crime novels and romances (and often combine all there). The only juvenile book definitively by Vahey was The New Zoo, an illustrated book of verse for younger children.
- The pseudonym, John Mowbray, like the other two pseudonyms which Hadath used for published books, can be found in his family tree.
- Some of the school novels by Mowbray share characters with novels by Hadath.
- Some of the Mowbray novels are situated near where Hadath spent his summers.
- The plots of the school novels are common (unjustly accused boys, initial conflict ending in friendship) etc. with many of Hadath's works. Kirkpatrick noted that the Mowbray school stories are similar to those written by Hadath
- Reviewers praise the same facets in Mowbray's school stories that they do in Hadath's, his realism.

Hubin's bibliography of crime fiction in 1984 listed five titles as being by Vahey, using the pseudonym John Mowbray. These were

- Call the Yard. Skeffington, 1931
- The Frontier Mystery. Collins, 1940
- The Megeve Mystery. Collins, 1941
- On Secret Service. Collins, 1939
- The Radio Mystery. Collins, 1941

A sixth title, The Way of the Weasel. Partridge, 1922 was listed as being a questionable inclusion.

Of these titles:

- Only one of these, Call in the Yard is an adult novel, and this is the only one now attributed to Vahey by Hubin in his updated Crime Fiction IV: A Comprehensive Bibliography 1749–2000. This attribution is correct as Vahey registered his copyright of this novel in the United States, as he generally did with his books.
- The next four titles were juvenile fiction, were all published after Vahey's death in 1938, and in most cases had plots centred on the Second World War, which began more than a year after Vahey had died.
- The Way of the Weasel is a public-school story about a boy nicknamed The Weasel.

Books written as John Mowbray – Vahey probably wrote Call in the Yard, Gunby Hadath, the remainder.
| No | Year | Title | Publisher | Pages | Notes |
|---|---|---|---|---|---|
| 1 | 1924 | The way of the Weasel | S.W. Partridge, London | 159 p., 1 ill., 8º | (Note: Juvenile fiction. Probably written by Gunby Hadath. A public-school story. "Weasel" is a boy of small stature, who finds his friend is the victim of a plot at school. He clears up the mystery and justice is done.) |
| 2 | 1925 | Something like a hero | Cassell & Co, London | 215 p., 8º | (Note: Juvenile fiction. Probably written by Gunby Hadath. Illustrated by H. M. Brock. A public-school story. In Cassell's New Boys' Library.) |
| 3 | 1925 | Barkworth's Last Year | Cassell & Co, London | 185 p., 8º | (Note: Juvenile fiction. Probably written by Gunby Hadath. A public-school story. In Cassell's Popular Library for Boys' and Girls. Barkworth is removed from school after an unjust accusation, but eventually recovers his place.) |
| 4 | 1926 | The Black Sheep of the School | Cassell & Co, London | 185 p., 8º | (Note: Juvenile fiction. Probably written by Gunby Hadath. A public-school story. In Cassell's New Boys' Library) |
| 5 | 1927 | Feversham's fag | Cassell & Co, London | 215 p., 8º | (Note: Juvenile fiction. Probably written by Gunby Hadath. A public-school story. In Cassell's New Boys' Library. Shares characters with The Fifth Feversham by Hadath.) |
| 6 | 1928 | Dismal Jimmy of the fourth | Cassell & Co, London | 215 p., 8º | (Note: Juvenile fiction. Probably written by Gunby Hadath. Illustrated by H. M. Brock. A public-school story. In Cassell's New Boys' Library) |
| 7 | 1929 | Feversham's brother | Cassell & Co, London | 215 p., 8º | (Note: Juvenile fiction. Probably written by Gunby Hadath. Illustrated by H. M. Brock. A public-school story. In Cassell's New Boys' Library. Shares characters with The Fifth Feversham by Hadath.) |
| 8 | 1930 | The feud at Fennell's | Cassell & Co, London | 215 p., 8º | (Note: Juvenile fiction. Probably written by Gunby Hadath. Illustrated by H. M. Brock. A public-school story. In Cassell's New Boys' Library. A feud breaks out between day-boys and boarders and two boys work hard to resolve matters.) |
| 9 | 1931 | The strongest chap in the school | Cassell & Co, London | 215 p., 8º | (Note: Juvenile fiction. Probably written by Gunby Hadath. Illustrated by H. M. Brock. A public-school story. In Cassell's New Boys' Library. A boy who has been tutored for years is suddenly sent to school, but object to compulsory games. He struggles with the school's all-rounder and they eventually become friends.) |
| 10 | 1931 | Call the Yard | Skeffington & Son, London | 256 p., 8º | (Note: Thriller (genre). The owners of 40 acres of waste land salt an old cave on the land with the gold coins to find a purchaser who expects to find buried treasure there. A party of scatter-brained young American men, and a confidence trickster who ends up being murdered.) |
| 11 | 1939 | On secret service | Cassell & Co, London | 303 p., 8º | (Note: Juvenile fiction. Probably written by Gunby Hadath. A boy recovers the stolen plans of a new and very secret British aircraft and flies home in the prototype that foreign agents have made from the drawings.) |
| 12 | 1940 | The frontier mystery | Cassell & Co, London | 256 p., 8º | (Note: Juvenile fiction. Probably written by Gunby Hadath. A spy tale set in a frontier town on the borders of France, Italy, and Switzerland. Saint-Gervais-les-Bains, where Hadath spent the summers, fits that description. This was one of four novels included in Collins' Omnibus of War Adventures (1941).) |
| 13 | 1941 | The radio mystery | Collins, London | 254 p., 8º | (Note: Juvenile fiction. Probably written by Gunby Hadath. A schoolboy is deceived by a Quisling, and is only undeceived in time to avoid handing a new secret weapon over to Hitler.) |
| 14 | 1941 | The Megève mystery | Cassell & Co, London | 256 p., 8º | (Note: Juvenile fiction. Probably written by Gunby Hadath. Megève is 4km from the village of Saint-Gervais-les-Bains which made Hadath an honorary citizen. This title was one of the three books in Collins's Second Omnibus of War Adventures (1942)) |

=== Writing as Henrietta Clandon ===
All of the Clandon novels were published by Geoffrey Bles who was known for his flair in discovering writing talent. This is another example of Vahey working with a single publisher for a particular pseudonym. The Clandon novels are all Whodunnits, although the last, and the last book published by Vahey, features spies. This was at the end of the 1930s when the world was inexorably moving towards war. This was something that could be seen across the pseudonyms, with more spy stories featuring in Vahey's output.

Books written as Henrietta Clandon
| No | Year | Title | Publisher | Pages | Notes |
|---|---|---|---|---|---|
| 1 | 1933 | Inquest | Geoffrey Bles, London | 285 p., 8º | (Note: Whodunnit. A widow reconvenes the group that were present six month earlier during the apparently accidental death of her husband to hold what amounts to an informal inquest. A new accidental death now marred proceedings and the police are called in, leading eventually to the solution. A reviewer said: Well interspersed with dialogue, this story reads very much like an interesting press report of cross-examinations at an important criminal trial.) |
| 2 | 1934 | The Ghost Party | Geoffrey Bles, London | 288 p., 8º | (Note: Whodunnit. A young author gets up a party from their hotel to spend the night in a supposedly haunted house. One of the party is killed and another is knocked unconscious. On returning to their hotel, they find an old lady has been murdered there. Inspector Grath, through his cleverness, solves the mystery.) |
| 3 | 1935 | Rope by Arrangement | Geoffrey Bles, London | 294 p., 8º | (Note: Whodunnit. The moral of the story is that the cobbler who deserts his last can face danger as a result. Features William Power, who appears in four of the Clandon novels, and the Mercers, Penny and Vincent, who appear if four not quite overlapping Clandon Novels.) |
| 4 | 1936 | Good By Stealth | Geoffrey Bles, London | 285 p., 8º | (Note: Whodunnit of a sort. The plot is centred on poison-pen letters in a small town. The book is unusual in that the narrator is none other than the poison-pen writer herself. Features William Power, who appears in four of the Clandon novels.) |
| 5 | 1936 | This Delicate Murder | Geoffrey Bles, London | 288 p., 8º | (Note: Whodunnit. The apparent accidental death of a popular but odious novelist at a shooting party is actually murder. Features William Power, who appears in four of the Clandon novels, and the Mercers, Penny and Vincent, who appear in four not quite overlapping Clandon Novels. One reviewer said: An excellent story with some character depiction, and not a little humor, but another would have liked: a lot less about the science of ballistics.) |
| 6 | 1937 | Power on the Scent | Geoffrey Bles, London | 287 p., 8º | (Note: Whodunnit. A murder in a nearby village brings the Mercers rushing in to solve the case, which they eventually do with the help of William Power, who appears in three Clandon novels alongside Penny and Vincent Mercer and once on his own. A reviewer wrote: one of the most readable books the author . . . has given us.) |
| 7 | 1938 | Fog off Weymouth | Geoffrey Bles, London | 284 p., 8º | (Note: A Whodunnit featuring spies and counter-spies. Caught in a fog while at sea, the Mercers are confronted by a puzzling mystery. Fortunately Chief Inspector Voce is there to help unravel things.Features the Mercers, Penny and Vincent, who appear in four of the Clandon Novels.) |

== Death and legacy ==
Vahey died on 15 June 1938. He was living at Flat 4, Reedley, Lindsay Road, Bournemouth, his widow was his executor and his estate was valued at just over £950. His widow survived him by a little more than 20 years, dying in Bournemouth on 6 November 1958, at 78 years of age.

Vahey published 59 books between 1925 and 1938, an average of over four a year. All but two of these were novels. He worked on edits, proofs, covers, rights, serialization etc. He also produced shorter fiction for newspapers and magazines. His work as Loder was of high quality, as the Collins Crime Club was selective. Similarly his writing as Henrietta Clandon was well regarded, and four of the Clandon books have now been reissued as e-books. Two of the Loder novels have been reissued by Collins.

Moss states that: Loder never quite achieved the first rank of detective novelists, and has received scant attention in commentaries of the genre. Nonetheless, he was a popular, dependable author in the 1930s, and better than many; perhaps a paradigm of the English Golden Age mystery writer. Kemp states that Vahey matured into a competent hack writer. In the reviews of his work phrases like competent, craftsman, and well-drawn character frequently appear. Vahey had remained out of print since the 1930s, but is now starting to return to print. Six of his novels are currently available as commercial e-books, and three more are on archival sites.

In the preface to the first Vernon Loder novel published, the editor of the Collins Detective Story Club wrote that: Mr Vernon Loder is one of the most promising recruits to the ranks of detective story writers . . . He certainly knows how to provide a mystery baffling enough to satisfy the most exacting reader. In 2018 Moss hoped that the reissue of some of the Loder books would help Vahey to be: rediscovered and enjoyed by a new wider readership.
