= Digital Systems =

Technology development company

Digital Systems Inc. was an American accounting service and technology development company active between 1966 and 1979.

== History ==
It was founded by John Q. Torode in Seattle, Washington. The company was reorganized into the microcomputer design and development company Digital Microsystems, Inc. (DMS), Oakland, USA, founded in 1979.

In 1984, it was sold to the new UK operation Digital Microsystems Ltd. (DML) (owned by Extel Group Plc) and finally ended its US operations in 1986. Without Torode, Digital Microsystems Ltd.'s product HiNet (Hierarchical Integration Network) was sold to Apricot Computers Plc in 1987.

In 1986, Torode founded a new company, IC Designs, Inc., based partly on Theodore "Ted" H. Kehl's VLSI technology at the University of Washington (UW), which was bought by Cypress Semiconductor Corp. in 1993.
