= Blue Guides =

Travel guidebook series

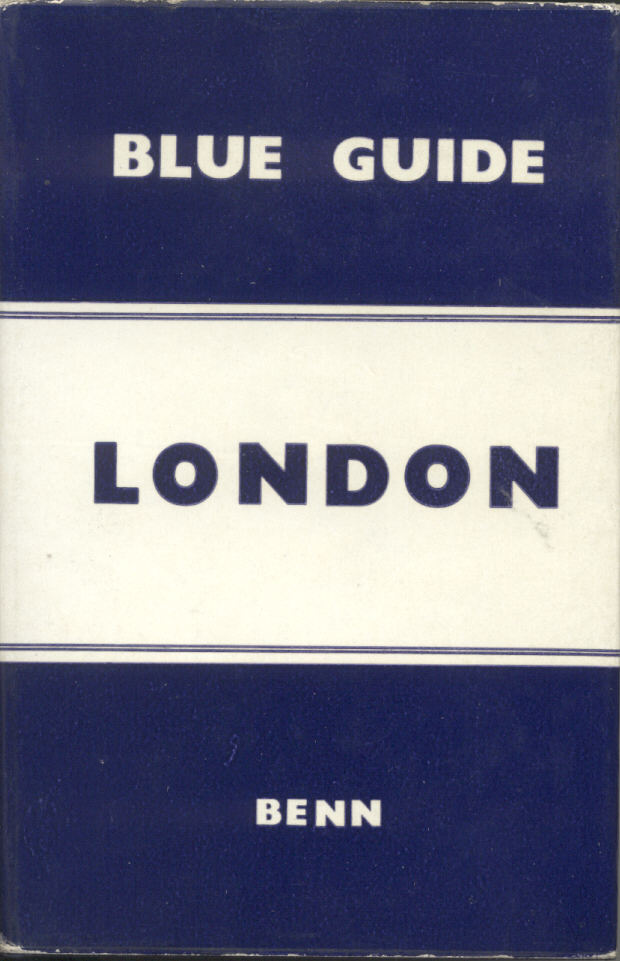
- The 9th edition of Blue Guide London (1965)
- Parent company: Somerset Books
- Founded: 1918
- Founders: James and Findlay Muirhead
- Country of origin: United Kingdom
- Headquarters location: London
- Distribution: Bertrams (UK); W. W. Norton & Company (US); Penguin Books (India)
- Publication types: Books
- Nonfiction topics: Travel guides
- Official website: www.blueguides.com

The Blue Guides are a series of detailed travel guidebooks focused on art, architecture, and (where relevant) archaeology along with the history and context necessary to understand them. A modicum of practical travel information, with recommended restaurants and hotels, is also generally included.

The first Blue Guide – London and its Environs – was published in 1918 by the Scottish brothers James and Findlay Muirhead. The Muirheads had for many years been the English-language editors of the famous German Baedeker series. When they also acquired the rights to John Murray III’s famous travel “handbooks” they established the Blue Guides as heir to the great 19th century guide book tradition.

== History ==
=== Precursors ===
In 1828, Karl Baedeker (1801–59) published his first guidebook, Rheinreise von Mainz bis Cöln and in 1836 John Murray III’s (1808–92) first Handbook was released (Handbook for Travellers on the Continent). The first Baedeker in English, The Rhine (1861), was published jointly by Baedeker and Murray. These handbooks were to become the standard for English travellers for the remainder of the 19th Century.

James Muirhead (1853–1934) began working for Baedeker in 1878, preparing a Handbook for Travellers to London. Findlay Muirhead (1860–1935), graduate of the University of Edinburgh, left his studies at Leipzig in 1887 to join his brother at Baedeker. For almost the next 30 years the brothers were responsible for all English language Baedekers, including compiling guides to Britain, the US and Canada. Following the outbreak of World War I, the Muirhead brothers found themselves out of a job. They acquired the rights to Murray’s Handbooks in 1915 from the cartographical publisher Edward Stanford, who had bought them 14 years earlier from John Murray IV. In the same year they established their company, Muirhead’s Guide-books Limited.

=== The Blue Guides and the Guides Bleu ===
A 1917 agreement with French publisher Hachette allowed co-publication in English and French of guidebooks under the names Blue Guides and Guides Bleus, respectively. Hachette’s existing Guides Joannes had blue covers, while Baedeker’s guides had red covers. The first Blue Guide, Blue Guide London and its Environs, was published in 1918. Two years later, Hachette published Guide Bleu Londres et ses Environs. The Hachette relationship with the Blue Guides ended in 1933.

=== 1931-82 ===
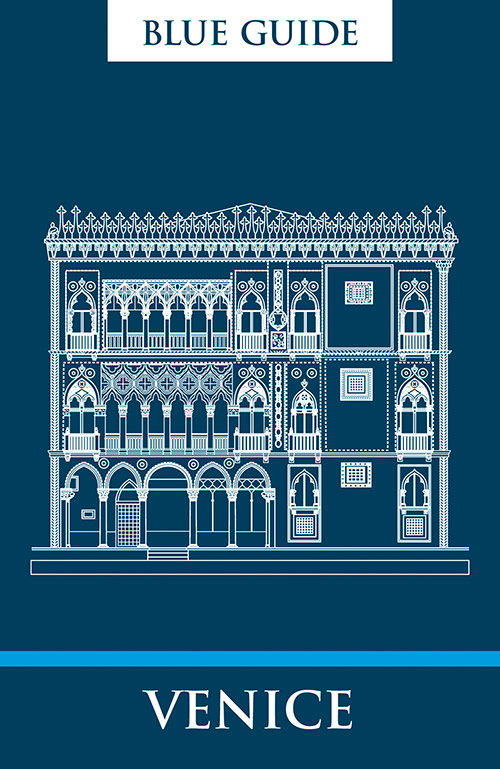
The 10th edition of Blue Guide Venice (2023)

The Blue Guides were acquired by Ernest Benn Limited in 1931. (Litellus) Russell Muirhead (1896-1976), Findlay’s son, became the series editor in 1934. He retired in 1963, remaining a consulting editor until 1965 when the Muirhead family’s connection with the series ended.

In 1963, Stuart Rossiter (1923-82) was appointed editor and in 1967 the first of Rossiter’s “scrupulously edited guides, compiled for the independent educated traveller wanting to avoid the monotony of international uniformity” (Blue Guide Greece) was compiled by Rossiter himself and published. Blue Guide Rome and Environs, by Alta Macadam, was released in 1971. Her Italy titles thereafter become some of the best selling Blue Guides and included Sicily (1975), Northern Italy (1978), Florence (1982), Venice (1980), Tuscany (1993), and Umbria (1993), all frequently updated and re-issued. Other key Blue Guide authors are and have been Ian Robertson (Spain, Portugal, Ireland, Austria, Switzerland, Cyprus, France, & Paris and Versailles), John Tomes (Scotland, Wales), Ian Ousby (England), Paul Blanchard (Italy).

=== 1982 to present ===
In 1982, W.W. Norton of New York became the United States co-publisher, selling all Blue Guides in that country. Two years later, the Blue Guides were acquired by A&C Black (Publishers) Limited, themselves later acquired by Bloomsbury Publishing Plc. In 2004, Somerset Books, a small, London-based, family-owned travel publisher known for its Visible Cities guides, acquired the Blue Guides. A year later, they published the first new title under the new ownership, Blue Guide Northern Italy.
