= Geoffrey Roberts =

British historian (born 1952)

- Born: 1952 (age 73–74); Deptford, London, England

Academic background
- Education: London School of Economics
- Doctoral advisor: Geoffrey Stern

Academic work
- Discipline: Soviet history
- Sub-discipline: Soviet military and foreign policy
- Institutions: University College Cork
- Main interests: Cold War, history of the social sciences, international relations, Irish history (modern), philosophy of history, Russian history, Soviet history, World War II
- Notable works: Stalin's Wars: From World War to Cold War, 1939–1953 (2006)
- Website: https://www.geoffreyroberts.net/

Geoffrey Charles Roberts (born 1952) is a British historian specialising in Soviet diplomatic and military history of World War II. He is an emeritus professor of modern history at University College Cork (UCC) in Ireland.

== Early life and education ==
Roberts was born into a working class family in Deptford, south London, in 1952. He completed four O-level examinations at the Addey and Stanhope Grammar School by 1968 and left to work as a clerk at the Greater London Council while attending evening classes. He joined the Communist Party of Great Britain's Young Communist League in 1969 and worked with Alastair Montague "Monty" Johnstone (1928–2007) in its Trotskyism Study Group. During the 1970s, he studied international relations at the North Staffordshire Polytechnic (switching from sociology after his first year), where he was influenced by the historian of Poland John Coutouvidis. He pursued graduate research in this field at the London School of Economics under the supervision of Geoffrey Stern. In the late 1970s and early 1980s, he worked with Barry Hindess and Paul Hirst on their Politics & Power series of publications, and credits Hirst for the inspiration to embrace R. G. Collingwood's philosophy of history. He stood as a CPGB candidate in the 1982 local elections and the 1983 general election.

== Career ==
During the 1980s, he worked full-time at the Education Department of the National and Local Government Officers' Association trade union. In 1987, on the advice of Stern, he decided to publish his postgraduate research as a book before submitting it as a thesis, He left the Communist Party in 1988. andThe Unholy Alliance: Stalin's Pact with Hitler with I.B. Tauris appeared in 1989. The dissertation based on it was examined some years later by John Erickson and Philip Windsor.

In 1992, Roberts took up an academic position at the University College Cork, where he taught history and international relations. He worked and did research in the archives of the Russian Ministry of Foreign Affairs from November 1996 onward.

He became a fellow of the Royal Historical Society in 1997. He was a visiting scholar at the Kennan Institute in Washington, D.C. in 2001 and again in 2007, as well as a Government of Ireland Senior Research Fellow in 2004–2005.

Roberts was promoted to Professor of History at UCC in 2005. He was a Fulbright Scholar at Harvard University in the same year and a senior research fellow at the Norwegian Nobel Institute in Oslo in 2008. He served as Head of UCC's School of History from 2009 to 2014, then as Deputy Registrar and Dean of Graduate Studies in 2017–2018.

A commentator on history and current affairs, Roberts has been a regular speaker in Britain, Ireland, Russia, and the United States, and a contributor to the History News Service. Between 2011 and 2014 he was an opinion writer for the Irish Examiner. He has appeared on radio and television and has acted as an historical consultant for documentary series such as Simon Berthon's Warlords, broadcast in 2005 on Channel 4.

In 2013, the Society for Military History awarded the Distinguished Book Award to his Stalin's General: The Life of Georgy Zhukov (2012), a work which Jonathan Yardley for The Washington Post described as "what is likely to stand for some time as the most comprehensive biography of Zhukov."

In 2015, Roberts' Stalin's Wars: From World War to Cold War, 1939–1953, (Note: Roberts described it as a "highly partisan book" that argues Joseph Stalin was "a very effective war leader who played a decisive role in the defeat of Hitler." and added, "It is also a work of scholarship that is based on all the available evidence and careful weighing of different arguments. It has been extensively reviewed but not even its worst critics have questioned its scholarly integrity.") which was first published in 2006 by Yale University Press, would not be stocked by the Sorbonne University's library because of its alleged lack of neutrality (Note: The university responded to the request to include the tome in its library: "The proposed work, although it was written by a university professor, does not in principle seem to us to display the historical and scientific neutrality required for it to be included on our shelves. Nor do the other books published by the same publishing house." The French translation of the book was published by Éditions Delga, which describes itself as "a publishing house specialising in the humanities engaged in the defence of public cultural service, Marxist research and history of the international communist movement.") after an online petition (Note: The online petition, "submitted under the names of Godefroy Clair, Research Engineer at Université Paris 8, Annie Lacroix-Riz, Professor Emeritus of contemporary history at Université Paris 7 and Aymeric Monville, editor-in-chief, Éditions Delga" according to the Irish Examiner, saw the refusal as part of a wider "McCarthyist censorship" in French universities.) asked the university to stock the French version of the work. Roberts was surprised by it, and commented, "It's never happened before. It's a work of scholarship. It has some very strong opinions, not everyone agrees with it, but to characterise it the way they've characterised it is completely wrong. ... There can be no reason for an academic library to prohibit the purchase of Les Guerres de Staline, except political prejudice. ... Not even [the book's] worst critics have questioned its scholarly integrity."

Roberts was elected a Member of the Royal Irish Academy in March 2016.

== Views ==
In an interview with George Mason University's History News Network following the publication of Stalin's General: The Life of Georgy Zhukov, Roberts said: "As I argued in Stalin's Wars and again in Stalin's General, it was (ironically) Stalin and the Soviets who helped saved [sic] liberal democracy, as well as the communist system, from the Nazis."

About the Soviet Union, of which he was a critic in his youth, he commented "I retain the liberal and democratic ethos that informed my critique of Soviet authoritarianism." Roberts stated that it was "responsible for some of the most epic achievements and most gross misdeeds of our age" and said he had "no difficulty in joining the condemnation of the Soviet system's violence, terror and repression."

Roberts said he was "a great admirer of much of [Timothy D.] Snyder's work" and commended Bloodlands for telling "an important part of the story, but I don't see it as the whole picture." Expressing disagreement with Snyder's equating Nazi Germany with the Soviet Union, Roberts commented, "It's a pity Snyder's work has become associated with the recent revival of Cold War ideological polemics in which Hitler and Stalin and the Soviet and Nazi systems are depicted as being equivalent and as bad as each other."

== Reception ==
In a review for Stalin's Wars: From World War to Cold War, 1939–1953, the history professor Jonathan Haslam wrote that Cold War politics and historical revisionism "caused historians to emphasize Stalin's ruthlessness and paranoia while downplaying his contribution to the war effort." Roberts posited that "the contemporaneous view of Stalin as a great war leader was largely justified. Without minimizing Stalin's mistakes or his paranoia, the author maintains that the dictator was a key factor in the Soviet victory."

Roberts also wrote: "Without him the efforts of the [Communist] party, the people, the armed forces and their generals would have been considerably less effective."

In a 1996 article for The Journal of Modern History, Haslam criticized Roberts for relying too heavily on edited Soviet archival documents and for going too far in his conclusions, positing that this made his accounts somewhat one sided and by no means telling a full story.

In a review about the same work for The National Interest, the historian Andrew Bacevich described it as "a model of scholarship" but criticized the depiction of Stalin "as great statesman and man of peace" and posited that Roberts was being overly sympathetic towards Stalin, taking the word of the Soviet leadership uncritically in his writings, presenting a biased view, and significantly undermining the usefulness of his scholarship. Roberts described Stalin as "the dictator who defeated Hitler and helped save the world for democracy."

== Published works ==
- Roberts, Geoffrey (1989). The Unholy Alliance: Stalin's Pact with Hitler (hardcover ed.). Bloomington, Indiana: Indiana University Press. ISBN 9780253351173. See also the 1990 edition via Internet Archive.
- Roberts, Geoffrey (1995). The Soviet Union and the Origins of the Second World War (hardcover 1st ed.). London, England: Palgrave Macmillan. ISBN 9780312126032.
- Roberts, Geoffrey (1999). The Soviet Union in World Politics, 1945–1991 (hardcover ed.). London, England: Routledge. ISBN 9780415192460.
- Roberts, Geoffrey (2002). Victory at Stalingrad: The Battle That Changed History (illustrated 1st ed.). Longman. ISBN 9780582771857.
- Roberts, Geoffrey (2006). Stalin's Wars: From World War to Cold War, 1939–1953 (hardcover ed.). New Haven, Connecticut: Yale University Press. ISBN 9780300112047.
- Roberts, Geoffrey (2012). Molotov: Stalin's Cold Warrior (hardcover ed.). Washington, D.C.: Potomac Books. ISBN 9781574889451.
- Roberts, Geoffrey (2012). Stalin's General: The Life of Georgy Zhukov (hardcover ed.). New York City, New York: Random House. ISBN 9781400066926.
- Roberts, Geoffrey, ed. (2013). Marshal of Victory: The Autobiography of General Georgy Zhukov. Vol. 1–2 (hardback ed.). Barnsley: Pen and Sword. ISBN 9781781592915.
- Roberts, Geoffrey (2014). "Averting Armageddon: The Communist Peace Movement, 1948–1956". In Smith, Stephen A. (ed.). The Oxford Handbook of the History of Communism (hardcover ed.). Oxford, England: Oxford University Press. pp. 322–338. doi:10.1093/oxfordhb/9780199602056.013.018. ISBN 9780199602056.
- Folly, Martin H.; Roberts, Geoffrey; Rzheshevsky, Oleg Alexandrovich (2020). Churchill and Stalin: Comrades-in-Arms during the Second World War (hardcover ed.). Barnsley, England: Pen & Sword Military. ISBN 9781781590492.
- Roberts, Geoffrey (2022). Stalin's Library: A Dictator and his Books (PDF). New Haven, Connecticut: Yale University Press. ISBN 9780300179040. Archived (PDF) from the original on 9 January 2023.
- Roberts, Geoffrey (2026). Wartime Letters: London and Moscow 1941-1945 (hardcover 1st ed.). Yale University Press. ISBN 9780300278545.
