= Sixpenny Library =

Series of reference books

Ernest Benn Limited’s Sixpenny Library is a complete series of reference books published in the late 1920s and early 1930s. The library included over one hundred and eighty volumes. The series was edited by William Rose, who solicited current authorities in such areas as history, literature, religion, psychology, science, and economics. Some contributing authors were Hilaire Belloc, Maurice Baring, J.B. Priestley, Sir (later Lord) Robert Baden-Powell, Sir Oliver Lodge, S.V. Keeling and Sir Ernest Benn himself. The Spectator, in November 1927, after announcing some of the latest additions to "Messrs Benn's excellent Sixpenny Library" devoted a further paragraph to his contribution on Trade (both of which are free to read online). Partial lists of the books published in the series can be found here and here.

The books were praised by critics for their excellence, brevity, and inexpensive price.
