= Ernest Benn Limited =

British publishing house

- Status: Defunct
- Founded: 1880
- Founder: Sir John Benn
- Defunct: 1987
- Successor: Extel
- Country of origin: United Kingdom
- Publication types: Books, magazines

Ernest Benn Limited was a British publishing house.

== Sir John Benn ==
Founded by Sir John Benn as Benn Brothers in 1880, it started as the publisher of the trade journal, The Cabinet Maker.

== Ernest Benn ==
After Sir John was elected to Parliament in 1892, he passed control of the firm to his eldest son Ernest, who became managing director and started publishing more trade journals, such as Gas World, the Fruit Grower and the Electrician, as well as "technical books for each specialized public". In 1923, Ernest changed the name of the firm to Ernest Benn Limited. However, the name 'Benn Brothers' was subsequently revived with the formation of Benn Brothers plc.

Benn hired Victor Gollancz in 1921. Gollancz published a very successful series of art books. He later recruited the writers Edith Nesbit, Robert W. Service and H. G. Wells.

Thanks to Gollancz's gifts as a publisher, the company's turnover increased 100-fold in seven years. But Benn was unwilling to cede control of the company to him. Moreover, Benn had moved to the political right and Gollancz to the left. Gollancz left the firm in 1927 to form his own firm, Victor Gollancz Limited.

The firm published a number of books for children and young people, including The Story of the Amulet (1927) by E. Nesbit, Moominsummer Madness (1955) by Tove Jansson, Donkey Days (1977) by Helen Cresswell, and Sybil and the Blue Rabbit (1979) by Jane Johnson.

== Book series ==
In addition to individual books, Ernest Benn Limited was known for a number of series:

- Affirmations: God in the Modern World
- The American Library
- Benn's Augustan Books of Poetry
- Benn's Essex Library
- Benn's Fishing Handbooks
- Benn's Twentieth Century Histories
- Benn's World Histories
- Benn's Yellow Books
- The Blue Guides – travel guides (previously published by Muirhead)
- The Bouverie Library
- Chats Series: Practical Handbooks for Collectors (originally published as Unwin's Chat Series)
- Chemical Engineering Library
- Contemporary British Artists
- Contemporary British Dramatists
- Curiosities of Politics
- Drawings of the Great Masters
- A History of Seafaring
- A History of the English People in the Nineteenth Century
- Inner Ring Books
- Inner Ring Hipsters
- Instruments of the Orchestra (jointly published with W. W. Norton & Company, New York)
- Kai Khosru Monographs on Eastern Art (jointly published with Frederick A. Stokes Co., New York)
- Leaders of Philosophy
- A Literary History of Spain (jointly published with Barnes & Noble)
- The Little Library
- Mermaid Critical Commentaries
- Mermaid Series – reprints of English Elizabethan, Jacobean and Restoration plays
- Modern Finance Series
- The Modern Knowledge Library
- The Modern World: A Survey of Historical Forces
- Nations of the Modern World (jointly published with Frederick A. Praeger, Inc.)
- The New Mermaids – new version of Benn's Mermaid Series
- New Ninepenny Novels
- Oil & Colour Chemistry Monographs (jointly published with D. Van Nostrand Company, New York)
- The Players' Shakespeare
- The Resources of the Empire Series
- Self and Society Booklets
- Sixpenny Library – early paperback educational series
- Sixpenny Poets
- Stead's Poets, begun by W. T. Stead in 1895 and re-issued by Benn from ?–1926
- Stories of the Commonwealth Series
- Tolley Tax Guides
- Trout and Salmon Books
- University College, London: Monographs on English Mediæval Art

== 1980s ==
Ernest Benn Ltd, along with Benn Brothers plc and the other members of the Benn Group of Companies, was taken over by the Extel Group in June 1983. Extel was taken over by United Newspapers in 1987.
