= Mermaid Series =

Editions of classic English plays

The Mermaid Series was a major collection of reprints of texts from English Elizabethan, Jacobean and Restoration drama. It was launched in 1887 by the British publisher Henry Vizetelly and under the general editorship of Havelock Ellis. Around 1894 the series was taken over by the London firm of T. Fisher Unwin. Many well-known literary figures edited or introduced the texts. Some of the plays published had not been reprinted in recent editions, and most had dropped out of the stage repertoire.

The name alludes to the Mermaid Tavern in London. There has been a later New Mermaids Series.
