= Tiffany Stern =

Tiffany Stern FBA (b. 1968) is a historian and Shakespeare scholar. She is Professor of Shakespeare and Early Modern Drama at The Shakespeare Institute, University of Birmingham.

== Biography ==
Stern has a bachelor's degree in English from Merton College, Oxford. She gained her MPhil in 1993 and PhD in 1997, both from Emmanuel College, Cambridge. She was a Junior Research Fellow at Merton College, Oxford (1997-2000); a Reader at Oxford Brookes University (2001-5), and then Beaverbrook and Bouverie Fellow and Tutor at University College, Oxford, and Professor of Shakespeare and Early Modern Drama at the University of Oxford (2005–16). After a year as Shakespeare Chair at Royal Holloway, she became Professorial Fellow in Shakespeare and Early Modern Drama at The Shakespeare Institute, University of Birmingham in 2017. She is general editor of the New Mermaids series with William C. Carroll; Arden Shakespeare: 4 with Peter Holland and Zachary Lesser; and Norton Anthology of Sixteenth Century Literature, with Stephen Greenblatt.

Stern was elected as a Fellow of the British Academy in 2019.

== Select publications ==
- Stern, T. (ed) 2019. Rethinking Theatrical Documents in Shakespeare’s England.
- Karim-Cooper, F. and Stern, T. (eds) 2013. Shakespeare's Theatres and the Effects of Performance.
- Stern, T. 2012. Documents of Performance in Early Modern England. CUP.
- Stern, T. and Palfrey, S. 2007. 'Shakespeare in Parts'. OUP.
- Stern, T. 2004. Making Shakespeare. Routledge.
- Stern, T. 2000. 'Rehearsal from Shakespeare to Sheridan'. OUP.
