= James Fullarton Muirhead =

Scottish editor and writer of travel guides

James Fullarton Muirhead (1853-1934) was a Scottish editor and writer of travel guides, associated with the Baedeker publishing house for many years, prior to starting his own publishing house.

== History ==
James Fullarton Muirhead was born in Glasgow, Scotland, in 1853. He was educated at the Craigmount School in Edinburgh and at the University of Edinburgh, where he obtained a doctorate. Following graduation in 1876, he spent three years at Chambers's Encyclopaedia. Muirhead thereafter commenced a thirty-five year association (1879-1914) with the Baedeker publishing house, where he was the editor of the English and American editions of Baedeker's Handbook for Travellers, as well as writing separate guides based on Muirhead's own travels. Muirhead's guides based on his personal travels included guides to the United States, England and Canada. It was emphasized in the guides based on his own travels, such as the guides to the United States and Canada, that Muirhead had "personally visited the greater part of the districts described". For example, Muirhead spent three years travelling the United States, from 1890 to 1893, to obtain the information for his travel guide of that country. He also used his American travels to write A Land of Contrasts, published in 1898, in addition to his work on the related Baedeker guidebook.

Muirhead also translated poetry and wrote for the Encyclopædia Britannica.

Muirhead's association with Baedeker, a company long established and based in Germany, ended with the outbreak of the First World War. He thereafter assisted his brother Findlay in the development of the Blue Guides. Both brothers had been longtime associates of Baedeker. In 1915, they acquired the rights to Murray's Handbooks for Travellers, which formed the basis for the development of the Blue Guides.
