= Gunby Hadath =

English writer, songwriter, and lawyer (1871–1954)

John Edward Gunby Hadath
- Born: 30 April 1871; Owersby, Lincolnshire, England
- Died: 17 January 1954 (aged 82); Willesden, Middlesex, England
- Other names: Gunby Hadath, Florence Gunby Hadath, John Mowbray, Felix O'Grady, James Duncan, Shepherd/Shepperd Pearson
- Occupations: Schoolmaster; company promoter; journalist; song-writer; lawyer; author
- Years active: 1892–1954
- Known for: English Boarding School Stories
- Notable work: Sparrow in search of expulsion

John Edward Gunby Hadath MA FRSA (30 April 1871 – 17 January 1954) was an English schoolmaster, lawyer, company promoter, songwriter, journalist, and author of boarding school stories. He is best remembered for over seventy novels (almost all juvenile fiction) of which over two-thirds were set in English Public Schools. For example, The House that Disappeared, Schoolboy Grit, and, Conquering Claybury

== Early life ==
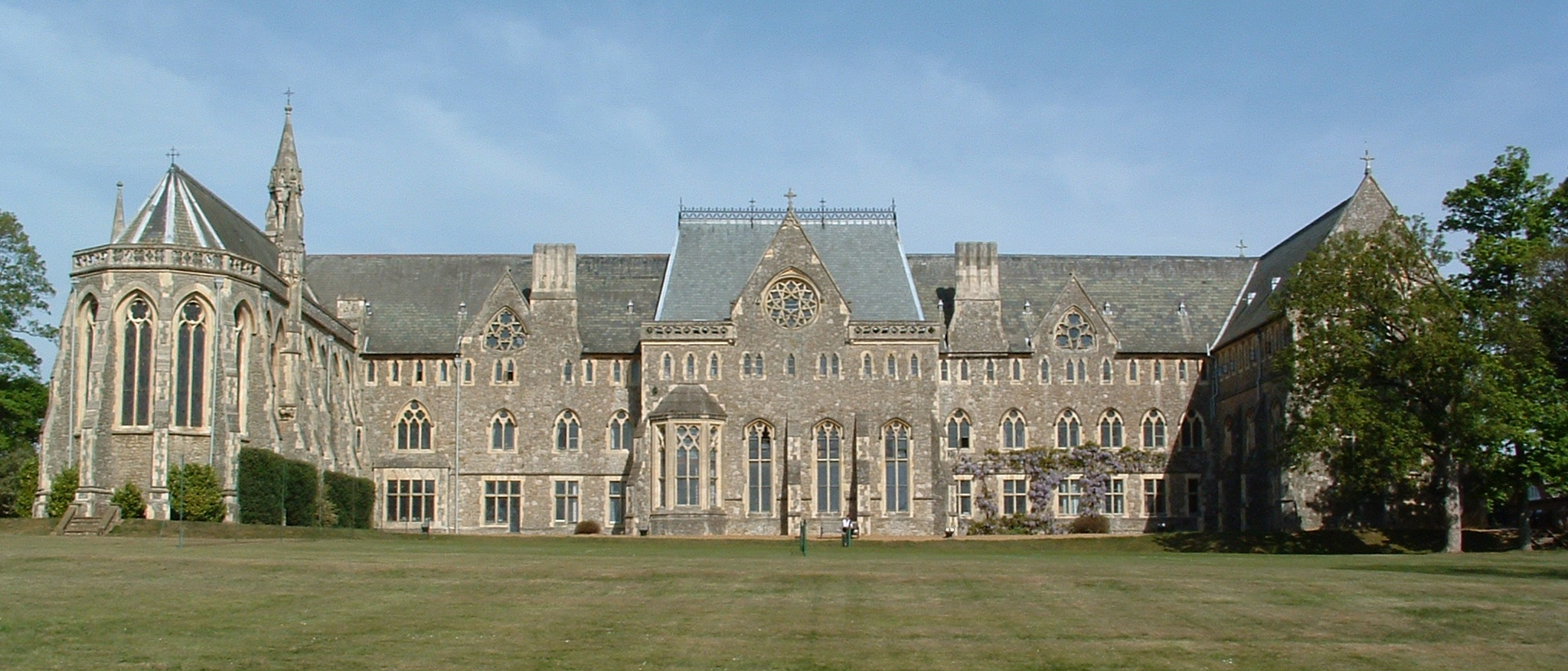
St Edmund's School, Canterbury, then the Clergy Orphan School, which Hadath attended.

Hadath was born at the Rectory in Owersby, Lincolnshire, England, on 30 April 1871, the only son (Note: He had three older sisters: Charlotte Elizabeth (1864–1945), a missionary who married in India and eventually emigrated to the United States, Maria Julia (1865–1881), who died when a teenager, and Mary Mowbray (1869–1891), who died in her early twenties.) of Reverend Edward Evans Hadath MA (c. 1892 – 19 Nov 1873), the Rector of Owersby and Charlotte Elizabeth (first quarter of 1840 – 27 April 1912), the eldest daughter of Rev. John Mobray Pearson (11 February 1809 – third quarter of 1850), a Wesleyan Minister.

Hadath's father died when he is two, and after initially attending a Dame school, he was sent to the Clergy Orphan School at St Thomas Hill in Canterbury, where the 1881 census found him registered as a scholar. He was athletic, and like the hero of one of his own school stories, was Captain of the school. He matriculated for Cambridge in October 1889 and was admitted as a resident student to Peterhouse College on 2 October 1889. At Cambridge, he continuing his sporting career and earned his college colours for rugby, football, and cricket. He was awarded his BA in 1892, and began a career as a schoolmaster.

== Early career ==
On leaving Cambridge Hadath taught first at Montpellier School in Paignton. This Private or Preparatory School had just been acquired by Bertram Bennet MA FRSA (18 April 1864 – 21 March 1925), who was a few years ahead of Hadath at Peterhouse. Bertram was another athlete. By 1894 the school was advertising Hadath as the Second Master, after the Head Master. (Note: The reason for advertising that Hadath was a master, was that while Bennett had a mathematics degree, excellent for those who wanted their children to try for the Navy or the Army, parents interested in sending their sons to Public Schools would be keen on a teacher of the classics, which was Hadath's degree. The advertisements for the school stated the specialisms of the two masters.) In 1894 also, Hadath was advertising for private pupils, so he cannot have been content with his salary. It is not clear how many years Hadath remained teaching here, but no advertisements referring to him can be found after 1895.

== Branching out ==
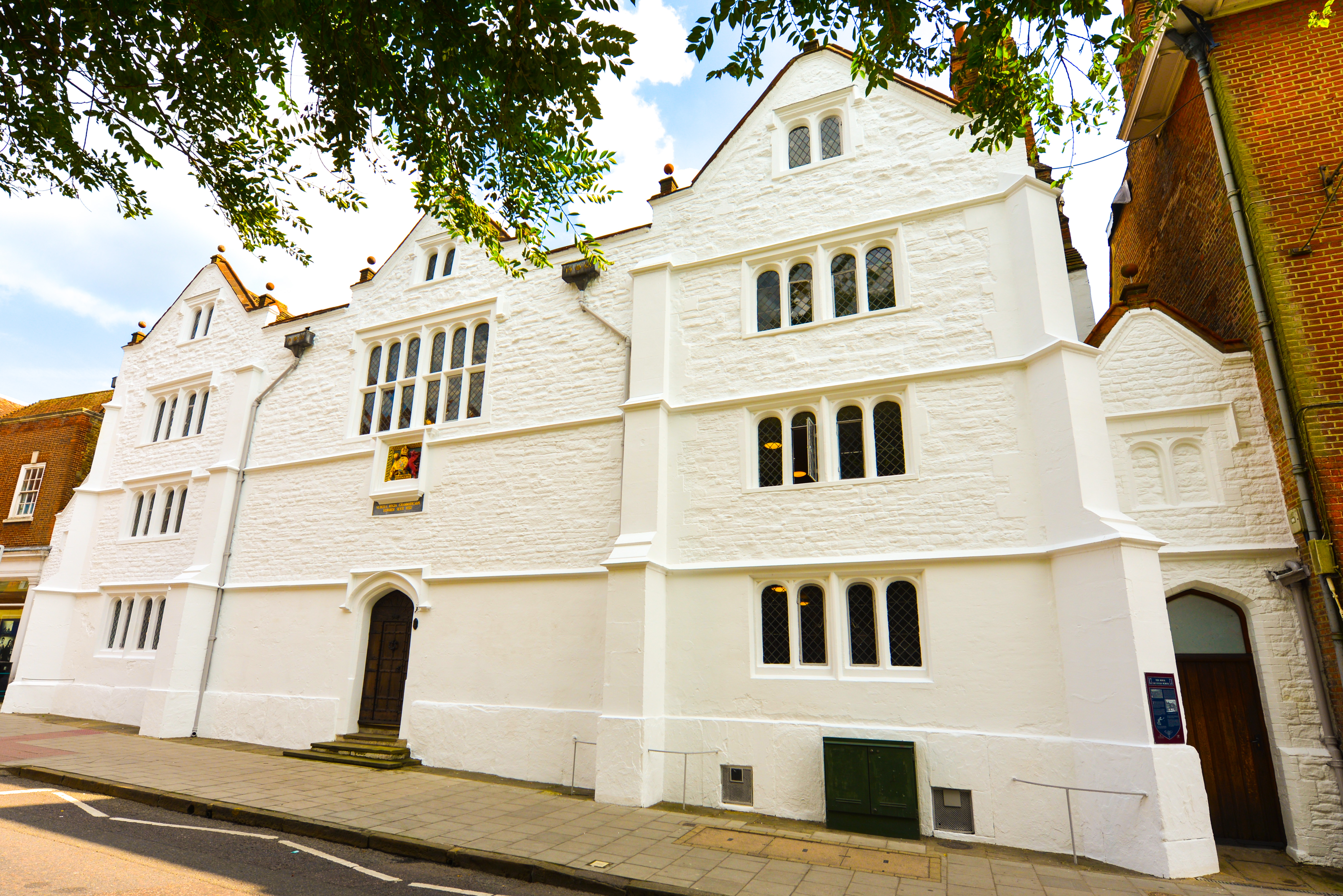
Guildford Grammar School, where Hadath was the Head of Classics.

Hadath was awarded his MA degree in January 1896 and was the Senior Classics Master at Guildford Grammar-School (Note: This is a Grammar School based at Guildford, Surrey in England, and not the Western Australian school of this name.) He continued to play sports, especially cricket.

Hadath married Florence Annie Webber (9 January 1873 – 23 January 1960) in Tonbridge in the third quarter of 1898. The couple never had any children. Florence was one of the few people who could read Hadath's awful handwriting and she used to type his stories for submission. Florence's twin sister Ella Maud was living with them in 1939. She had been the Matron (Note: A Boarding School Matron has the usual duties of a school nurse, but is also responsible for settling in new young boys, as well as overseeing the overall health of the children. A large school would typically have a few in-patient beds for any that needed more careful attention.) at Dulwich School for many years. By 18 August 1900 the Hadaths were living at what would be their long-term address of 39 Chichele Road, Cricklewood, North London. It was still his address when he died. As well as the Cricklewood Address, Hadeth also had a Chalet at Saint-Gervais-les-Bains, in the French Alps, near the Haute Savoie and Mont Blanc. He was a member of the Alpine Club of France. He was made a Citoyen d’Honneur of the town in 1932.

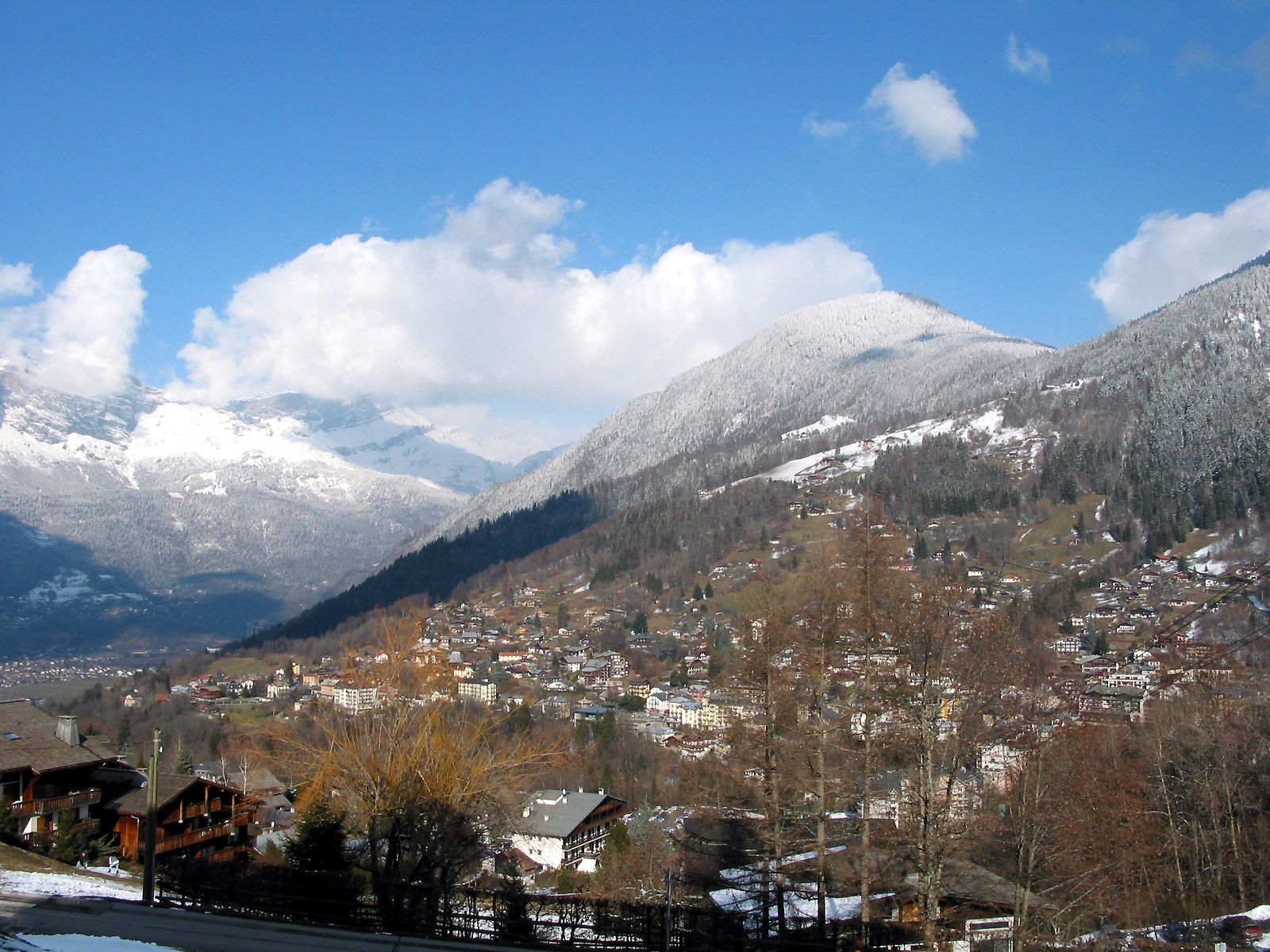
Saint-Gervais-les-Bains in 2004

Hadath was a keen sportsman. He was in the school and college teams at St Edmund's and Peterhouse. After leaving school, he played Rugby as an amateur, but injury stopped him from playing for his county. Florence was also a keen sportswoman. The Times reported that she collected holes in the most merciless fashion when playing on the Legal Association team in 1920.

It is not known when Hadath ceased teaching, but by 1902 he had already a good income from song-writing, having had more than 100 songs published. (Note: The British Library Catalogue lists 91 scores written by Hadath.)Hadath was also working for a number of companies. In 1897, Hadath was appointed liquidator for the Candelaria Gold Mine Limited, a liquidation that was only completed in 1902. Hadeth was listed as company secretary for two copper mines in 1903, The Copaquire Copper Sulphate Co. Ltd, with a mine in Copaquire, Tarapaca, Chile, and the Chile Copper Sulphate Syndicate, Ltd. which was leasing the lands to the first company. In 1907 he was the Company Secretary of British Coalite. 1909 found him company secretary to Sierra Morena Copper Mines Ltd, with an idle copper mine in Penaflor, Seville, Spain. Hadath was admitted to the Inner Temple on 20 February 1908.

Between 1896 and 1910, Hadath earned between £1,300 and £1,400 from his songwriting. However, his losses from speculations on the stock exchange exceeded this. He lost nearly £2,000 on the stock market and he was declared bankrupt on 19 January 1910. He had an initial hearing in February 1910, in which he declared that he had been a schoolmaster, a secretary of more than one company, a journalist and songwriter.

At a subsequent hearing on 28 July 1910, the Official Receiver reported that Hadath's bankruptcy had been brought on by rash and hazardous speculations. Because of this, the Registrar suspended the discharge for two years, and Hadath's discharge was to date from 28 July 1912.

Hadath joined up in the First World War and served in the 6th Battalion of the Middlesex Volunteer Regiment. This was a reserve battalion and was in Mill Hill in North London when war broke out, and were almost immediately sent to Gillingham in Kent. In November 1915, the Battalion was sent to nearby Chatham where he remained for the rest of the war., acting as a First-Class Light Guns instructor at Hythe, in Kent, England. Hadath was appointed to the Rank of Captain (Temporary) on 2 February 1917. He resigned his commission due to ill-health on 2 December 1918.

== Later life ==
After the war, Hadath began coaching pupils for the bar exam. He continued writing, and published right up to his death. Hadath was the director and co-trustee of the Benevolent Fund of the Performing Right Society. His first essay into such work was his appeal for the destitute family of the Italian song composer Piccolomini in the Musical Times of 1 August 1900. Hadath was made a Fellow of the Royal Society of the Arts,

Hadath died in a London Hospital on 17 January 1954. Florence survived him another six years, until 1960.

Hadath has attracted a lot of praise for his writing:

- Hadath became famous for his authentic and true-to-life school stories.
- . . . his name became one of the best known and best loved of those who aim to instruct as well as entertain youth
- His articulate and highly intelligent (as well as often very funny) school stories often spotlighted real-life social problems.
- Sports, humor, and loyalty play an important role in his sixty novels
- . . . he has been a schoolmaster, and is a schoolboy at heart still. He has the atmosphere of the public school. Boys know it and revel in it.
- It is a pleasant surprise to find an old favourite still writing, and still writing well.

But not everyone shared such high regard for Gunby: In New Zealand Dorothy Neal White, children's librarian at Dunedin, began in 1937 to organize the steady withdrawal from her shelves of books by writers judged second-rate, e.g. Percy Westerman, Elinor Brent-Dyer, and Gunby Hadath.

Hadath himself identified one of the problems facing his work. Juvenile fiction was a poor relation of other literature. It attracted far less attention than adult fiction, and far less monetary reward. There is undoubtedly an impression too many quarters that anybody can write books for young people, whereas actually youth is an exceedingly critical audience.

By the time he died, the weekly boy's reading papers, which had sustained the genre through serialisation, were all but gone. Eyre said The school story was always an artificial type and its decline towards the middle of the century was neither unexpected nor deplored. Trease noted that the boys’ school-story is – with a few notable exceptions – non-existent in the new lists. (Note: This was long before the advent of Harry Potter and the contested rebirth of the boarding school story.)

== Writing ==
Hadath had his first published juvenile fiction story, a school story, published in The Captain in 1909. It was a story about a boy called Foozle who was to be one of his recurring characters. It may have been that Hadath was already feeling the financial pinch when he wrote the story. He had applied for bankruptcy on 18 November 1909, and owed over three hundred pounds in interest to money lenders when he first appeared in court.

Hadath wrote for The Captain and other boy's papers including Chums, The Modern Boy, and The Boy's Own Paper. His serial stories were almost always published later in book form.

=== Pseudonyms and attribution ===
Hadath used a range of pseudonyms, mainly for his short fiction, with a few exception:

- Duncan James. No potential titles listed under this name n The British Library catalogue.
- Felix O'Grady. No titles listed under this name in The British Library catalogue.
- Florence Gunby Hadath. Florence was Hadath's wife's name, and using this pseudonym he wrote the Pamela series of stories for girls. Four unique titles are listed under this name in The British Library catalogue.
- Shepherd (sometimes given as Shepperd) Pearson The name seems to come from George Shepherd Pearson (second quarter of 1844 – 18 February 1906), Hadath's maternal uncle, who nominated Hadath as one of the executors of his estate. One title listed under this name in The British Library catalogue, The Second Count (1944).
- John Mowbray. John Mowbray were the given names of both Hadath's maternal grandfather Rev. John Mowbray Pearson (11 Feb 1809 – 19 July 1850). and a maternal uncle of the same name (fourth quarter of 1838 – ). Fourteen unique titles under this name are listed in The British Library catalogue.

The authorship of the books by John Mowbray is disputed. Edwards says Mowbray had been identified with Hadath until the British Museum (now Library) catalogue firmly declared Mowbray the pseudonym of one J. G. H. Vahey, with no additional proof. The British Library sometimes indicated pseudonymous authorship unequivocally, as in the case of Harry Collingwood where his books are listed in the catalogue as being authored by Collingwood, Harry, pseud. (i.e. William Joseph Cosens Lancaster.) In the case of John Mowbray, there is now no such unequivocal assignment, it is merely that the year of birth and death are the same as those of Vahey as in Mowbray, John, 1881-1938.

John George Haslette Vahey (1881 – 15 June 1934) was born in Belfast, Northern Ireland and attended Foyle College. He later attended school in Hannover, Germany. He had moved to England by the 1911 census with an address in Bournemouth. Kemp et al. say that Vahey became an accomplished hack writer and published over forty crime novel, fourteen under his own name, twenty-two as Vernon Loder, four as Walter Proudfoot, seven as Henrietta Clandon, and five as Anthony Lang. He also published verse, and a volume of angling stories. He published seven novels under 4 different aliases in 1933, his most productive year. Kemp et al. also say that Vahey published fourteen novels as John Mowbray.

However, it appears that Hadath also used the pseudonym. The evidence for Hadath's authorship of the books by John Mowbray is as follows:

- The Mowbray novels, with one exception, are all juvenile fiction, whereas all the books published by Vahey under his other pseudonyms, are adult crime novels and thrillers.
- The pseudonym, John Mowbray, like the other two pseudonyms which Hadath used for published books, can be found in his family tree.
- Some of the school novels share characters with novels by Hadath.
- Some of the novels are situated near where Hadath spent his summers.
- The plots of the school novels are common (unjustly accused boys, initial conflict ending in friendship) etc. with many of Hadath's works. Kirkpatrick noted that the Mowbray school stories are similar to those written by Hadath

Hubin bibliography of crime fiction in 1984 listed five titles as being by Vahey, using the pseudonym John Mowbray. These were

- Call the Yard. Skeffington, 1931
- The Frontier Mystery. Collins, 1940
- The Megeve Mystery. Collins, 1941
- On Secret Service. Collins, 1939
- The Radio Mystery. Collins, 1941

A sixth title, The Way of the Weasel. Partridge, 1922 was listed as being a questionable inclusion.

Of these titles:

- Only one of these, Call in the Yard is a crime novel, and this is the only one now attributed to Vahey by Hubin in his updated Crime Fiction IV: A Comprehensive Bibliography 1749-2000. The heroes of this story are not English schoolboys, but young American men. It was clearly not juvenile fiction as it was published in the Spring. (Note: At the time, juvenile fiction was almost always first published in September to November for the Christmas gift-book trade.) A reviewer described as a thriller of a rather naive character in parts. It concerns the efforts of a party wealthy and rather scatter-brained young men to secure some treasure, the supposed whereabouts of which they have to shown a crook. It is pure comedy up to the time the dead body of the crook is discovered, and then complications a deadly character ensue. The attribution of this novel to Vahey is without question as Vahey registered the copyright for this work in the United States (this was the only such registration found for the Mowbray novels).
- The next four titles were juvenile fiction, were all published after Vahey's death in 1938, and in most cases had plots centred on the Second World War, which began more than a year after Vahey had died.
- The Way of the Weasel is a public-school story about a boy nicknamed The Weasel.

== Works ==
The following list of major works excludes shorter fiction, the many anthologies and annuals to which Hadath contributed, and only lists the full-length novels. It is drawn from four sources:

- The Jisc Library Hub Discover catalogue. This is a collated catalogue of 161 academic and specialist libraries across the UK and Ireland, including The British Library. The J column in the table indicates if the title appears in the Jisc catalogue.
- The list of school-boy fiction given in Benjamin Watson's English Schoolboy Stories: An annotated bibliography of hardcover fiction (1992) The Scarecrow Press, inc., Metuchen, New Jersey. The W column in the table indicates if the title appears in Watson's list.
- The list of boys' school stories presented in The Encyclopedia of Boys School Stories for both Gunby Hadath and John Mowbray. The E column in the table indicates if the title appears in the Encyclopedia's list.
- The online catalogue of Abe Books for both Gunby Hadath and John Mowbray. The A column in the table indicates if the title appeared in the Abe Books catalogue at 23:00UTC on 23 May 2020. (Note: Unlike the library catalogues, the content of the Abe Books catalogue constantly changes as books are sold or now volumes are offered for sale.)

List of full-length books by Gunby Hadath
No	Year	Title	Illustrator	Publisher	Pages	J	W	E	A	Notes
1	1913	The Feats of Foozle	W. F. Thomas, T. M. R. Whitwell	London, Adam & Charles Black	viii, 237 p., 12 fp ill. (8º)	Yes	Yes	Yes	Yes	(Note: Re-issued as According to Brown Minor in 1924)
2	1913	Schoolboy grit: a public school story	A. Twiddle	London, James Nisbet & Co	vi, 296 p., ill., (8º)	Yes	Yes	Yes	Yes	
3	1913	Paying the price!: a public school story	E. Prater	London, S.W. Partridge	384 p., 5 fp ill., (8º)	Yes	Yes	Yes	Yes	
4	1914	Never say die!: a public school story		London, S.W. Patridge	319 p., 5 fp ill., (8º)	Yes	Yes	No	Yes	(Note: Published in 1916 says Watson and Doyle.)
5	1914	The last of his line: a public school story		London, S.W. Partridge	382 p., 6 fp ill., (8º)	Yes	Yes	Yes	Yes	
6	1915	Sheepy Wilson: a public school story		London, James Nisbet	ix, 304 p., 6 fp ill., (8º)	Yes	Yes	Yes	Yes	
7	1915	The outlaws of St Martyn's, or, The school on the downs		London, S.W. Partridge	384 p., 6 fp ill., (8º)	Yes	Yes	Yes	No	
8	1916	Fall In! A public school story		London, S.W. Partridge	320 p., (8º)	Yes	Yes	Yes	Yes	
9	1922	Won by a try. A story, etc	Frank Gillett	London, Cassell & Co	viii, 293 p., (8º)	Yes	Yes	Yes	Yes	(Note: Some editions have same cover art as wonder island)
10	1923	The New House at Oldborough. A public school story		London, Hodder & Stoughton	319 p., (8º)	Yes	Yes	Yes	Yes	(Note: A reviewer said . . . gets the boys’ noses right into it at the first page. It is calculated to make good boys better and bad boys happier. After all, what can a book do more?)
11	1924	Against the Clock. A public school story		London, Hodder & Stoughton	318 p., (8º)	Yes	Yes	Yes	Yes	
12	1924	His Highness. A public school story		London, T. Nelson & Sons	428 p., (8º)	Yes	Yes	Yes	Yes	
13	1924	Pulling his weight: a public school story		London, Hodder & Stoughton	320 p., 1 ill., (8º)	Yes	Yes	Yes	Yes	
14	1924	Sparrow in Search of Expulsion, etc		London, Hodder & Stoughton	320 p., (8º)	Yes	Yes	Yes	No	
15	1924	The way of the Weasel : a public school story		London, S.W. Partridge	159 p., 1 ill.; (8º)	Yes	No	Yes	Yes	(Note: As John Mowbray. "Weasel" is a boy of small stature, who finds his friend is the victim of a plot at school. He clears up the mystery and justice is done.)
16	1925	The Fattest Head in the Fifth, etc		London, Hodder & Stoughton	319 p., (8º)	Yes	Yes	Yes	Yes	
17	1925	Something like a hero	Henry Matthew Brock	London, Cassell & Co	215 pages; (8º)	Yes	No	Yes	Yes	(Note: As John Mowbray. In the Cassell's New Boys' Library.)
18	1925	Barkworth's Last Year. A school story		London, Cassell & Co	185 pages; (8º)	Yes	No	Yes	Yes	(Note: As John Mowbray in the Cassell's Popular Library for Boys' and Girls. Barkworth is removed after an unjust accusation, but eventually recovers his place.)
19	1926	Go-Bang Garry. A public school story		London, Hodder & Stoughton	318 p., (8º)	Yes	Yes	Yes	Yes	
20	1926	The secret of the code: being the truth of certain recent astonishing happenings at St. Quentin's School, Tidegate, and on the coast by Ottersfoot and Oldport		London, Hodder & Stoughton	319 p., fs, (8º)	Yes	No	Yes	No	
21	1926	The Black Sheep of the School		London, Cassell & Co	185 pages; (8º)	Yes	No	Yes	Yes	(Note: As John Mowbray. In the Cassell's New Boys' Library.)
22	1927	Feversham's fag		London, Cassell & Co	215 pages; (8º)	Yes	No	Yes	Yes	(Note: As John Mowbray. In the Cassell's New Boys' Library. Shares characters with The Fifth Feversham.)
23	1928	Carey of Cobhouse, etc		London, Humphrey Milford	287 p., (8º)	Yes	Yes	Yes	Yes	
24	1928	Sparrow gets going: being the unvarnished truth concerning the notable efforts of Thomas Whitcombe Shirley Sparrow ... to become a great man of business and, perhaps, Lord Mayor of London		London, Hodder & Stoughton	320 p., fs, (8º)	Yes	Yes	No	Yes	(Note: Watson gives the year of publication as 1929. The title is not in Doyle's list. This is a collection of thirty-six Sparrow stories (presumably already published in boys' magazines). A reviewer commented: The tales are neither powerful nor deeply humorous, but the light comedy style runs through them all, and the versatility of Sparrow and his rise in trade will gain many a laugh.)
25	1928	The lost legion: a story of Wallcaster School		London, Hodder & Stoughton	320 p., ill, (8º)	Yes	No	Yes	Yes	
26	1928	Wonder Island, etc		London, Cassell & Co	246 p., (8º)	Yes	No	No	Yes	
27	1928	Dismal Jimmy of the fourth	Henry Matthew Brock	London, Cassell & Co	215 pages; (8º)	Yes	No	Yes	Yes	(Note: As John Mowbray. In the Cassell's New Boys' Library)
28	1929	Young Hendry, etc		London, Hodder & Stoughton	320 p., (8º)	Yes	Yes	Yes	No	
29	1929	Feversham's brother	Henry Matthew Brock	London, Cassell & Co	215 pages; (8º)	Yes	No	Yes	Yes	(Note: As John Mowbray. In the Cassell's New Boys' Library. Shares characters with The Fifth Feversham.)
30	1930	Pamela: a story for girls (and their aunts and uncles)		London, Andrew Dakers	188 p., col fs, (8º)	Yes	No	No	Yes	(Note: As Florence, It's a girls' story so not listed by Watson or Doyle. Pamela, while still at school, is assisting the war effort by driving a Canteen Van. She gains the George Medal from rescues from a bombed school.)
31	1930	St. Palfry's Cross. A story of adventure in the Alps, etc	Margaret Freeman (in the US edition)	London, Cassell & Co	viii, 215 p., (8º)	Yes	No	No	Yes	(Note: Published in the US as Mystery Cross: A Mystery Story for Young People (1931) Frederick A Stokes, New York. In this book a Cornish lad is summoned by a mysterious drummer, to seek a treasure hidden for him and marked with a cross, by his adventurer-father.)
32	1930	The new school at Shropp: a public school story	and R. Mills	London, OUP	283 p., 5 fp ill., (8º)	Yes	Yes	Yes	Yes	
33	1930	The feud at Fennell's	Henry Matthew Brock	London, Cassell & Co	215 pages; (8º)	Yes	No	Yes	Yes	(Note: As John Mowbray. In the Cassell's New Boys' Library. A feud breaks out between day-boys and boarders and two boys work hard to resolve matters.)
34	1931	Brent of Gatehouse. A public school story, etc		London, OUP	282 p., (8º)	Yes	Yes	Yes	Yes	
35	1931	The strongest chap in the school	Henry Matthew Brock	London, Cassell & Co	215 pages; (8º)	Yes	No	Yes	Yes	(Note: As John Mowbray. In the Cassell's New Boys' Library. A boy who has been tutored for years is suddenly sent to school, but object to compulsory games. He struggles with the school's all-rounder and they eventually become friends.)
36	1932	The Big Five! A public school story, etc		London, OUP	288 p., (8º)	Yes	Yes	Yes	Yes	
37	1932	The Mystery of the Seventh Sword		London, Cassell & Co	287 p., (8º)	Yes	No	No	Yes	
38	1933	The mystery at Ridings: a public school story		London, Oxford University Press, Humphrey Milford	286 p., 5 fp ill., (8º)	Yes	Yes	Yes	Yes	
39	1933	Twenty Good Ships. A tale		London, Cassell & Co	256 p., 4 ill., (8º)	Yes	No	No	Yes	(Note: Retitled as "The Mystery of Black Pearl Island" for the US market. Also available in French as "Les Perles noires du pacifique".)
40	1934	Revolt at Fallas, etc		London, OUP	287 p., (8º)	Yes	Yes	Yes	Yes	
41	1935	Grim Work at Bodlands. A public school story	Reginald Mills	London, OUP	287 p., (8º)	Yes	Yes	Yes	Yes	
42	1935	Sparrow in Search of Fame, etc		London, Hutchinson & Co	287 p., (8º)	Yes	Yes	No	Yes	
43	1935	The Hand and the Glove. A public school story		London, George Newnes	255 p., (8º)	Yes	Yes	Yes	Yes	
44	1936	The house that disappeared		London, George Newnes	256 p., fs, (8º)	Yes	Yes	No	Yes	
45	1936	The mystery of the three chimneys	and V. Cooley	London, Thomas Nelson and Sons	vi, 296 p., fs, (8º)	Yes	No	No	Yes	
46	1938	Living up to it: a public school story		London, Collins	320 p., fs, (8º)	Yes	Yes	Yes	No	
47	1938	Major and minor: a public school story	and R. Mills	London, OUP	288 p., ill., (8º)	Yes	Yes	Yes	No	
48	1939	Happy-go-lucky: a public school story	Henry Matthew Brock	London, Collins	256 p., 3 fp ill., (8º)	Yes	Yes	Yes	No	
49	1939	More Pamela	Henry Matthew Brock	London, Collins	288 p., (8º)	Yes	No	No	Yes	(Note: As Florence)
50	1939	On secret service		London, Cassell & Co	303 pages; (8º)	Yes	No	No	Yes	(Note: As John Mowbray. A boy recovers the stolen plans of a new and very secret British aircraft and flies home in the prototype that foreign agents have made from the drawings.)
51	1940	From pillar to post		London, Collins	256 p., ill., (8º)	Yes	No	Yes	Yes	
52	1940	Pamela Calling	Henry Matthew Brock	London, Collins	288 p., (8º)	Yes	No	No	Yes	(Note: As Florence, It's a girls' story so not listed by Watson or Doyle)
53	1940	The seventh swordsman		London, Boys' Own Paper Office	256 p., fs, (8º)	Yes	No	No	Yes	
54	1940	The frontier mystery		London, Cassell & Co	256 pages; (8º)	Yes	No	No	No	(Note: As John Mowbray. A spy tale set in a frontier town on the borders of France, Italy, and Switzerland. Saint-Gervais-les-Bains, where Hadath spent part of every year, fits that description, being less than 25 km from the point where all three countries meet.)
55	1941	Blue berets	R. Sheppard	London, Lutterworth Press	252 p., ill., (8º)	Yes	No	No	Yes	
56	1941	Pamela: George Medal		London, Collins	256 p., (8º)	Yes	No	No	Yes	(Note: As Florence, It's a girls' story so not listed by Watson or Doyle)
57	1941	The radio mystery		London, Collins	254 p.; (8º)	Yes	No	No	Yes	(Note: As John Mowbray. Concerns espionage on the Yorkshire Moors during the Second World War.)
58	1941	The Megève mystery		London, Cassell & Co	256 pages; (8º)	Yes	No	No	Yes	(Note: As John Mowbray. Megève is 4km from the village of Saint-Gervais-les-Bains which made Hadath an honorary citizen.)
59	1942	Grim and gay: the story of a school which stayed put		London, Lutterworth Press	255 p., fs, (8º)	Yes	Yes	Yes	Yes	
60	1942	The swinger: a story of school life in war-time		London, Faber and Faber	254 p., (8º)	Yes	Yes	Yes	Yes	
61	1943	Fight it out		London, Lutterworth Press	254 p., (8º)	Yes	Yes	Yes	Yes	
62	1944	All Clear!: a public school story		London, OUP	192, (8º)	Yes	Yes	Yes	Yes	
63	1944	The Second Count		London, John Gifford Ltd.	280 p.	No	No	No	Yes	(Note: As Shepherd Pearson.)
64	1945	The Bridgehead, etc		London, OUP	192 p., (8º)	Yes	No	Yes	Yes	
65	1945	What's in a Name?		London, Lutterworth Press	221 p., (8º)	Yes	Yes	Yes	Yes	
66	1946	The March of Time. A story of school life in war time		London, Faber & Faber	222 p., (8º)	Yes	Yes	Yes	Yes	
67	1947	Men of the Maquis		London, Lutterworth Press	236 p., (8º)	Yes	No	No	Yes	(Note: Does not appear to be a boys' school story so not listed by Watson or Doyle)
68	1948	Fortune Lane		London, Faber & Faber	189 p., (8º)	Yes	No	No	Yes	(Note: Does not appear to be a boys' school story so not listed by Watson or Doyle. This was filmed as Fortune Lane in 1947. The hero, a boy, is trying to raise money to train as an engineer, but gives his savings to a friend so that he can visit his very ill Grandfather in Ireland.)
69	1948	The Fifth Feversham		London, Lutterworth Press	96 p., (8º)	Yes	Yes	Yes	Yes	
70	1949	The Atom	Norman Howard	London, OUP	v, 186 p., (8º)	Yes	Yes	Yes	Yes	(Note: Nothing to do with physics, the story is about a schoolboy whose energy is out of proportion to his size.)
71	1949	The Shepherd's Guide	John Drever	London, C. & J. Temple	236 p., ill., (8º)	Yes	No	Yes	Yes	
72	1950	No Robbery		London, Lutterworth Press	191 p., (8º)	Yes	Yes	Yes	Yes	
73	1950	Playing the game: a public school story		London, Latimer House	150 p., fs., (8º)	Yes	Yes	Yes	Yes	
74	1953	Honours easy	Drake Brookshaw	London, Thomas Nelson & Sons	vii, 214 p., (8º)	Yes	Yes	Yes	Yes	
