= Extel =

Financial news service

- Formerly: Exchange Telegraph Co. Ltd.
- Industry: Data, Finance
- Founded: 1872; 154 years ago in London, United Kingdom
- Website: extelinsights.com

The Exchange Telegraph Co. Ltd. (also known as Extel) was created in March 1872 specifically to distribute financial and business information from the London Stock Exchange and other commercial markets direct to subscribers. The company established ticker tape telegraph machines in offices, gentlemen's clubs, banks etc. and provided a continuous stream of commercial information to them.

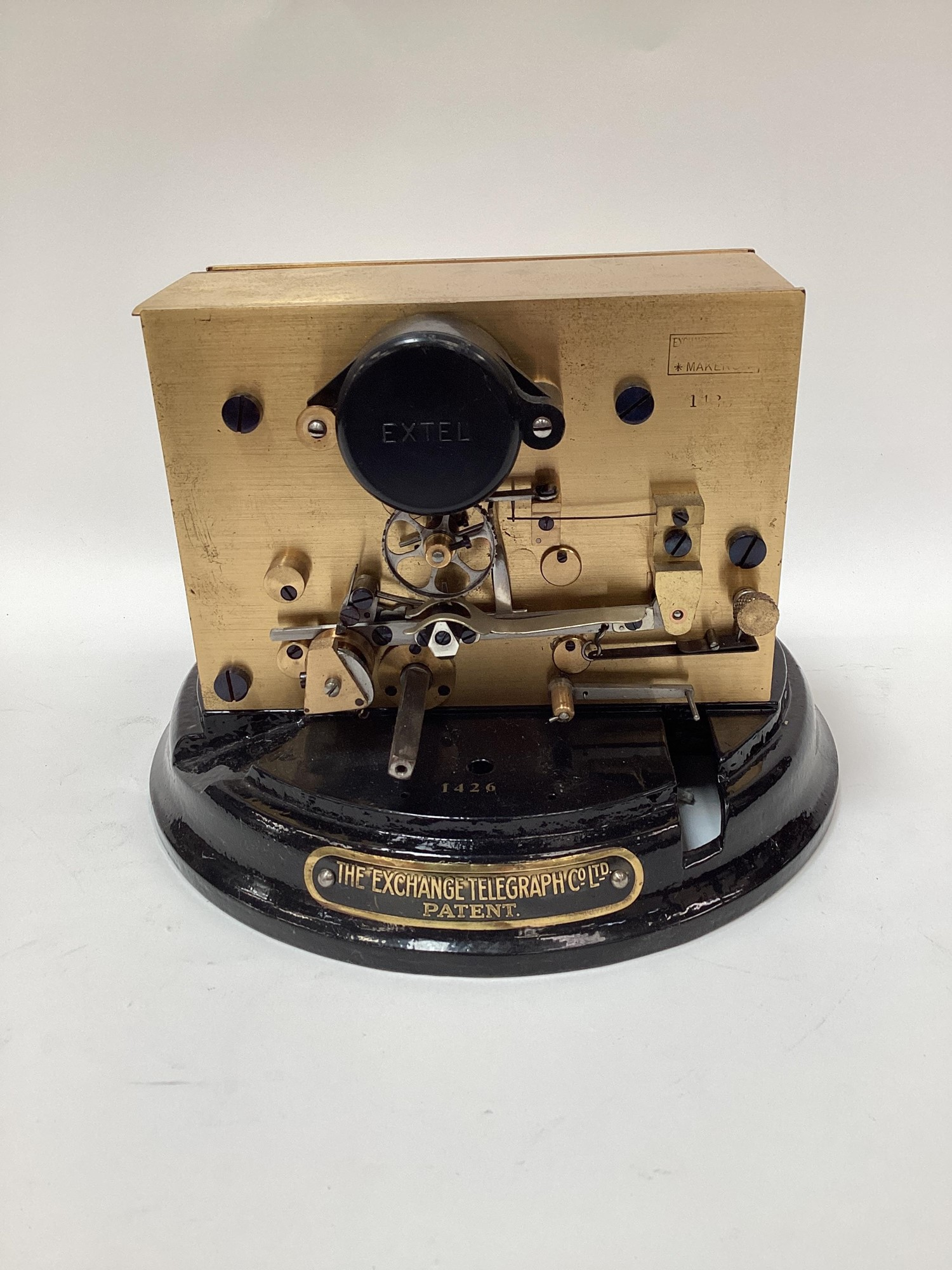
Exchange Telegraph Stock Ticker

It introduced a parliamentary service in 1876, a general news service in 1879 and a legal service in 1891. The business was so successful that by 1906 they had opened ten other branches outside London.

The company continued to grow and improve, becoming increasingly more efficient. It added a faster financial service in 1907 and began operating a worldwide news service in 1913, with a separate sports service included in the 1930s.

Over the course of its history, Extel (the name coming into common use for the company in the 1950s) grew into one of the leading news agencies, provider of financial information and associated businesses. Among the many notable achievement were 'Extel cards', the very first corporate snapshots/tear-sheets with brief data on profit and loss, employees, business activities and executive management. Extel cards, naturally in hard copy, were first produced in 1922.

== Recent history ==
Extel was acquired by United Newspapers in 1987. In 1991, Extel set up a joint venture with Agence France Presse to create a financial news service, AFX News. Pearson plc acquired Extel in 1993 and merged it as Financial Times Information into its Financial Times division. Financial Times reorganised the company into two divisions: Market Data and Research. The research division retained the Extel branding. Primark acquired the Extel brand from Pearson in 1999 and it became part of Thomson Financial in 2000. AFP's share in AFX News was sold in 2006 to Thomson Financial. Thomson Financial and Extel itself was then merged into Thomson Reuters in 2007. By this time, and essentially since 1999, the only commercial and operational part of Extel was the Extel Survey.

In 2016, WeConvene, a cloud-based corporate access platform acquired Extel, and subsequently sold in 2018 to their larger competitor, Institutional Investor, at that time owned by Euromoney. The two survey operations combined to form Institutional Investor Research (II Research). In November 2022, Euromoney was delisted following a purchase by a private equity consortium and II Research was separated from Institutional Investor. In September 2024 II Research rebranded, resurrecting its dormant trading name Extel.

== See also ==
- Digital Microsystems Ltd. (DML)
