= House of Commons of Great Britain =

British Parliament lower house from 1707 to 1801

Coordinates: 51°29′59.6″N 0°07′28.8″W

The Honourable the Commons of the Kingdom of Great Britain in Parliament assembled
- Royal coat of arms of Great Britain, 1714-1800

Type
- Type: Lower house of the Parliament of Great Britain

History
- Established: 1 May 1707
- Disbanded: 31 December 1800
- Preceded by: House of Commons of England; Third Estate of the Parliament of Scotland
- Succeeded by: House of Commons of the United Kingdom

Leadership
- Speaker of the House: Henry Addington since 1789

Structure
- Seats: 558
- Salary: none

Elections
- Voting system: First past the post with limited suffrage

Meeting place
- St Stephen's Chapel, Palace of Westminster, Westminster, London

Footnotes
- See also: Irish House of Commons

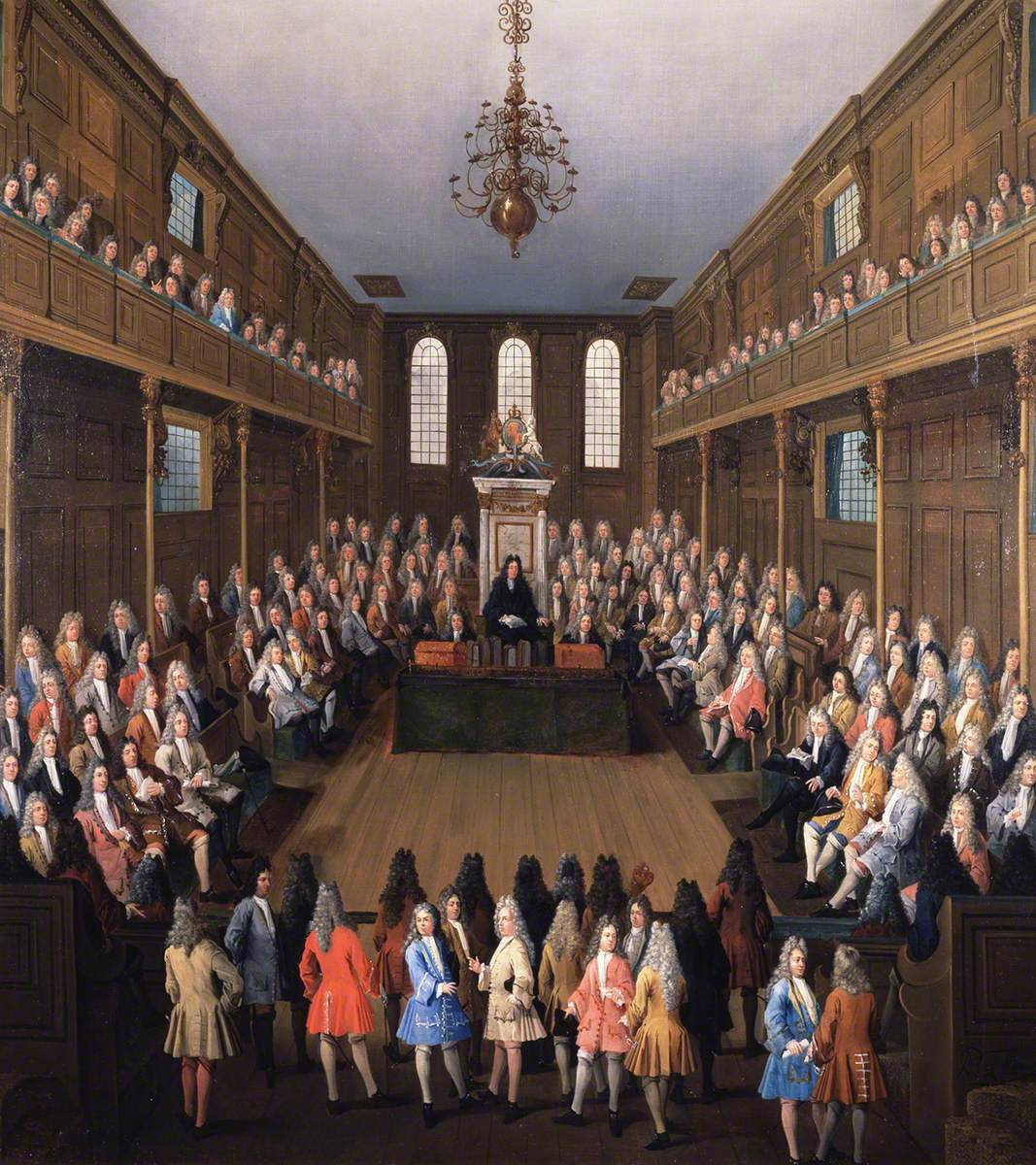
Interior of the House of Commons In Session by Peter Tillemans, c. 1710

The House of Commons of Great Britain was the lower house of the Parliament of Great Britain between 1707 and 1801. In 1707, as a result of the Acts of Union of that year, it replaced the House of Commons of England and the third estate of the Parliament of Scotland, as one of the most significant changes brought about by the Union of the kingdoms of England and Scotland into the Kingdom of Great Britain.

In the course of the 18th century, the office of prime minister developed. The notion that a government remains in power only as long as it retains the support of Parliament also evolved, leading to the first motion of no confidence, when Lord North's government failed to end the American Revolution. The modern notion that only the support of the House of Commons is necessary for a government to survive, however, was of later development. Similarly, the custom that the prime minister is always a member of the lower house, rather than the upper one, did not evolve until the twentieth century.

The business of the house was controlled by an elected speaker. The speaker's official role was to moderate debate, make rulings on procedure, announce the results of votes, and the like. The speaker decided who may speak and had the powers to discipline members who break the procedures of the house. The speaker often also represented the body in person, as the voice of the body in ceremonial and some other situations. The title was first recorded in 1377 to describe the role of Thomas de Hungerford in the Parliament of England. By convention, speakers are normally addressed in Parliament as Mister Speaker, if a man, or Madam Speaker, if a woman.

In 1801, the House was enlarged to become the House of Commons of the United Kingdom, as a result of the Act of Union of 1800 which combined Great Britain and the Kingdom of Ireland into the United Kingdom of Great Britain and Ireland.

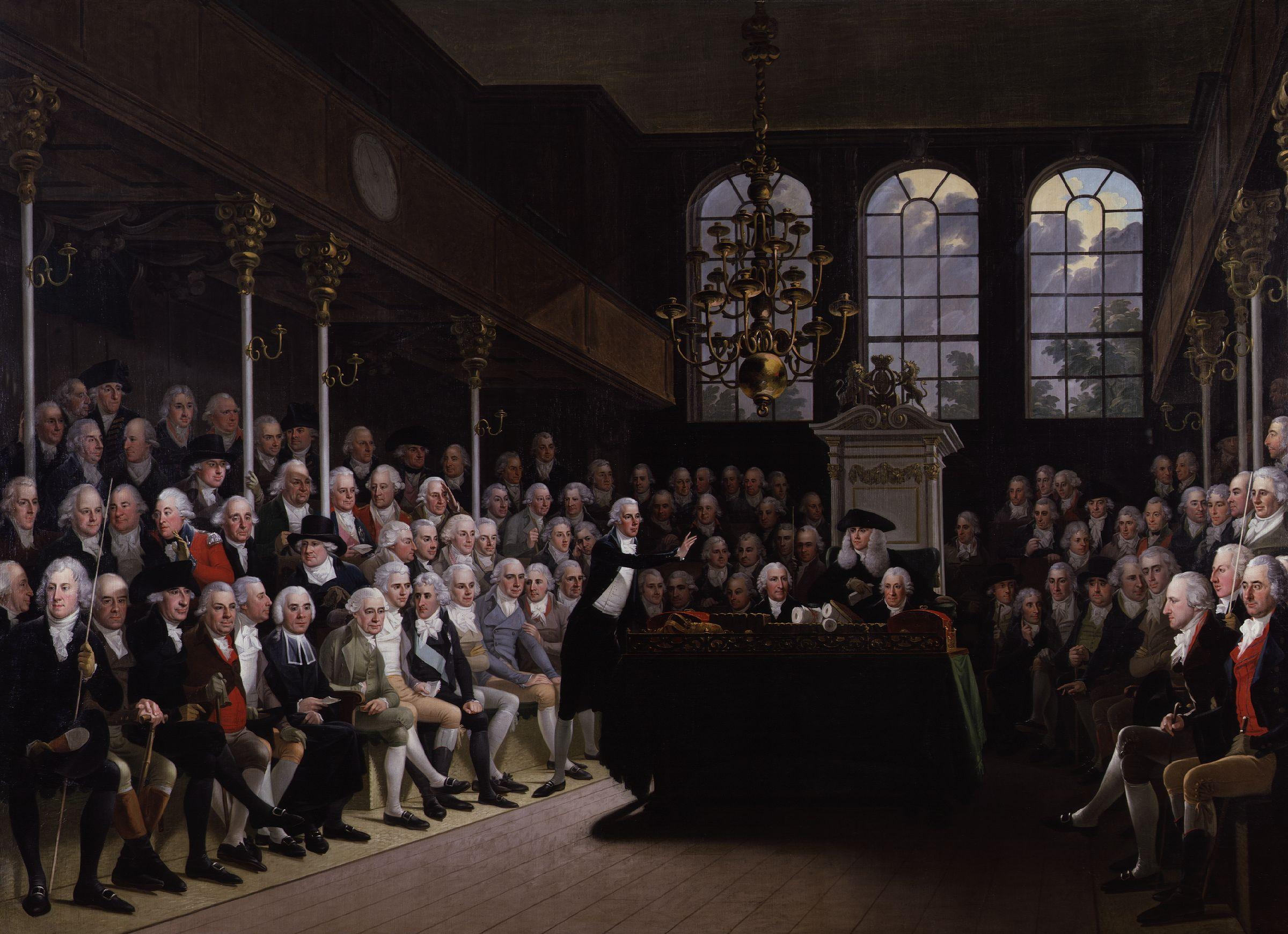
Pitt addressing the House in The House of Commons, 1793–94 by Anton Hickel

== Creation ==
The members of the last House of Commons of England had been elected between 7 May and 6 June 1705, and from 1707 they all continued to sit as members of the new House of Commons. The last general election in Scotland had been held in the autumn of 1702, and from 1707 only forty-five of the members of the Parliament of Scotland joined the new house. In Scotland there was also no new election from the burghs, and the places available were filled by co-option from the last Parliament.

== Parliamentary constituencies ==
The constituencies which elected members in England and Wales remained unchanged throughout the existence of the Parliament of Great Britain.

Table of Constituencies and Members of the Parliament
Country	Constituencies				Members			
Country	Borough /Burgh	County	University	Total	Borough /Burgh	County	University	Total
England	203	40	2	245	405	80	4	489
Wales	12	12	0	24	12	12	0	24
Scotland	15	30	0	45	15	30	0	45
Total	230	82	2	314	432	122	4	558

Sources:

- Chris Cook & John Stevenson, British Historical Facts 1760-1830 (The Macmillan Press, 1980)
- Colin Rallings & Michael Thrasher, British Electoral Facts 1832-1999 (Ashgate Publishing Ltd, 2000)

== House of Commons of Great Britain ==
Whigs / Position Uncertain / Scottish Ministerial Support / Patriot Whigs / Tories		Total seats
1708	268 / 20 / 45 / 225	558
1710	196 / 16 / 346	558
1713	161 / 28 / 369	558
1715	341 / 217	558
1722	389 / 169	558
1734	330 / 83 / 145	558
1741	186 / 131 / 136	558
1747	338 / 97 / 117	558
1754	368 / 42 / 106	558
1761	446 / 112	558

=== 1768 – 1806 ===
Radical / Foxites / Rockinghamites / Grenvillites / Bedfordites / Position Uncertain / Ministerialist/Northite/Pittite / Addingtonian / Former Tories		Total seats
1768	1 / 57 / 31 / 20 / 175 / 221 / 53	558
1774	1 / 215 / 343	558
1780	1 / 254 / 260	558
1784	1 / 155 / 122 / 280	558
1790	183 / 35 / 340	558
1796	95 / 39 / 424	558

== See also ==
- Elections in Great Britain
- Unreformed House of Commons
- List of parliaments of Great Britain
- First Parliament of Great Britain
- 2nd Parliament of Great Britain
- List of members of the House of Commons at Westminster 1705–1708
- List of speakers of the British House of Commons
- The Structure of Politics at the Accession of George III
