= Elections in the Kingdom of Great Britain =

Elections in the Kingdom of Great Britain were principally general elections and by-elections to the House of Commons of Great Britain. General elections did not have fixed dates, as parliament was summoned and dissolved within the royal prerogative, although on the advice of the ministers of the Crown. The first such general election was that of 1708, and the last that of 1796.

In 1801, the United Kingdom of Great Britain and Ireland replaced the Kingdom of Great Britain and the Kingdom of Ireland. For the period after 1801, see Elections in the United Kingdom.

== Elections ==
For details of the national elections of Great Britain, see:

- 1707 British general election
- 1708 British general election
- 1710 British general election
- 1713 British general election
- 1715 British general election
- 1722 British general election
- 1727 British general election
- 1734 British general election
- 1741 British general election
- 1747 British general election
- 1754 British general election
- 1761 British general election
- 1768 British general election
- 1774 British general election
- 1780 British general election
- 1784 British general election
- 1790 British general election
- 1796 British general election

== Political factions ==
Politics in Great Britain was dominated by the Whigs and the Tories, although neither were political parties in the modern sense but loose alliances of interests and individuals. The Whigs included many of the leading aristocratic dynasties who were most committed to the Protestant settlement of the throne, with later support from the emerging industrial interests and rich city merchants, while the Tories were associated with the landed gentry, the Church of England and the Church of Scotland.

Members of Parliament needed to appeal to a much smaller electorate than is the case today, especially in the boroughs. In the case of the rotten and pocket boroughs, a majority of the votes was usually controlled by one person, or by a small group. This gave less power to organized political parties and more to influential individuals, some of whom had themselves elected in the constituencies they controlled. Such seats were also sold for hard cash. Thus, many members were fundamentally Independents, even if they attached themselves to one party or another during their parliamentary careers.

Parliamentary constituencies and seats in the House of Commons
Country	Borough constituencies	County constituencies	University constituencies	Total constituencies	Borough MPs	County MPs	University MPs	Total MPs
England	203	40	2	245	405	80	4	489
Wales	12	12	0	24	12	12	0	24
Scotland	15	30	0	45	15	30	0	45
Total	230	82	2	314	432	122	4	558

== Local elections ==
There were few local elections in the Kingdom of Great Britain as the concept is now understood. Local government existed only in rudimentary forms. Much of the civil administration of rural England was carried out by informal, unelected parish councils known as vestries, with criminal matters dealt with by Quarter Sessions and magistrates, and similar arrangements in Scotland. In the City of London, annual elections were held to the Corporation of London, but on a limited suffrage, and some improvement commissioners were elected by ratepayers, if not co-opted, while the borough and city corporations elsewhere were generally not directly elected.

For further information on local corporations during this period, see the reforming Municipal Corporations Act 1835 and History of local government in Scotland.

== See also ==
- List of parliaments of Great Britain
- History of the British constitution
- List of counties and boroughs of the Unreformed House of Commons at 1800
- List of parliamentary constituencies in Scotland from 1707
- Scottish Westminster constituencies
- Electoral system
- Election agent
- Polling agent
- Counting agent
- University constituency
- Rotten borough

== Sources ==
- Cowan, D. (2024). "Pittite Triumph and Whig Failure in the Cambridge University Constituency, 1780–96". Parliamentary History. 43 (1). doi:10.1111/1750-0206.12724.
