= Portrait of Charles James Fox =

Painting by Anton Hickel

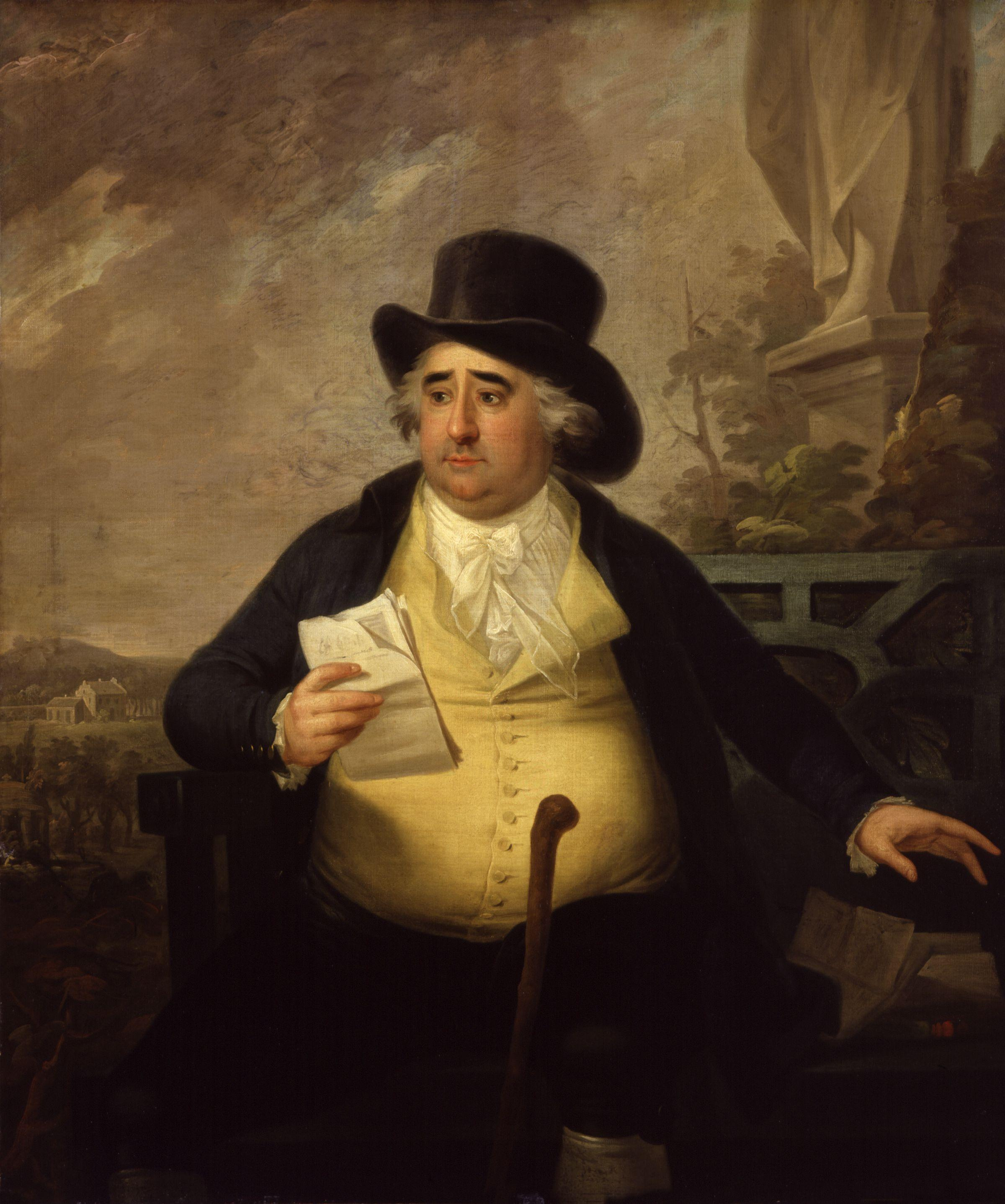
- Artist: Anton Hickel
- Year: 1794
- Type: Oil on canvas, portrait painting
- Dimensions: 132.1 cm × 113 cm (52.0 in × 44 in)
- Location: National Portrait Gallery; London

Portrait of Charles James Fox is a 1794 portrait painting by the Austrian artist Anton Hickel. It depicts the British politician Charles James Fox. A Whig, Fox was known for his liberalism and his long-standing rivalry with William Pitt the Younger. He spent most of his career in opposition, twice briefly serving as Foreign Secretary in the Fox-North Coalition and the Ministry of All the Talents.

While in England Hickel also produced The House of Commons, 1793–94, featuring Fox amongst other leading politicians of era. Fox sat for this portrait at his country estate at Chertsey in Surrey. Today the painting is in the collection of the National Portrait Gallery in London, having been purchased in 1885.

== Bibliography ==
- Faria, Jr., Miguel A. Contrasting Ideals and Ends in the American and French Revolutions. Cambridge Scholars Publishing, 2024.
- Grant, James. Friends Until the End: Edmund Burke and Charles Fox in the Age of Revolution. W. W. Norton, 2025.
- Ingamells, John. National Portrait Gallery Mid-Georgian Portraits, 1760-1790. National Portrait Gallery, 2004.
