= Joseph Hickel =

Austrian painter (1736–1807)

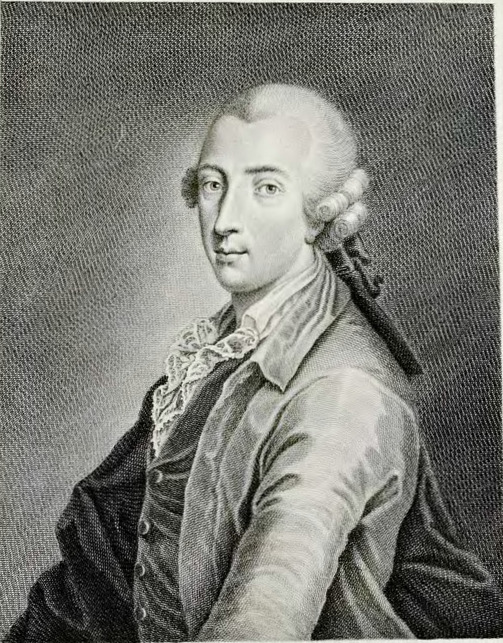
- Engraving of Self-portrait, 1769, Uffizi Gallery
- Born: 19 March 1736; Böhmisch-Leipa, Kingdom of Bohemia
- Died: 28 March 1807 (aged 71); Vienna, Archduchy of Austria
- Other name: Josef Hickel
- Education: Johann Hickel (father); Martin van Meytens; Academy of Fine Arts Vienna
- Known for: Imperial-Royal Portraiture
- Movement: Early Classicism (transitional from Baroque and Rococo)
- Relatives: Anton Hickel (brother)
- Elected: Academy of Fine Arts, Florence (1769); Academy of Fine Arts Vienna (1776)
- Patrons: Empress Maria Theresa; Joseph II, Holy Roman Emperor

Joseph Hickel (19 March 1736 – 28 March 1807) was a portraitist born in Böhmisch-Leipa, who served as the imperial-royal court painter (k.k. Kammermaler) to the Habsburg monarchy in Vienna.

He is best known for his portraits of Emperor Joseph II, which were created during the Josephinian Enlightenment.

A student of Martin van Meytens, Hickel departed from the opulent Baroque traditions of his mentor, moving Viennese portraiture toward a more restrained and psychologically grounded style aligned with Early Classicism.

== Biography ==
Hickel received his initial training from his father, Johann Hickel (1705–1778), a Prague-born painter who worked in Böhmisch-Leipa (now Česká Lípa). By the age of 12, Hickel was painting in oil, and at 15, he completed a full-scale altarpiece for the town church of Hirschberg am See (now Doksy) in Bohemia. His younger brother, Anton Hickel (1745–1798), also became a painter and studied under his guidance for a time.

In 1756, he moved to Vienna to study portraiture at the Imperial Academy of Fine Arts. His talent brought him to the attention of Empress Maria Theresa, who funded his extended studies in Italy. In Milan, Parma, and Florence, he painted numerous portraits of the Habsburg archdukes and archduchesses ruling the Italian courts, commissioned by the Empress. Once back in Vienna, he temporarily fell out of imperial favor due to court rivalries. Hickel used this period to hone his skills further, and in 1769, the Florentine Academy inducted him as a member.

=== Court appointment and career ===
Upon his return to Vienna, he was commissioned to paint a portrait of Emperor Joseph II. The work impressed both the Empress Maria Theresa and Emperor Joseph II, and Hickel was appointed imperial-royal court painter (k.k. Kammermaler) in 1771. In 1778, he applied unsuccessfully for the directorship of the Vienna Academy. As Hickel continued his work as court painter, he established a consistent style for the imperial portraits. For subsequent works—whether bust-length or full-length—he reused a signature head tilt to the half-left, featuring sharply modeled facial features and eyes fixed on the viewer. This format became the standard pose for the Emperor's official portraits.

=== Social circle and the "Mozart Connection" ===
Both Joseph Hickel and Wolfgang Amadeus Mozart moved within the same Viennese artistic and social circles during the 1780s, largely due to their connections at the imperial court. Musicologist Michael Lorenz demonstrated that Mozart composed his Wind Serenade No. 11 in E-flat major, K. 375, specifically for St. Teresa's Day in 1781. It was premiered at the Hickel family residence for Hickel's sister-in-law, Theresia Wutka. Mozart's letters to his father show that he used the celebration to gain favor with the imperial valet, Johann Kilian Strack. Because Strack was a frequent guest of the Hickel family and had direct access to the sovereign, Mozart hoped the performance would secure an introduction to Emperor Joseph II.

=== Later career and recognition ===
Among Hickel's most noted works are his portraits of Emperor Joseph II, who sat for him five times. This was unusual, as the Emperor was notoriously impatient and described himself as 'always in a hurry' (immer pressé). These works include portraits displayed in the Magistratssaal (Magistrate's Hall) of the Old Vienna City Hall and at Neuwaldegg Castle.

The 19th-century art historian Gottfried Johannes Dlabacz praised Hickel’s ability to bridge late Baroque elegance and Neoclassical clarity, writing: "His brushwork is vigorous and expressive, his portraits deliver striking likenesses, and his coloring is exceptionally vivid. Overall, he captured his subjects with distinct individuality." In Vienna's 14th district, Hickelgasse was later named in his honor.

=== Personal life ===
On 14 May 1770, Hickel married Margaritha Josepha Wutka (also recorded as Margarethe; 1753–1831) in Vienna. She was the daughter of Franz Engelbert Wutka, a local official who served as a secretary to Prince Emanuel von Liechtenstein, a controller for the imperial gunpowder and saltpeter administration, and the administrator of the imperial armory (Arsenalverwalter). While their marriage remained childless, the Hickel residence served as a central gathering place for Viennese society.

Her sister, Theresia Wutka, hosted the family’s weekly social and musical events, which drew members of imperial court society, high-ranking administrators, and celebrated artists. Through these circles, the Hickel family developed a lasting relationship with Wolfgang Amadeus Mozart.

== Selected works ==
Among his most notable paintings are portraits of:

=== The Sovereigns of the Habsburg Monarchy ===
- Maria Theresa, Holy Roman Empress
- Joseph II, Holy Roman Emperor
- Leopold II, Holy Roman Emperor
- Francis II, Holy Roman Emperor

=== The Imperial Family and Royalty ===
- Prince Albert of Saxony, Duke of Teschen and Archduchess Maria Christina, Duchess of Teschen
- King Ferdinand of Naples and his wife Maria Carolina of Austria
- Queen Marie Antoinette of France

=== Spiritual and Military Leaders ===
- Pope Pius VI
- General Count von Lacy

=== Statesmen and Ministers ===
- Prince Kaunitz
- Franz de Paula Ulrich, 3rd Prince Kinsky of Wchinitz and Tettau
- Franz Josef von Saurau, Count von Saurau

== Gallery ==
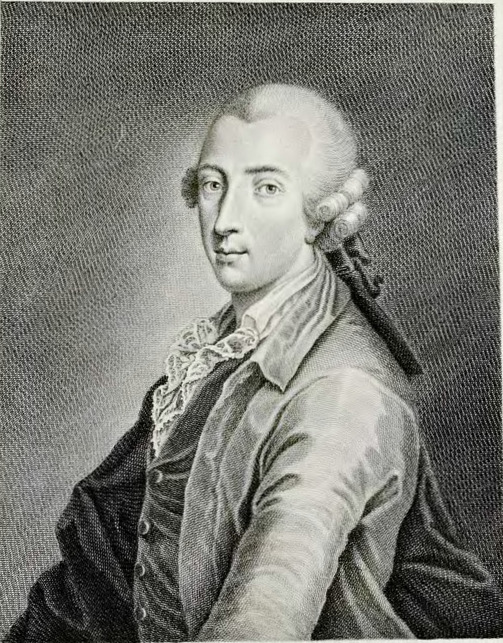
Engraving of Self-portrait, 1769, Uffizi Gallery

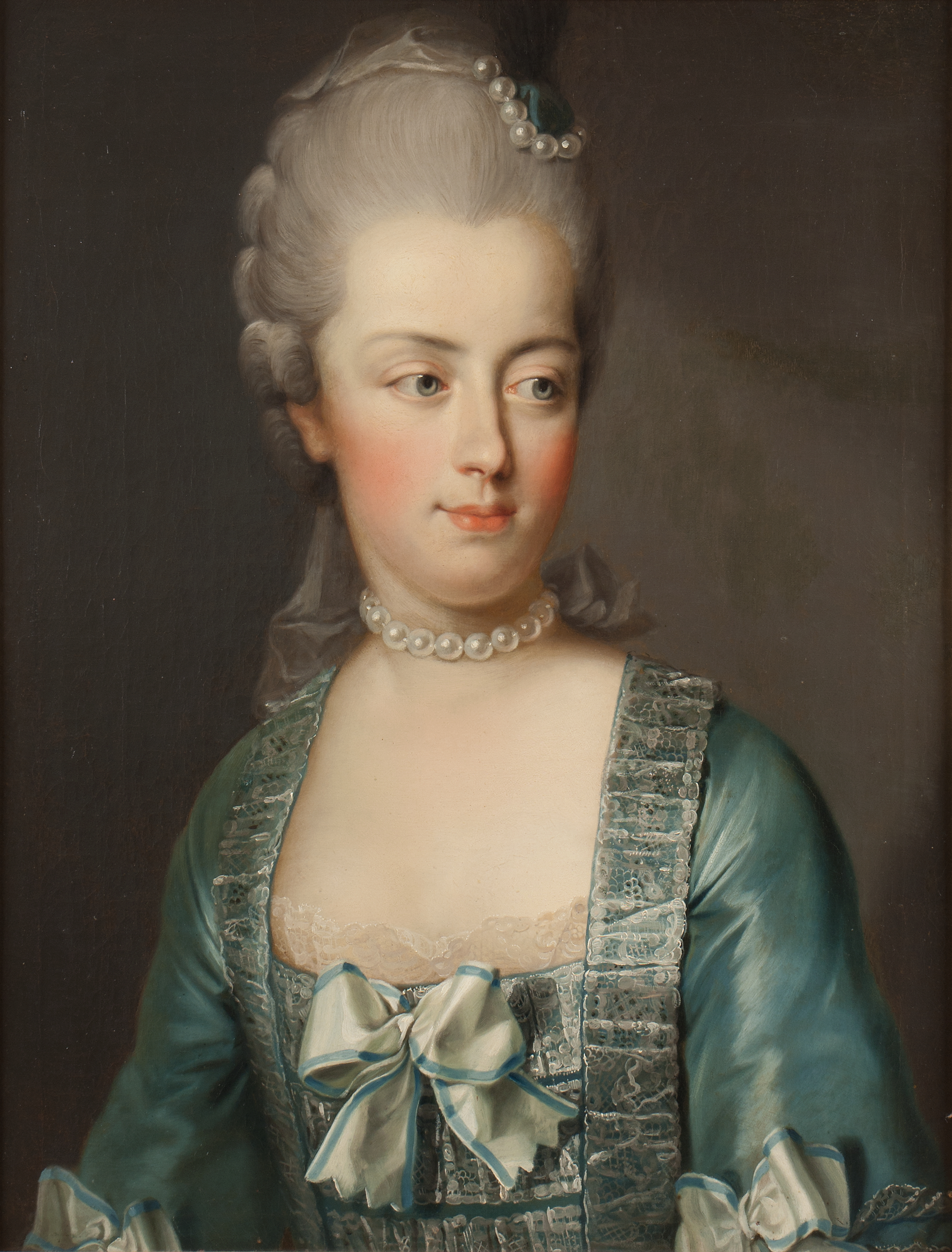
Archduchess Maria Antonia (Marie Antoinette, later Queen of France), 1773, Gripsholm Castle

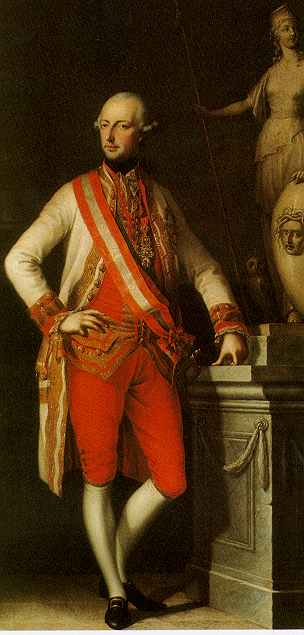
Emperor Joseph II in Uniform, 1776, Heeresgeschichtliches Museum

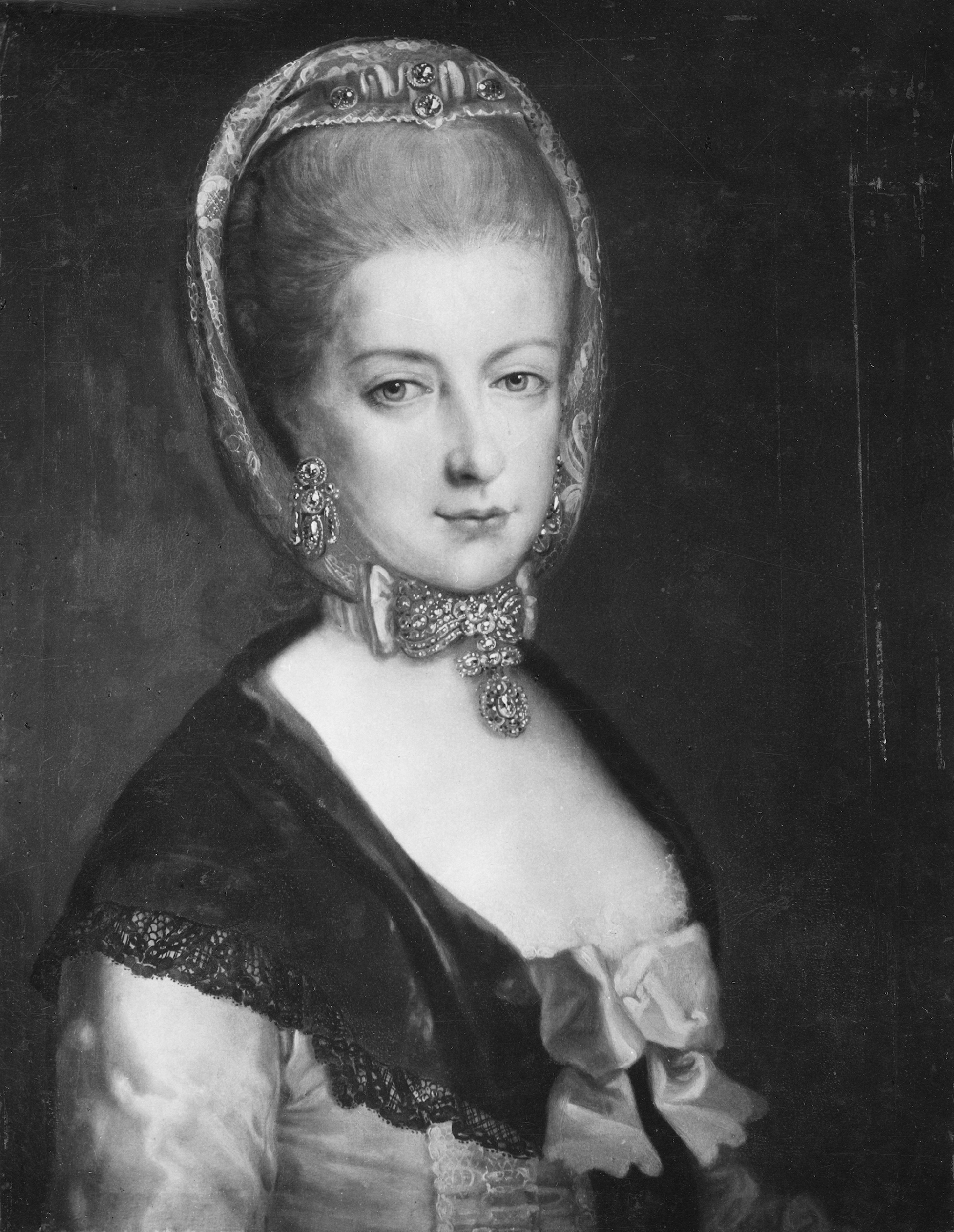
Archduchess Maria Kristina, 1770s, Gripsholm Castle

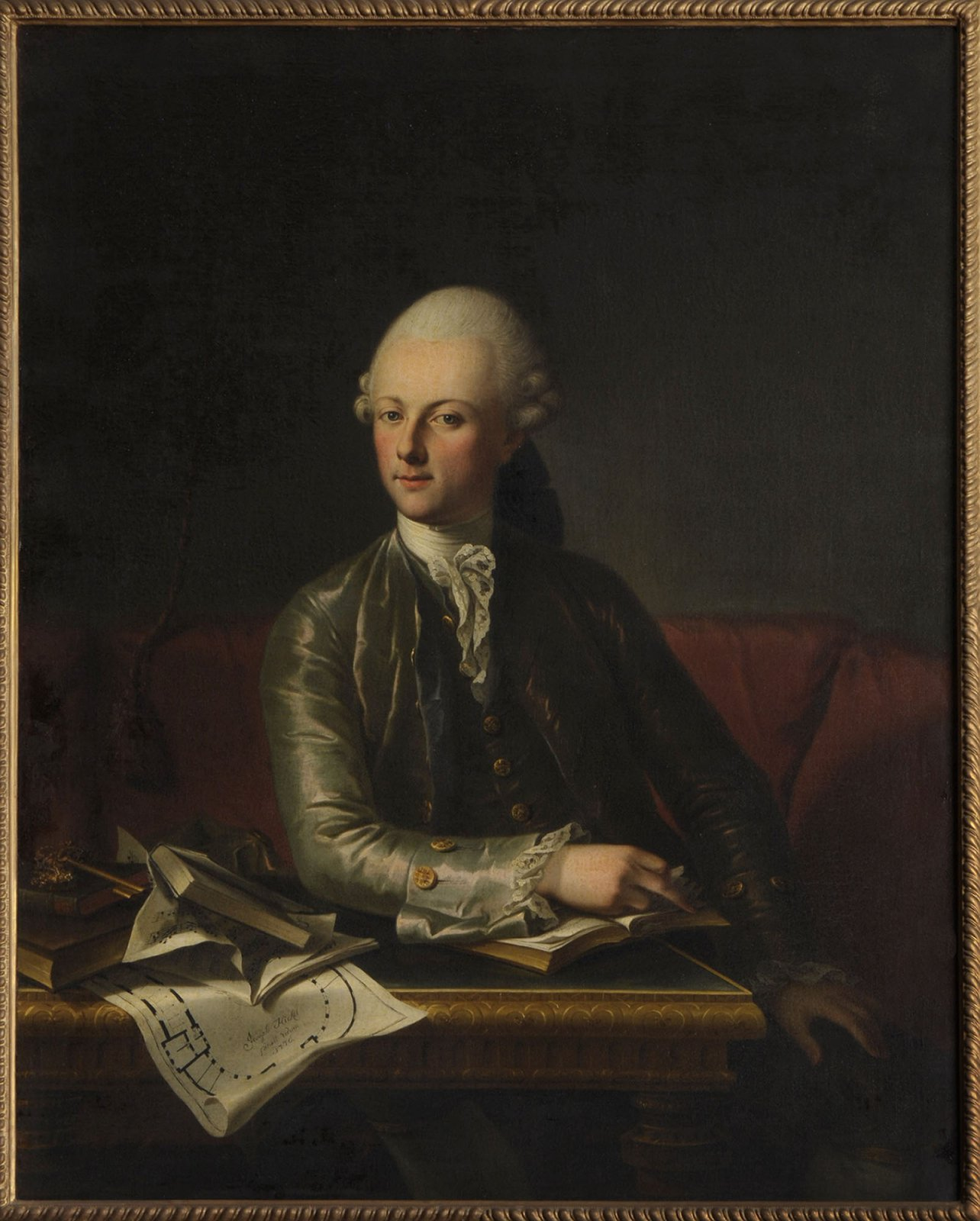
Portrait of Count Karl Joseph of Salm-Reifferscheidt, c. 1780, State Chateau of Rájec nad Svitavou

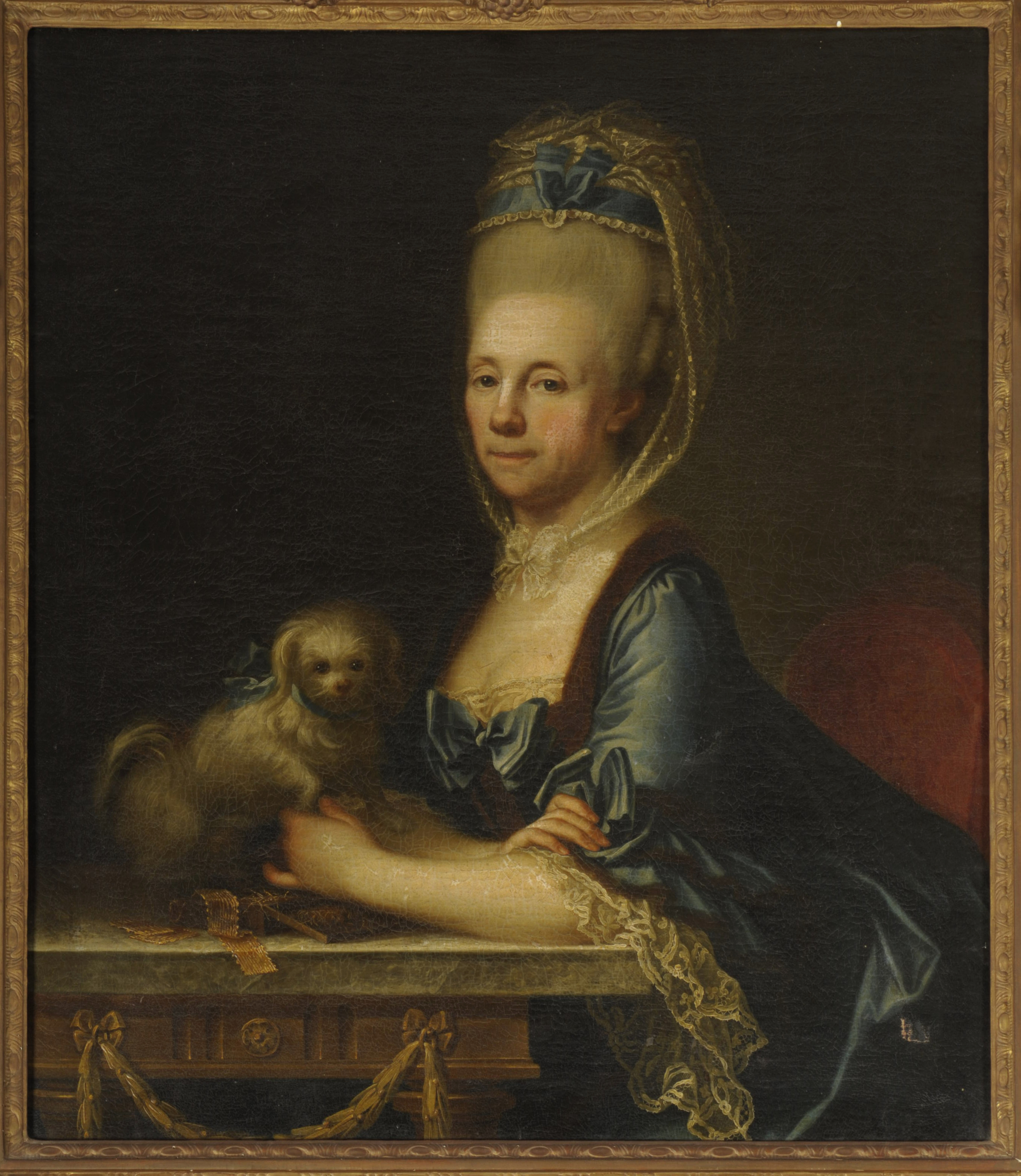
Portrait of Countess Rafaela Salm-Reifferscheidt, c. 1780, State Chateau of Rájec nad Svitavou

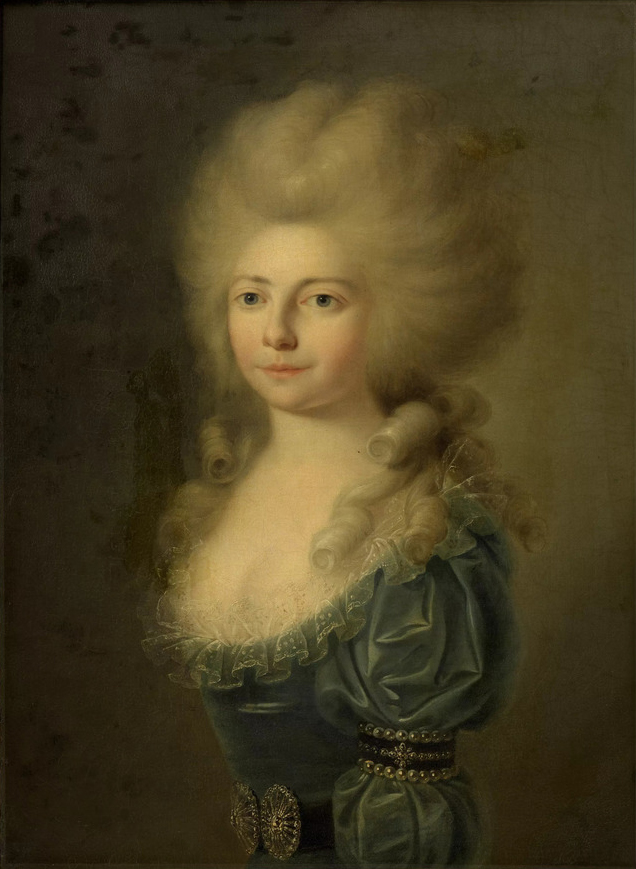
Archduchess Elisabeth Wilhelmine von Württemberg, c. 1785, Wien Museum

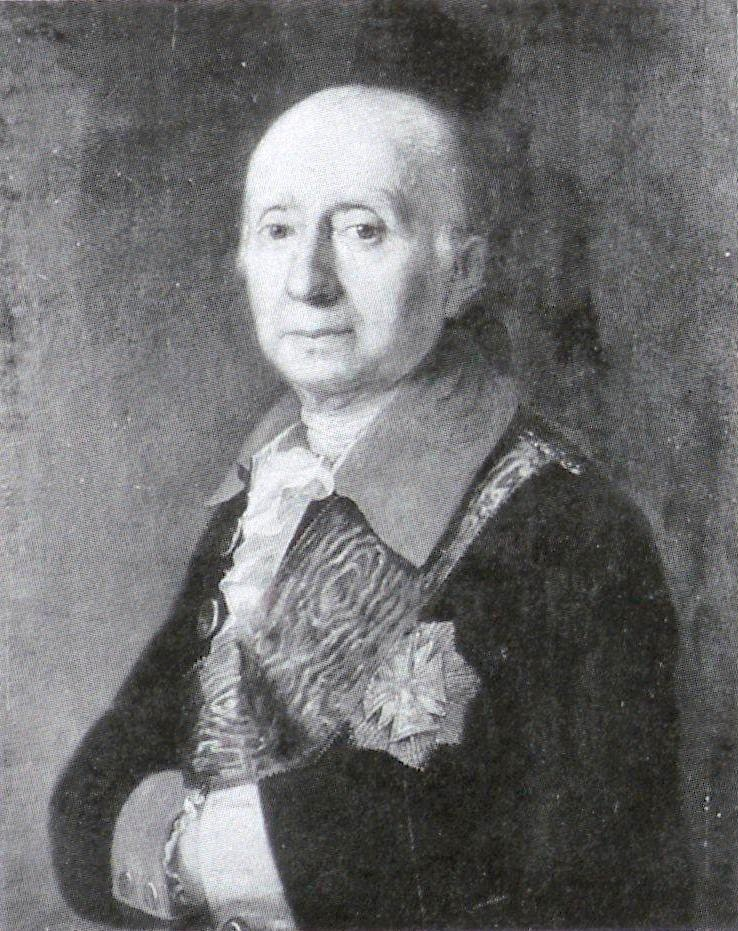
Portrait of Count Maciej Lanckoroński, 1788, Royal Castle in Warsaw

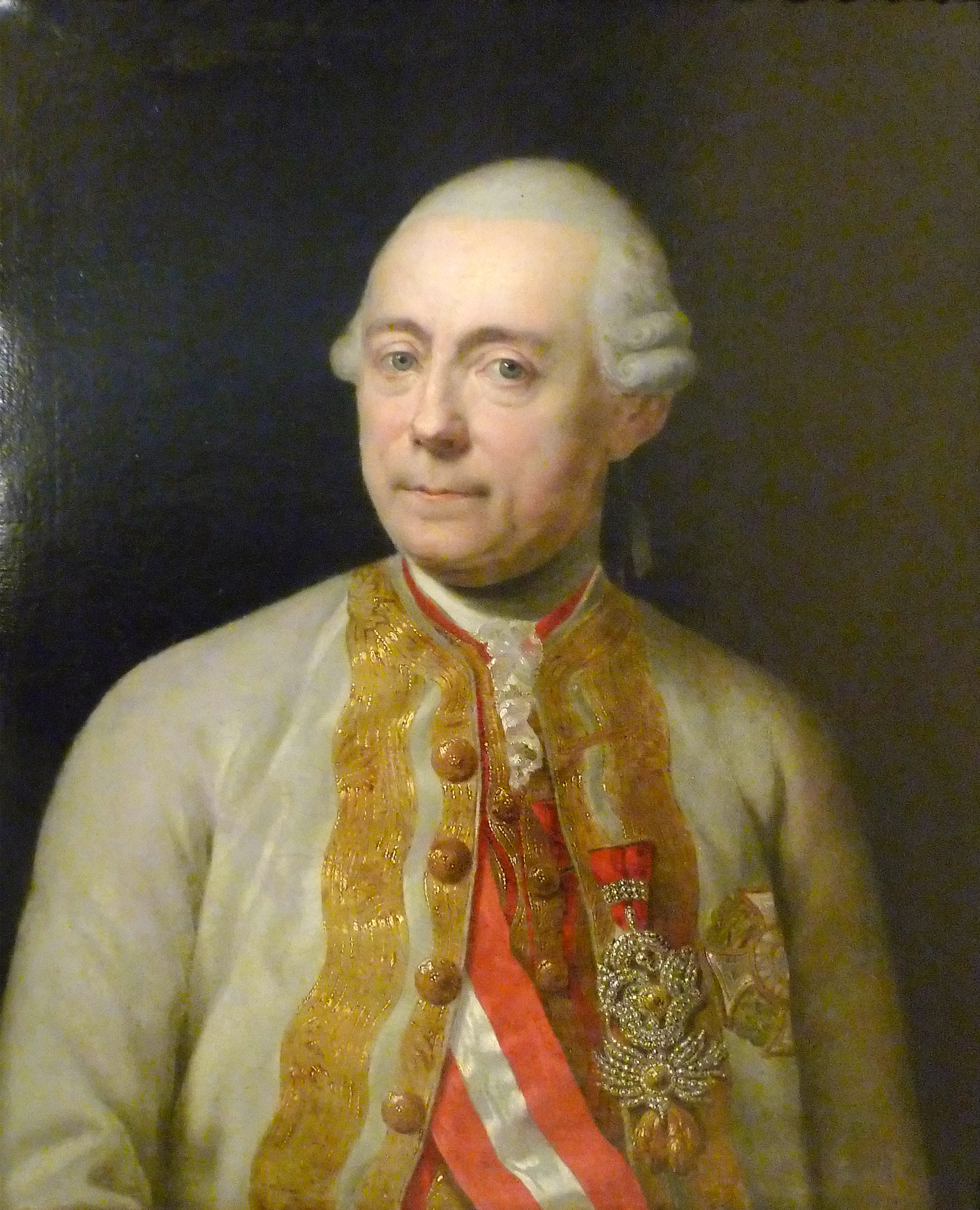
Count Franz Moritz von Lacy, Heeresgeschichtliches Museum

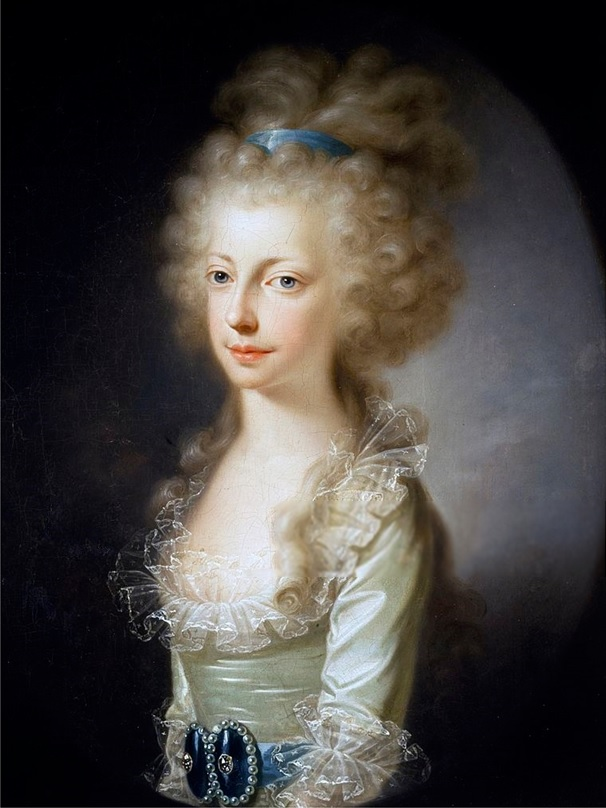
Archduchess Maria Clementina, 1796, Gripsholm Castle

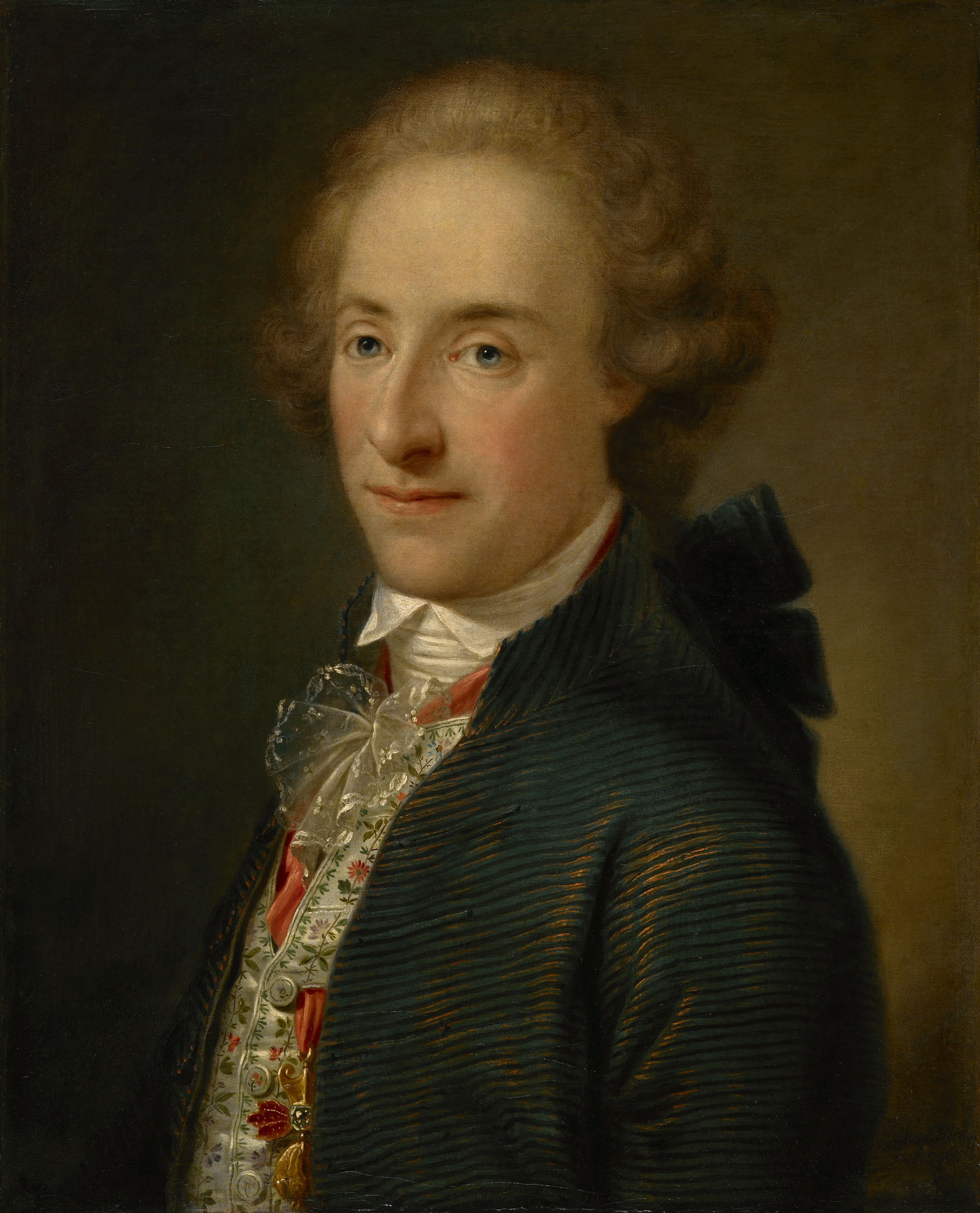
Portrait of Prince Alois I von Liechtenstein, 1796, LIECHTENSTEIN. The Princely Collections

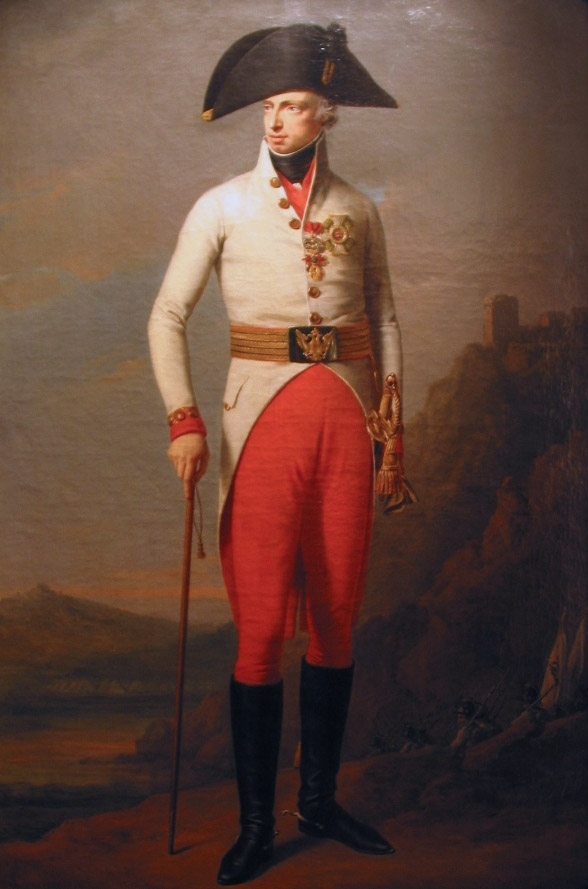
Archduke Charles of Austria, Duke of Teschen, 1800, Heeresgeschichtliches Museum

== Museum collections ==
Joseph Hickel's original paintings, along with the widespread copperplate engravings, etchings, and mezzotints based on his portraits, are preserved in numerous international institutions, including:

=== Austria ===
- Albertina, Vienna
- Burgtheater Portrait Gallery, Vienna
- Heeresgeschichtliches Museum, Vienna
- Kunsthistorisches Museum, Vienna
- The Princely Collections, Vaduz–Vienna
- Österreichische Galerie Belvedere, Vienna
- Austrian National Library, Vienna
- Universalmuseum Joanneum, Graz
- Vienna Museum, Vienna

=== Czech Republic ===
- Chateau Jaroměřice nad Rokytnou
- Museum of Fine Arts, Liberec
- State Chateau of Rájec nad Svitavou

=== France ===
Château de Versailles, Versailles

=== Germany ===
- Germanisches Nationalmuseum, Nürnberg
- Museum für Franken, Würzburg
- Kunstsammlungen und Museen Augsburg
- Stiftung Preußische Schlösser und Gärten Berlin-Brandenburg, Potsdam

=== Hungary ===
Hungarian National Museum, Budapest

Museum of Fine Arts, Budapest

=== Italy ===
- Palace of Caserta
- Royal Palace of Naples
- Uffizi Gallery, Florence

=== Romania ===
- Muzeul Țării Crișurilor, Oradea
- National Union Museum, Alba Iulia

=== Russia ===
- The Hermitage Museum, St. Petersburg

=== Sweden ===
- Gripsholm Castle, Mariefred
- Nationalmuseum, Stockholm

=== United Kingdom ===
- British Museum, London
- National Portrait Gallery, London
- Royal Collection, Windsor Castle

=== Other international collections ===
- Bratislava City Gallery, Slovakia
- Rijksmuseum, Amsterdam, Netherlands
- Royal Castle, Warsaw, Poland

== See also ==
- Martin van Meytens, mentor and prominent Baroque Habsburg court painter
- Anton Hickel, younger brother and portraitist
- Heinrich Friedrich Füger, fellow court painter active in late 18th-century Vienna
- Johann Baptist von Lampi the Elder, leading Austrian portrait master of the era
- List of Austrian artists and architects
