= The House of Commons, 1793–94 =

Painting by Anton Hickel

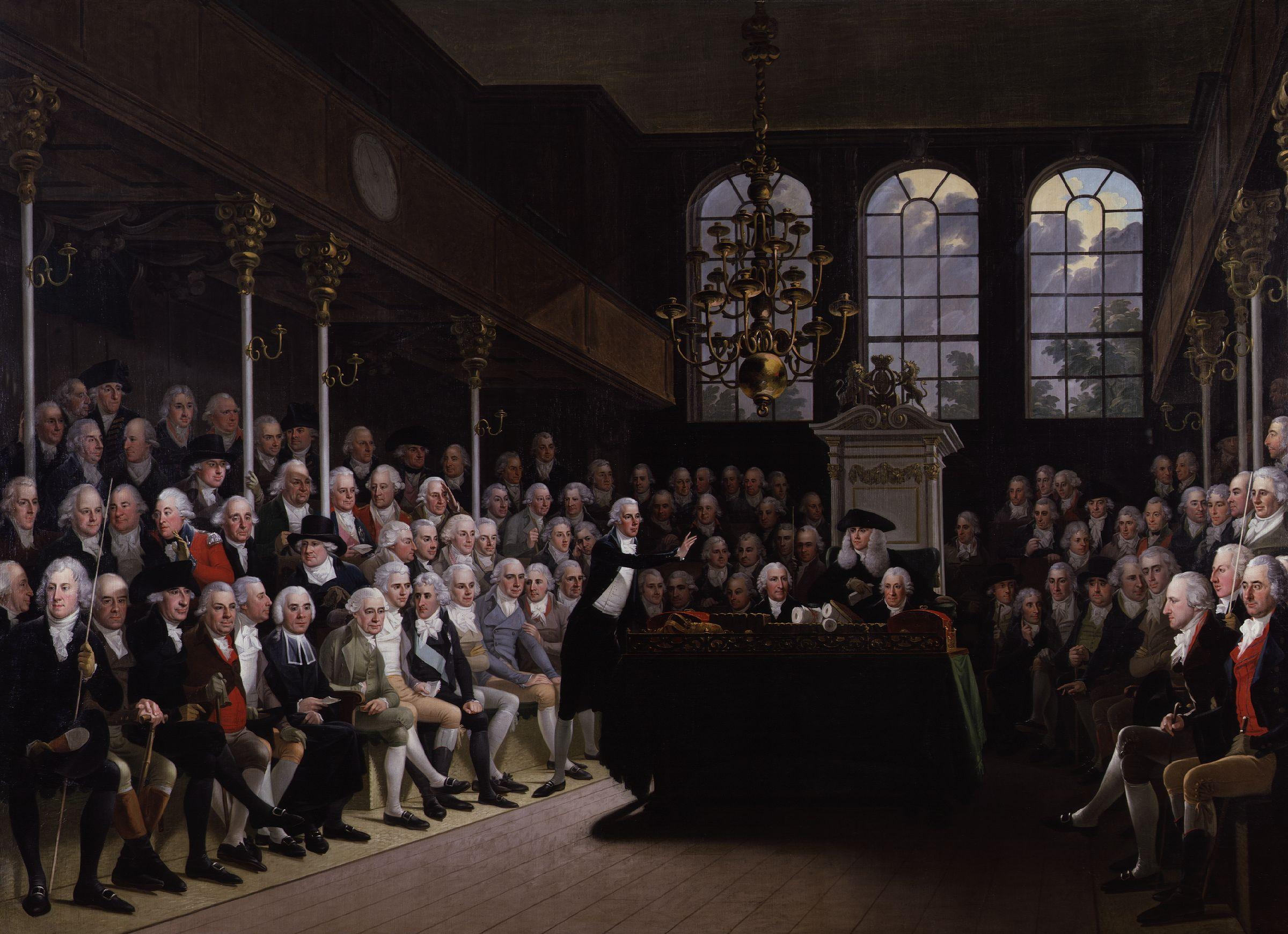
- Artist: Anton Hickel
- Year: 1795
- Type: Oil on canvas, historical painting
- Location: National Portrait Gallery, London

The House of Commons, 1793–94 is a large history painting by the Austrian artist Anton Hickel. It was first exhibited in 1795 in the Haymarket. It depicts the House of Commons of the Parliament of Great Britain around the time of the country's first involvement in the French Revolutionary Wars. It shows the Prime Minister William Pitt the Younger at the despatch box engaged in debate. A large number of other political figures of the era are also depicted including opposition Whig leader Charles James Fox.

It shows St Stephen's Chapel which functioned as the chamber of the Commons until Parliament burned down in 1834 and contains ninety seven portraits. Four future Prime Ministers Henry Addington (then Speaker of the House), Lord Liverpool, George Canning and Lord Grey are also depicted. The scene includes the Tory politicians General Sir Henry Clinton, Henry Dundas, George Rose, Admiral Sir Samuel Hood, Sir Robert Peel, Dudley Ryder, Richard Wellesley, William Wellesley-Pole and William Wilberforce and the Whigs Edmund Burke, Richard FitzPatrick, Admiral Sir John Jervis, Lord John Russell, Richard Brinsley Sheridan and Samuel Whitbread. Today it is part of the collection of the National Portrait Gallery. It was owned by the Austrian Emperor Francis I whose grandson Franz Joseph presented it to Walburga, Lady Paget the wife of the British ambassador in 1885, who immediately donated it to the National Portrait Gallery.

== See also ==
- The House of Commons, 1833, a work by George Hayter portraying the same scene forty years later

== Bibliography ==
- Carlisle, Janice. Picturing Reform in Victorian Britain. Cambridge University Press, 2012.
- Perry, Lara. History's Beauties: Women in the National Portrait Gallery, 1856-1900. Ashgate Publishing, 2006.
