= List of counties and boroughs of the unreformed House of Commons in 1800 =

This is a list of the counties and boroughs of the unreformed House of Commons.

- In the following tables, the size of the electorate is shown as it was estimated to be in about 1800. These figures are estimates only, particularly in seats which were rarely contested.
- In England, Scotland and Wales, there were 29 general elections between 1700 and the Reform Act 1832. In Ireland, there were 11 elections between the Act of Union in 1801 and 1832. The figure under "Times contested" is the number of general elections at which the seat was contested during these periods. By-elections are not counted.
- The dominant families in the counties gradually changed over time. They are shown as they were around 1800.
- Monmouthshire was an English county from its formation in 1536, although it is in most respects Welsh and was formally made part of Wales in 1974.

== English counties ==
County	Voters (1800)	Times contested	Dominant interests	Comments
Bedfordshire	2,000	14	Russell, St John	Under the dominant influence of the Duke of Bedford, head of the Russell family, Bedfordshire was a Whig stronghold.
Berkshire	3,000	11	Dundas, Neville, Vansittart	There was no single dominant family. The seats were usually shared between Tories and Whigs.
Buckinghamshire	4,000	10	Cavendish Bentinck, Grenville	The Grenvilles, led after 1821 by the Duke of Buckingham, and the Cavendish-Bentincks, led by the Duke of Portland, shared the representation. There was only one contest between 1734 and 1831.
Cambridgeshire	3,000	9	Manners, Yorke	The Tory Manners family, led by the Duke of Rutland, dominated the county until 1830, when two Whigs were elected.
Cheshire	5,000	8	Cholmondeley, Crewe, Egerton	Uncontested between 1734 and 1831, Cheshire was a Tory stronghold, the representation shared among the leading families by agreement.
Cornwall	2,700	5	Lemon, St Aubyn, Tremaine, Vyvyan	Cornwall's 21 boroughs attracted candidates from all over the country, but the county seats were rarely contested, since the Whig Lemons and the Tory Tremaines usually shared the representation.
Cumberland	4,000	6	Fletcher, Lowther	The dominant northern family, the Tory Lowthers, always controlled one seat. The other usually went to a Whig family such as the Fletchers. Contests were rare.
Derbyshire	3,000	4	Cavendish, Curzon, Mundy	The Whig Cavendish family, led by the Duke of Devonshire, always nominated one member, leaving the other to the local Tory families. As a result of this arrangement contests were very rare.
Devon	8,000	6	Acland, Bastard	Despite the large electorate, the county was not contested between 1700 and 1790, being dominated by the Tory Aclands and Bastards. The Tories were dramatically overthrown in 1831 when Lord John Russell won a seat.
Dorset	3,000	4	Chaffin, Pitt, Portman, Stangways	There was no one dominant family, although one of the members was usually a Tory Pitt. There was no contest between 1727 and 1806.
County Durham	3,500	6	Eden, Vane	Most of the local families were Whigs, and usually shared the representation among themselves, making contests rare.
Essex	6,000	12	Abdy, Bullock, Bramston	Essex was a large and wealthy county, close to the metropolis, and saw regular contests, usually when the Whig Bullocks and the Tory Bramstons could not agree on candidates.
Gloucestershire	6,000	9	Berkeley, Guise, Somerset	The Tory Somersets, led by the Duke of Beaufort, and two Whig families, the Berkeleys and their cousins the Guises, conducted a long feud in the county, which ended in an agreement in 1783 to share the representation. Thereafter there were no contests until 1832.
Hampshire	5,000	8	Heathcote, Jervoise, Thistlethwayte	The Tory Heathcotes and the Whig Jervoises and Thistlethwaytes were regular rivals, with the Whig Duke of Bedford using his influence in the county to assist his allies. But the Tories usually controlled the representation until being overthrown in 1831.
Herefordshire	3,500	8	Cornewall, Cotterell, Harley	The Whig Cornewalls and the Tory Harleys dominated the county until 1802, when the Tory Cotterells entered the fray. Thereafter the Tories usually controlled the representation.
Hertfordshire	4,000	13	Brand, Plumer, Seabright	Being close to London, Hertfordshire saw regular contests. Despite the presence of the Tory magnate the Marquess of Salisbury, the county families were mostly Whigs and after 1803 they fended off the Tories at every election.
Huntingdonshire	1,700	9	Montague	The Tory Montague family, led by the Earl of Sandwich, was the dominant force in this small county, although sometimes rival members of the same family gave the Sandwich interest trouble. Only in 1831 did the Whigs manage to win a seat.
Kent	9,000	14	Knatchbull	The Tory Knatchbulls were the leading county family, but the county's size, wealth and proximity to London made it impossible to control and there were frequent contests, often between East Kent and West Kent interests. The government, through the Admiralty's influence in the Kent ports, also had a big say.
Lancashire	8,000	5	Blackburn, Stanley	The Stanleys, led by the Earl of Derby (at this time a Whig) dominated the county. One seat was nearly always held by a Stanley relative, the other by one of the leading Tory families.
Leicestershire	6,000	7	Keck, Manners, Palmer	The representation was divided between the Tory Manners family, led by the Duke of Rutland, and local families, who were also mostly Tories.
Lincolnshire	7,000	4	Chaplin, Heathcote, Pelham	A large agricultural county, Lincolnshire had no dominant interest, but the Pelhams, relatives of the Duke of Newcastle, usually held one seat for the Whigs. The Chaplins were the leading Tory family. There was no contest between 1710 and 1806.
Middlesex	6,000	14	None	By 1800 the Middlesex electorate was more than 70% urban as the London suburbs grew, and the remaining landed families lost their influence. The county was frequently and hotly contested, with radicals such as John Wilkes, Sir Francis Burdett, 5th Baronet and Joseph Hume being elected.
Monmouthshire	1,500	4	Morgan, Somerset	The Tory Somersets, led by the Duke of Beaufort, shared the representation with the leading local Whigs, the Morgans. There were no contests after 1727.
Norfolk	7,000	8	Astley, Coke, Wodehouse	Norfolk was a large county and expensive to contest, so the Whig Astleys and Cokes and the Tory Wodehouses usually shared the representation.
Northamptonshire	3,000	5	Cartwright, Powys, Spencer	The Whig relatives of Earl Spencer were the most prominent county family, but did not dominate county politics until after 1806, when Viscount Althorp was elected. The Tory Cartwrights usually held the other seat.
Northumberland	2,000	6	Grey, Percy	The Tory Percys, led by the Duke of Northumberland, shared the representation with the Whig Greys, led by Charles Grey, who sat for the county until he became Earl Grey in 1807.
Nottinghamshire	3,000	4	Bentinck, Pierrepont	The Duke of Newcastle and the Duke of Portland, both Whigs, dominated the county until well into the 19th century, which was why there was no contest after 1722. The Newcastle seat was usually held by a Pierrepont.
Oxfordshire	4,000	4	Spencer	The Tory Spencers, family of the Duke of Marlborough, dominated the county from their seat at Blenheim Palace. One seat was usually held by a Spencer, the other by a local family acceptable to the Duke. Between 1700 and 1826 there was only one contest.
Rutland	800	7	Finch, Noel	This small county was controlled, not by the Duke of Rutland, but by local Tory families. There was no contest after 1761.
Shropshire	4,000	7	Cotes, Hill, Lyster, Powell	Shropshire was a rural county dominated by local families, mostly Tories, although the Whig Coteses sometimes held a seat.
Somerset	9,000	6	Acland, Coxe, Dickinson, Langton	Local families shared the representation, usually in a way which meant that one member came from East Somerset and one from the West. The Tory Dickinsons and the Whig Langtons were prominent.
Staffordshire	5,000	3	Leveson Gower, Littleton	There were few contests in Staffordshire, despite the county's rapid industrialisation, because the representation was shared between two Whig families, the Leveson Gowers and the Littletons.
Suffolk	5,000	7	Bunbury, Davers, Gooch	There was no dominant interest, and local families such as the Whig Bunburys and the Tory Gooches usually shared the representation.
Surrey	4,000	17	None	Being close to London and densely settled, Surrey was not open to domination by landed interests, and saw frequent contests, with the Tories usually successful until their final overthrow in 1826.
Sussex	5,000	12	Lennox, Pelham	The Pelhams, Whig relatives of the Duke of Newcastle, and the Tory Lennoxes, led by the Duke of Richmond, dominated West and East Sussex respectively, but there were frequent contests. Prime Minister Henry Pelham represented the county from 1722 to 1747.
Warwickshire	4,000	2	Dugdale, Lawley, Mordaunt	Warwickshire was contested only in 1705 and 1774. This was because of an agreement that one member should always be a Whig from Birmingham (which had no representation) and the other a Tory from a county family, usually a Mordaunt.
Westmorland	2,400	11	Lowther	The Tory Lowther family was completely dominant in the county and usually nominated both members. After 1818 there were regular contests only because Henry Brougham insisted on running against the Lowthers.
Wiltshire	5,000	5	Long, Wyndham	There was no aristocratic influence in Wiltshire and the county families, mostly Tories, amicably shared the representation.
Worcestershire	3,500	5	Foley, Lygon, Lyttleton, Ward	There were few contests in Worcestershire, because the Tory Lygons, led by Earl Beauchamp, and the Whig Foleys usually shared the representation.
Yorkshire	20,000	6	Fitzwilliam, Lascelles	Contests were surprisingly rare in England's largest and most populous county, partly because of the expense. No one family had enough influence to elect a member. Until 1784 there was an agreement between the Whigs and Tories to share the representation, but from 1784 to 1812 William Wilberforce and his personal brand of reforming Toryism dominated the county. In 1830 Henry Brougham stormed the county for the Whigs.

== English boroughs ==
In alphabetical order by county

Borough	County	Franchise type	Members	Voters in 1800	Times contested	Fate in 1832
Bedford	Bedfordshire	Freemen and inhabitant householders	2	1,200	13	Retained two seats
Abingdon	Berkshire	Scot and lot	1	260	18	Retained one seat
New Windsor	Berkshire	Scot and lot	2	300 to 400	7	Retained two seats (as Windsor)
Reading	Berkshire	Scot and lot	2	over 800	18	Retained two seats
Wallingford	Berkshire	Scot and lot	2	200	14	Retained one seat
Amersham	Buckinghamshire	Scot and lot	2	130	3	Abolished
Aylesbury	Buckinghamshire	Inhabitant householders. From 1804, freeholders in nearby areas as well.	2	500. After 1804, over 1,000	17	Retained two seats
Buckingham	Buckinghamshire	Corporation	2	13	4	Retained two seats
Chipping Wycombe	Buckinghamshire	Freemen	2	50	3	Retained two seats (as Wycombe)
Great Marlow	Buckinghamshire	Scot and lot	2	220	19	Retained two seats (as Marlow)
Wendover	Buckinghamshire	Inhabitant householders	2	150	9	Abolished
Cambridge	Cambridgeshire	Freemen	2	100	9	Retained two seats
Chester	Cheshire	Freemen	2	1,500	11	Retained two seats
Dover	Cinque Ports	Freemen	2	1,500	15	Retained two seats
Hastings	Cinque Ports	Resident freemen	2	20	7	Retained two seats
Hythe	Cinque Ports	Freemen	2	200	17	Retained one seat
New Romney	Cinque Ports	Corporation	2	15		Abolished
Rye	Cinque Ports	Scot and lot	2	15	9	Retained one seat
Sandwich	Cinque Ports	Freemen	2	700	12	Retained two seats
Seaford	Cinque Ports	Scot and lot	2	120	12	Abolished
Winchelsea	Cinque Ports	Resident freemen	2	very few	8	Abolished
Bodmin	Cornwall	Corporation	2	36	9	Retained two seats
Bossiney	Cornwall	Freemen	2	10	3	Abolished
Callington	Cornwall	Scot and lot	2	60	8	Abolished
Camelford	Cornwall	Scot and lot	2	25	4	Abolished
East Looe	Cornwall	Freemen	2	50	2	Abolished
Fowey	Cornwall	Scot and lot	2	130	8	Abolished
Grampound	Cornwall	Scot and lot	2	60	5	Disfranchised 1821
Helston	Cornwall	Corporation	2	50	6	Retained one seat
Launceston	Cornwall	Resident freemen	2	20	5	Retained one seat
Liskeard	Cornwall	Freemen	2	32	2	Retained one seat
Lostwithiel	Cornwall	Corporation	2	24	5	Abolished
Mitchell	Cornwall	Scot and lot	2	20	9	Abolished
Newport	Cornwall	Scot and lot	2	60	3	Abolished
Penryn	Cornwall	Scot and lot	2	250	17	Retained two seats (as Penryn and Falmouth)
St Germans	Cornwall	Resident householders	2	10	0	Abolished
St Ives	Cornwall	Scot and lot	2	250	17	Retained one seat
St Mawes	Cornwall	Freemen	2	20	5	Abolished
Saltash	Cornwall	Burgage holders	2	40	7	Abolished
Tregony	Cornwall	Inhabitant householders	2	200	12	Abolished
Truro	Cornwall	Corporation	2	25	6	Retained two seats
West Looe	Cornwall	Freemen	2	70	0	Abolished
Carlisle	Cumberland	Freemen	2	700	16	Retained two seats
Cockermouth	Cumberland	Burgage holders	2	200	8	Retained two seats
Derby	Derbyshire	Freemen	2	650	8	Retained two seats
Ashburton	Devon	Burgage holders	2	100	9	Retained one seat
Barnstaple	Devon	Freemen	2	500	16	Retained two seats
Bere Alston	Devon	Burgage holders	2	very few	0	Abolished
Dartmouth	Devon	Freemen	2	40	4	Retained one seat
Exeter	Devon	Freemen and freeholders	2	1,300	13	Retained two seats
Honiton	Devon	Householders	2	450	17	Retained two seats
Okehampton	Devon	Freemen and freeholders	2	250	8	Abolished
Plymouth	Devon	Freemen	2	200	6	Retained two seats
Plympton Erle	Devon	Freemen	2	50	3	Abolished
Tavistock	Devon	Freeholders	2	100	5	Retained two seats
Tiverton	Devon	Corporation	2	24	2	Retained two seats
Totnes	Devon	Freemen	2	80	11	Retained two seats
Bridport	Dorset	Scot and lot	2	250	15	Retained two seats
Corfe Castle	Dorset	Scot and lot	2	50	2	Abolished
Dorchester	Dorset	Ratepayers	2	200	10	Retained two seats
Lyme Regis	Dorset	Freemen	2	40	8	Retained one seat
Poole	Dorset	Freemen	2	120	8	Retained two seats
Shaftesbury	Dorset	Scot and lot	2	350	18	Retained one seat
Wareham	Dorset	Scot and lot	2	120	5	Retained one seat
Weymouth and Melcombe Regis	Dorset	Freeholders	4	600	14	Retained two seats
Durham	County Durham	Freemen	2	1,000	9	Retained two seats
Colchester	Essex	Freemen	2	1,400	23	Retained two seats
Harwich	Essex	Corporation	2	32	5	Retained two seats
Maldon	Essex	Freemen	2	150 until 1810, 1,500 after	14	Retained two seats
Bristol	Gloucestershire	Freemen and freeholders	2	5,000	19	Retained two seats
Cirencester	Gloucestershire	Householders	2	600	15	Retained two seats
Gloucester	Gloucestershire	Freemen	2	2,000	14	Retained two seats
Tewkesbury	Gloucestershire	Freemen and freeholders	2	500	8	Retained two seats
Andover	Hampshire	Corporation	2	24	9	Retained two seats
Christchurch	Hampshire	Corporation	2	24	5	Retained one seat
Lymington	Hampshire	Freemen	2	20	2	Retained two seats
Newport	Hampshire	Corporation	2	24	3	Retained two seats
Newtown	Hampshire	Burgage holders	2	39	2	Abolished
Petersfield	Hampshire	Burgage holders	2	50	8	Retained one seat
Portsmouth	Hampshire	Freemen	2	100	7	Retained two seats
Southampton	Hampshire	Scot and lot	2	700	14	Retained two seats
Stockbridge	Hampshire	Scot and lot	2	140	9	Abolished
Whitchurch	Hampshire	Burgage holders	2	70	6	Abolished
Winchester	Hampshire	Freemen	2	100	8	Retained two seats
Yarmouth	Hampshire	Corporation	2	21	2	Abolished
Hereford	Herefordshire	Freemen	2	1,000	14	Retained two seats
Leominster	Herefordshire	Scot and lot	2	600	20	Retained two seats
Weobley	Herefordshire	Burgage holders	2	100	8	Abolished
Hertford	Hertfordshire	Freemen	2	600	12	Retained two seats
St Albans	Hertfordshire	Freemen	2	600	19	Retained two seats
Huntingdon	Huntingdonshire	Freemen	2	200	8	Retained two seats
Canterbury	Kent	Freemen	2	1,700	23	Retained two seats
Maidstone	Kent	Freemen	2	700	28	Retained two seats
Queenborough	Kent	Freemen	2	150	15	Abolished
Rochester	Kent	Freemen	2	700	22	Retained two seats
Clitheroe	Lancashire	Burgage holders	2	102	5	Retained one seat
Lancaster	Lancashire	Freemen	2	2,000	10	Retained two seats
Liverpool	Lancashire	Freemen	2	3,000	24	Retained two seats
Newton	Lancashire	Freemen	2	50	0	Abolished
Preston	Lancashire	Freemen until 1768, inhabitants thereafter	2	2,000	16	Retained two seats
Wigan	Lancashire	Freemen	2	100	10	Retained two seats
Leicester	Leicestershire	Scot and lot	2	2,500	13	Retained two seats
Boston	Lincolnshire	Scot and lot	2	500	16	Retained two seats
Grantham	Lincolnshire	Freemen	2	800	12	Retained two seats
Great Grimsby	Lincolnshire	Resident freemen	2	300	21	Retained one seat
Lincoln	Lincolnshire	Freemen	2	1,200	19	Retained two seats
Stamford	Lincolnshire	Scot and lot	2	650	6	Retained two seats
London	Middlesex	Freemen	4	10,000	27	Retained four seats
Westminster	Middlesex	Scot and lot	2	12,000	19	Retained two seats
Monmouth Boroughs (Monmouth, Newport, Usk)	Monmouthshire	Freemen	1	800	3	Retained one seat
Castle Rising	Norfolk	Burgage holders	2	50	1	Abolished
Great Yarmouth	Norfolk	Freemen	2	1,200	19	Retained two seats
King's Lynn	Norfolk	Freeman	2	300	5	Retained two seats
Norwich	Norfolk	Freemen and freeholders	2	3,000	23	Retained two seats
Thetford	Norfolk	Corporation	2	31	3	Retained two seats
Brackley	Northamptonshire	Corporation	2	33	6	Abolished
Higham Ferrers	Northamptonshire	Freemen	1	50	1	Abolished
Northampton	Northamptonshire	Householders	2	1,000	16	Retained two seats
Peterborough	Northamptonshire	Scot and lot	2	400	7	Retained two seats
Berwick-upon-Tweed	Northumberland	Freemen	2	1,000	14	Retained two seats
Morpeth	Northumberland	Freemen	2	200	8	Retained one seat
Newcastle-upon-Tyne	Northumberland	Freemen	2	2,500	9	Retained two seats
East Retford	Nottinghamshire	Freemen	2	160	15	Seats transferred to Bassetlaw in 1827, retained two seats in 1832.
Newark-on-Trent	Nottinghamshire	Scot and lot	2	1,000	15	Retained two seats
Nottingham	Nottinghamshire	Freemen and freeholders	2	4,000	22	Retained two seats
Banbury	Oxfordshire	Corporation	1	18	5	Retained one seat
New Woodstock	Oxfordshire	Freemen	2	180	9	Retained one seat (as Woodstock)
Oxford	Oxfordshire	Freemen	2	1,400	14	Retained two seats
Bishop's Castle	Shropshire	Resident freemen	2	170	12	Abolished
Bridgnorth	Shropshire	Freemen	2	700	9	Retained two seats
Ludlow	Shropshire	Freemen	2	500	9	Retained two seats
Shrewsbury	Shropshire	Scot and lot	2	750	17	Retained two seats
Wenlock	Shropshire	Resident freemen	2	400	3	Retained two seats
Bath	Somerset	Corporation	2	30	16	Retained two seats
Bridgwater	Somerset	Scot and lot	2	350	16	Retained two seats
Ilchester	Somerset	Householders	2	100	16	Abolished
Milborne Port	Somerset	Scot and lot	2	100	15	Abolished
Minehead	Somerset	Householders	2	300	10	Abolished
Taunton	Somerset	Householders	2	500	15	Retained two seats
Wells	Somerset	Freemen	2	250	12	Retained two seats
Lichfield	Staffordshire	Scot and lot	2	700	10	Retained two seats
Newcastle-under-Lyme	Staffordshire	Resident freemen	2	700	16	Retained two seats
Stafford	Staffordshire	Resident freemen	2	600	15	Retained two seats
Tamworth	Staffordshire	Scot and lot	2	350	11	Retained two seats
Aldeburgh	Suffolk	Freemen	2	80	4	Abolished
Bury St Edmunds	Suffolk	Corporation	2	17	11	Retained two seats
Dunwich	Suffolk	Freemen	2	32	5	Abolished
Eye	Suffolk	Scot and lot	2	200	2	Retained one seat
Ipswich	Suffolk	Freemen	2	700	21	Retained two seats
Orford	Suffolk	Freemen	2	20	7	Abolished
Sudbury	Suffolk	Freemen	2	750	22	Retained two seats
Bletchingley	Surrey	Burgage holders	2	90	2	Abolished
Gatton	Surrey	Scot and lot	2	7	1	Abolished
Guildford	Surrey	Scot and lot	2	150	14	Retained two seats
Haslemere	Surrey	Resident freeholders	2	65	13	Abolished
Reigate	Surrey	Freeholders	2	200	5	Retained one seat
Southwark	Surrey	Scot and lot	2	2,500	24	Retained two seats
Arundel	Sussex	Scot and lot	2	300	9	Retained one seat
Bramber	Sussex	Burgage holders	2	36	8	Abolished
Chichester	Sussex	Scot and lot	2	600	12	Retained two seats
East Grinstead	Sussex	Burgage holders	2	36	5	Abolished
Horsham	Sussex	Burgage holders	2	70	9	Retained one seat
Lewes	Sussex	Scot and lot	2	300	16	Retained two seats
Midhurst	Sussex	Burgage holders	2	118	2	Retained one seat
New Shoreham	Sussex	40 shilling freeholders	2	1,000	13	Retained two seats
Steyning	Sussex	Scot and lot	2	150	10	Abolished
Coventry	Warwickshire	Freemen	2	2,700	25	Retained two seats
Warwick	Warwickshire	Ratepayers	2	500	8	Retained two seats
Appleby	Westmorland	Burgage holders	2	200	6	Abolished
Calne	Wiltshire	Corporation	2	17	9	Retained one seat
Chippenham	Wiltshire	Burgage holders	2	129	12	Retained two seats
Cricklade	Wiltshire	Freeholders (in five adjacent hundreds)	2	1,200	19	Retained two seats
Devizes	Wiltshire	Corporation	2	35	7	Retained two seats
Downton	Wiltshire	Burgage holders	2	100	6	Abolished
Great Bedwyn	Wiltshire	Freeholders	2	120	8	Abolished
Heytesbury	Wiltshire	Burgage holders	2	26	2	Abolished
Hindon	Wiltshire	Householders	2	200	12	Abolished
Ludgershall	Wiltshire	Freeholders	2	100	7	Abolished
Malmesbury	Wiltshire	Corporation	2	13	10	Retained one seat
Marlborough	Wiltshire	Corporation	2	12	7	Retained two seats
Old Sarum	Wiltshire	Burgage holders	2	10	2	Abolished
Salisbury	Wiltshire	Corporation	2	54	10	Retained two seats
Westbury	Wiltshire	Burgage holders	2	70	9	Retained one seat
Wilton	Wiltshire	Corporation	2	20	3	Retained one seat
Wootton Bassett	Wiltshire	Scot and lot	2	250	15	Abolished
Bewdley	Worcestershire	Freemen	1	13	7	Retained one seat
Droitwich	Worcestershire	Corporation	2	25	1	Retained one seat
Evesham	Worcestershire	Freemen	2	700	19	Retained two seats
Worcester	Worcestershire	Freemen	2	2,000	19	Retained two seats
Aldborough	Yorkshire	Scot and lot	2	60	3	Abolished
Beverley	Yorkshire	Freemen	2	1,400	19	Retained two seats
Boroughbridge	Yorkshire	Burgage holders	2	64	6	Abolished
Hedon	Yorkshire	Freemen	2	200	10	Abolished
Kingston upon Hull	Yorkshire	Freemen	2	2,000	17	Retained two seats
Knaresborough	Yorkshire	Burgage holders	2	96	3	Retained two seats
Malton	Yorkshire	Scot and lot	2	500	4	Retained two seats
Northallerton	Yorkshire	Burgage holders	2	200	2	Retained one seat
Pontefract	Yorkshire	Householders	2	600	15	Retained two seats
Richmond	Yorkshire	Burgage holders	2	270	4	Retained two seats
Ripon	Yorkshire	Burgage holders	2	146	2	Retained two seats
Scarborough	Yorkshire	Corporation	2	40	8	Retained two seats
Thirsk	Yorkshire	Burgage holders	2	50	0	Retained one seat
York	Yorkshire	Freemen	2	2,500	12	Retained two seats

== Welsh counties ==
County	Voters in 1800	Times contested	Dominant interests	Comments
Anglesey	700	2	Paget	Anglesey was effectively controlled by the Whig Paget family, led by the Earl of Uxbridge.
Brecknockshire	1,700	3	Morgan, Wood	The long-dominant Morgan family, absentee landlords from Tredegar, were displaced in 1806 by the Tory Wood family, who thereafter held the seat with little opposition.
Cardiganshire	1,000	2	Johnes, Powell	The Whig Johnes family were displaced by the Tory Powells in 1816. There was no contest after 1741.
Carmarthenshire	2,500	3	Rice, Seymour, Vaughan	The seat was passed around among several local families, all Tories, until a Whig breakthrough in 1831.
Carnarvonshire	1,100	3	Williams, Wynn	Two local families, the Whig Williamses and the Tory Wynnes, vied for control. Sir Robert Williams held the seat for 36 years from 1790.
Denbighshire	2,000	1	Williams Wynn	The Whig Williams Wynn family had unchallenged control of the representation. Sir Watkin Williams Wynn held the seat from 1796 to 1840.
Flintshire	1,000	1	Mostyn	The Whig Mostyn family controlled the seat all through the 18th century, and were not defeated until 1837.
Glamorganshire	2,000	2	Morgan, Stuart	Glamorgan was the richest county in Wales and the most difficult to control. The Tory Stuarts, the family of the Marquess of Bute, had extensive interests in the county, and supported Tory members such as Thomas Wyndham, MP from 1789 to 1814.
Merionethshire	1,000	0	Vaughan	The Tory Vaughans held the seat without opposition through the entire 18th century and were not displaced until 1836.
Montgomeryshire	1,400	1	Mostyn, Williams Wynn	The county was not contested between 1700 and 1836. The Williams Wynn family (who in Montgomeryshire were Tories) held the seat without challenge from 1795.
Pembrokeshire	3,000	3	Owen, Phillipps	The Tory Owens and the Whig Phillippses, led by Baron Milford, vied for control of the representation. Sir John Owen won the seat in 1812 and held it until 1841.
Radnorshire	1,000	3	Johnes, Wilkins	Two Whig families, the Johneses and the Wilkinses, succeeded each other in the representation.

== Welsh boroughs ==
Borough	County	Franchise type	Members	Voters in 1800	Times contested	Fate in 1832
Beaumaris	Anglesey	Corporation	1	24	0	Retained one seat
Brecon	Brecknockshire	Freemen	1	12	0	Retained one seat
Caernarvon Boroughs (Caernarvon, Conway, Criccieth, Nevin, Pwllheli)	Caernarvonshire	Freemen	1	700	2	Retained one seat
Cardiff Boroughs (Aberavon, Cardiff, Cowbridge, Kenfig, Llantrisant, Loughor, Neath, Swansea)	Glamorganshire	Freemen	1	800	2	Retained one seat
Cardigan Boroughs (Aberystwyth, Cardigan, Lampeter)	Cardiganshire	Freemen	1	2,500	3	Retained one seat
Carmarthen	Carmarthenshire	Freemen	1	500	5	Retained one seat
Denbigh Boroughs (Denbigh, Holt, Ruthin)	Denbighshire	Freemen	1	24	4	Retained one seat
Flint Boroughs (Caergwrle, Caerwys, Flint, Overton, Rhuddlan)	Flintshire	Scot and lot	1	600	3	Retained one seat
Haverfordwest	Pembrokeshire	Scot and lot	1	500	3	Retained one seat
Montgomery	Montgomeryshire	Freemen	1	500	1	Retained one seat
New Radnor Boroughs (Cefnllys, Cnwclas, Knighton, New Radnor, Rhayader)	Radnorshire	Freemen	1	1,000	4	Retained one seat
Pembroke Boroughs (Pembroke, Tenby, Wiston)	Pembrokeshire	Freemen	1	500	2	Retained one seat

== Scottish counties ==
County	Voters in 1800	Times contested	Dominant interests	Comments	Fate in 1832
Aberdeenshire	140	5	Gordon	The Tory Dukes of Gordon were the dominant interest in the county, retaining control through the creation of fictitious or "parchment" voters.	Retained one seat
Argyllshire	45	0	Campbell	The control of the Dukes of Argyll, who until the 1830s were Whigs, was complete and unchallenged.	Retained one seat
Ayrshire	140	1	Fergusson, Montgomerie	Ayrshire had a large electorate by Scottish standards, and several local families vied for control. Chief of these were the Tory Montgomeries, led by the Earl of Eglinton.	Retained one seat
Banffshire	35	1	Duff, Grant	The Duff family of the Earl of Fife were the strongest influence in the county - Fife (who was technically an Irish peer) sat for the seat himself, then handed it over to his natural son. Later Sir William Grant supplanted the Fife influence.	Retained one seat
Berwickshire	120	2	Home, Hume-Campbell	A long rivalry between the Homes and Humes ended in 1784, and thereafter several local Tory families competed for support. The county did not elect a Whig until 1832.	Retained one seat
Buteshire and Caithness	Buteshire 15, Caithness 20	0	Stuart in Bute, Sinclair in Caithness	These two small counties returned members at alternate elections. The Tory Stuarts, led by the Earl of Bute, controlled Bute, while the Whig Sinclairs dominated Caithness (and still do: John Thurso, the member for Caithness, Sutherland and Easter Ross from 2001 until 2015, is a Sinclair).	Bute and Caithness were given one seat each.
Clackmannanshire and Kinross-shire	Clackmannan 15, Kinross 15	0	Abercromby in Clackmannanshire, Graham in Kinross	These two small counties returned members at alternate elections. The Whig Abercrombys controlled Clackmannan while the Tory Grahams controlled Kinross. There were no contests.	Retained one seat between them
Cromartyshire and Nairnshire	Cromarty 10, Nairn 20	2	Macleod in Cromarty, Brodie and Campbell in Nairn	These two small counties returned members at alternate elections, tiny Cromarty always struggling to find any voters at all. The Whig Campbells dominated Nairn from the 1760s to the 1830s.	Cromarty was paired with Ross-shire and given one seat, while Nairn was paired with Elgin and given one seat.
Dumfriesshire	60	1	Douglas	The Douglas family of the Duke of Queensberry were the dominant force in this their home county, but did not usually represent the county themselves, rather supporting government nominees.	Retained one seat
Dunbartonshire	50	5	Campbell, Elphinstone, Graham	The Duke of Argyll and the Grahams led by the Duke of Montrose both had an interest in the county, which they used to install relatives and supporters, causing more contests than usual in a Scottish county.	Retained one seat
Edinburghshire (or Midlothian)	100	2	Dundas	The Dundas family, led by the Tory party's Scottish manager Henry Dundas, had complete control of the county. Dundas held the seat himself from 1774 to 1790, when he was succeeded by his son.	Retained one seat
Elginshire (or Morayshire)	40	1	Grant	The Tory Grant family monopolised the representation all through the 18th century, and usually nominated family members.	Retained one seat, with Nairnshire
Fifeshire	160	4	None	Fife was one of the largest and wealthiest counties, and there were no dominant local interests. The government, represented by Henry Dundas, was usually able to muster enough support for the Tory nominee, but in 1820 the Whigs won the seat and generally retained it thereafter.	Retained one seat
Forfarshire (or Angus)	100	1	Douglas, Maule	The Whig Maule family, led by the Earls of Panmure, dominated the representation from the 1740s to 1831.	Retained one seat
Haddingtonshire (or East Lothian)	70	2	Hamilton	The Hamilton family led by the Earl of Haddington had a strong but not controlling interest in the county. The government, represented by Henry Dundas, was often able to nominate the member, including Dundas's brother-in-law.	Retained one seat
Inverness-shire	50	1	Fraser, Gordon, Grant	Inverness was a large county and difficult to control, particularly since the Fraser clan created many "parchment" voters to support their claims. From 1802, however, the Tory Grants dominated the county.	Retained one seat
Kincardineshire	40	4	Adam, Drummond, Irvine	There was no dominant influence in the county, and the represented by Henry Dundas, controlled the representation until 1806, when a Whig was elected.	Retained one seat
Kirkcudbright Stewartry (or Kirkcudbrightshire)	140	3	Murray, Stewart	The Stewarts, led by the Earl of Galloway, were the most influential family, but rarely nominated family members, instead bargaining with Henry Dundas for government favours in exchange for supporting his nominee. The seat fell to the Whigs in 1826.	Retained one seat
Lanarkshire	100	8	Hamilton	The Duke of Hamilton was the dominant influence in the county, and from 1802 he installed his son, a Whig, in the seat. The Tories were unable to regain the seat until 1830.	Retained one seat
Linlithgowshire (or West Lothian)	60	3	Hope	In 1790 the Tory manager Henry Dundas installed his brother-in-law John Hope in the seat, and the Hopes then held it without a break until 1847.	Retained one seat
Orkney and Shetland	26	3	Balfour, Dundas, Honyman	The Dundas family influence was strong but not enough to shut out the rival Balfour and Honyman interests, leading to several contests. The Whigs won the seat in 1826.	Retained one seat
Peeblesshire	38	0	Douglas, Montogomery	The Dukes of Queensberry had a controlling interest, and allowed their friends the Montgomerys to sit as Tory members from 1768 to 1832.	Retained one seat
Perthshire	150	7	Murray	The Murray family led by the Duke of Atholl were the dominant influence, but the relatively large electorate made the county difficult to control for the Tories. The sitting member was usually a Murray or a related Drummond.	Retained one seat
Renfrewshire	80	3	McDowell, Stewart	The county was dominated by the rivalry between the Whig Stewarts and the Tory McDowells, who had the powerful support of the Tory manager Henry Dundas. Nevertheless, the Whigs usually held the seat.	Retained one seat
Ross-shire	70	2	Mackenzie, Ross	The Whig Mackenzies, led by the Earl of Seaforth, were the leading family, but the Tory Rosses won the seat in 1796, and the Tories then held it until 1831.	Retained one seat, paired with Cromarty
Roxburghshire	120	3	Elliot, Ker, Scott	The Whig Elliot family dominated the representation, although the Tory Scotts, led by the Duke of Buccleuch, were frequent challengers.	Retained one seat
Selkirkshire	40	0	Scott	the Tory Scotts, led by the Duke of Buccleuch, controlled the county, and their nominees held the seat until 1832.	Retained one seat
Stirlingshire	80	4	Dundas, Hamilton	The Stirlingshire Dundases were Whigs and enabled the Whigs to hold the seat until 1812, when the Tories won with the support of the Duke of Hamilton.	Retained one seat
Sutherlandshire	25	1	Leveson-Gower	The Duke of Sutherland owned most of the county and his influence, placed at the service of the government, was unchallengeable.	Retained one seat
Wigtownshire	50	2	Stewart	The Stewarts, led by the Earl of Galloway, were the most influential family, and usually supported Tories. The Whigs won the seat in 1830.	Retained one seat

== Scottish burghs ==
Borough	County	Members	Times contested	Fate in 1832
Aberdeen Burghs (Aberdeen, Arbroath, Brechin, Inverbervie, Montrose)	Aberdeenshire, Forfarshire, Kincardineshire	1	1	Aberdeen was given one seat, the other burghs retained one seat as Montrose Burghs.
Anstruther Burghs (Anstruther Easter, Anstruther Wester, Crail, Kilrenny, Pittenweem)	Fifeshire	1	1	Abolished
Ayr Burghs (Ayr, Campbeltown, Inverary, Irvine, Rothesay)	Argyllshire, Ayrshire, Buteshire	1	0	Retained one seat
Dumfries Burghs (Annan, Kirkcudbright, Lochmaben, Sanquhar)	Dumfriesshire, Kirkcudbrightshire	1	1	Retained one seat
Dysart Burghs (Burntisland, Dysart, Kinghorn, Kirkcaldy)	Fifeshire	1	2	Retained one seat
Edinburgh	Edinburghshire	1	3	Given two seats
Elgin Burghs (Banff, Cullen, Elgin, Inverurie, Kintore)	Aberdeenshire, Banffshire, Elginshire	1	1	Retained one seat
Glasgow Burghs (Dumbarton, Glasgow, Renfrew, Rutherglen)	Dunbartonshire, Lanarkshire, Renfrewshire	1		Abolished: Glasgow was given two seats in its own right.
Haddington Burghs (Dunbar, Haddington, Jedburgh, Lauder, North Berwick)	Berwickshire, Haddingtonshire, Roxburghshire	1	3	Retained one seat
Inverness Burghs (Forres, Fortrose, Inverness, Nairn)	Inverness-shire, Nairnshire, Ross-shire	1	1	Retained one seat
Linlithgow Burghs (Lanark, Linlithgow, Peebles, Selkirk)	Lanarkshire, Linlithgowshire, Peeblesshire, Selkirkshire	1	2	Retained one seat as Falkirk Burghs
Perth Burghs (Cupar, Dundee, Forfar, Perth, St Andrews)	Fifeshire, Forfarshire, Perthshire	1	1	Dundee and Perth were given one seat each, the other burghs retained one seat as St Andrews Burghs.
Stirling Burghs (Culross, Inverkeithing, Queensferry, Stirling)	Fifeshire, Linlithgowshire, Perthshire, Stirlingshire	1	3	Retained one seat
Tain Burghs (or Northern Burghs) (Dingwall, Dornoch, Kirkwall, Tain, Wick)	Caithness, Orkney, Ross-shire, Sutherlandshire	1	2	Retained one seat
Wigtown Burghs (New Galloway, Stranraer, Whithorn, Wigtown)	Kirkcudbrightshire, Wigtownshire	1	2	Retained one seat

== Irish counties ==
County	Voters in 1800	Times contested	Dominant interests	Comments
County Antrim	8,000	1	O'Neill, Seymour	The O'Neills, led by Earl O'Neill, and the Seymours led by the Earl of Hertford, were the leading families of the county, and since both were Tories they usually agreed to share the representation.
County Armagh	6,000	2	Acheson, Brownlow, Caulfeild	The Tory Achesons (led by Earl Gosford) and Brownlows generally shared the representation with the Whig Caulfeilds (led by the Earl of Charlemont).
County Carlow	4,000	1	Kavanagh, Latouche	The Kavanaghs were the most influential family, but as Catholics could not be elected, so they supported the Whig Latouches. In 1812, however, Thomas Kavanagh converted to both Protestantism and Toryism, and the county remained Tory until 1835.
County Cavan	4,000	3	Maxwell	The Tory Maxwells, led by the Earl of Farnham, were the strongest influence in the county. One seat was usually held by a Maxwell relative, the other by other local families, also Tories, until a Whig breakthrough in 1826.
County Clare	6,000	5	Burton, Fitzgerald, O'Brien	Clare had a large and turbulent electorate, and no one interest was strong enough to control it. Various branches of the O'Briens had great prestige. Until 1828 they shared the representation with the Burtons and Fitzgeralds. In that year Daniel O'Connell, the Catholic leader, won two famous by-elections, forcing the pace of Catholic Emancipation.
County Cork	7,000	1	Bernard, Boyle, King	Cork was a large county with many landed interests, the most important being the Boyle family, led by the Earl of Shannon, who controlled the representation until 1812 and generally supported the Tory government. After 1812 the Duke of Devonshire used his influence to support the Whigs, who won both seats in 1830.
County Donegal	6,000	2	Conyngham, Hamilton, Montgomery	Donegal was dominated by rivalry between the Tory Hamiltons, led by the Marquess of Abercorn, and the Whig Conynghams led by the Marquess of Conyngham. After 1812 they shared the representation.
County Down	13,000	4	Hill, Stewart	Down was dominated the Whig Hill family, led by the Marquess of Downshire, and the Tory Stewarts, led by the Marquess of Londonderry and his son Viscount Castlereagh, the Foreign Secretary, who held the seat until 1821. The other member was nearly always a Hill.
County Dublin	900	8	Hamilton, Talbot, White	Dublin was a small county without large landed interests, and both the government and the Church of Ireland influenced elections. Whigs and Tories shared the representation until 1826, when the Whigs won both seats.
County Fermanagh	7,000	5	Archdall, Brooke, Cole	Fear of the Catholic majority made all the leading interests firm Tories, and Protestant families such as the Coles, led by the Earl of Enniskillen, dominated the representation.
County Galway	13,000	4	De Burgh, Martin, Trench	A large and poor Catholic county, Galway was dominated by large Protestant landowners, led by the de Burgh family of the Earl of Clanricarde and Trench family, created Earls of Clancarty in 1803. The county was firmly Tory until 1830.
County Kerry	5,000	3	Browne, Crosbie, Mullins	The largest landowner in Kerry was the Catholic Earl of Kenmare, who used his influence in support of the Whig Maurice Fitzgerald, who held the seat until 1831. The Protestant Crosbies (the Earls of Glandore) usually nominated the other member.
County Kildare	2,000	1	FitzGerald, Latouche	The FitzGerald family, headed by the Duke of Leinster, owned about one-fifth of the county, and used this influence to nominate one member. The other member was usually a Latouche. Both families were Whigs.
County Kilkenny	2,000	2	Butler, Ponsonby	Two families dominated Kilkenny politics, the Butlers (Earls of Ormonde) and the Ponsonbys (Earls of Bessborough). Both families were Whigs, and they shared the representation.
King's County	2,000	1	Parsons	The Tory Parsons family, headed by the Earl of Rosse, were the dominant interest in the county, and kept it safely Tory until 1826.
County Leitrim	5,000	5	Clements, Latouche, White	The Tory Clements family, led by the Earl of Leitrim, were the strongest influence in the county, and usually nominated a family member to one of the seats. The Whig Latouches and Whites usually filled the other seat.
County Limerick	8,500	5	FitzGibbon, Odell, O'Grady	The Whig FitzGibbons, led by the Earl of Clare, were the largest, but far from dominant, interest in the county. The FitzGibbons usually filled one seat, while the other county families, some of them Tories, held the other.
County Londonderry	8,500	2	Beresford, Stewart	Two Tory Protestant families, the Stewarts, led by the Marquess of Londonderry, and the Beresfords, led by the Marquess of Waterford, dominated the county, and usually shared the representation.
County Longford	3,000	2	Parsons	The Tory Parsons family, headed by the Earl of Rosse, were the dominant interest in the county, and used their position to support Tory members such as Sir Thomas Fetherston.
County Louth	600	2	Foster	The Tory Foster family were the most powerful influence in this small county, and kept both seats in Tory hands until 1826.
County Mayo	12,000	4	Browne	The Tory Browne family headed by the Marquess of Sligo and the Whig Dillon family headed by Viscount Dillon were the leading influences in this large Catholic county. They usually shared the representation.
County Meath	4,300	2	Bligh, Somerville, Taylour	The county was dominated by Whig families, of which the Taylours (led by the Marquess of Headfort) were the most important and usually controlled one seat. Sir Marcus Somerville held the other from 1801 to 1831.
County Monaghan	3,500	2	Dawson, Leslie, Westenra	The Dawson family, led by Baron Cremorne, who were politically independent, usually shared the representation with the Tory Leslies. The Whig Westenras (Baron Rossmore) won a seat from 1818.
Queen's County	6,000	3	Parnell, Wellesley Pole	The Tory Wellesley Poles, relatives of the Duke of Wellington, nearly always held one seat. The Whig Parnells held the other from 1806.
County Roscommon	6,000	1	French, King, Mahon	The King family, headed by the Earl of Kingston, were the largest interest, although they seldom contested the seats themselves, instead supporting their close Whig allies, the Frenches and Mahons.
County Sligo	2,000	0	Cooper, O'Hara, Temple	There was no dominant interest in this poor and Catholic county. Two local families, the Tory Coopers and the Whig O'Haras, shared the representation until 1823, when the King family, headed by the Earl of Kingston, intervened.
County Tipperary	18,000	4	Bagwell, Caher, Mathew, Prittie	Two Whig families, the Mathews, led by the Earl Landaff, and the Pritties, shared the representation until 1818, when they were challenged by the Tory Bagwells and Cahers.
County Tyrone	20,000	0	Lowry-Corrie, Stewart	The Tory Hamiltons, led by the Marquess of Abercorn, used their influence in support of the Lowry-Corries (related to the Earl of Belmore), who usually held one of the seats. The Whig Stewart family held the other seat until 1835.
County Waterford	3,300	4	Cavendish	The Whig Cavendish family, led by the Duke of Devonshire, were the leading landowners in the county, but as non-residents their influence was limited. They usually nominated one member, while the local Tory Beresfords nominated the other
County Westmeath	3,000	3	Pakenham, Rochfort, Smyth	All the leading local families were Tories - the Rochforts (Earls of Belvidere), the Pakenhams (Earls of Longford) and the Smyths. These three families dominated the representation until 1830.
County Wexford	7,500	5	Alcock, Carew, Loftus, Ram	The Loftus family led by the Marquess of Ely were the largest interest in the county, but after 1806 they did not represent the county themselves. The Tory Alock and Ram families held the seats until 1812, but later the Whig Carews gained the upper hand.
County Wicklow	3,000	0	Fitzwilliam	The Whig Earl Fitzwilliam was landlord to about half the county's voters and his influence was dominant. He directly nominated one member and had a right of veto over the other.

== Irish boroughs ==
Borough	County	Franchise type	Members	Voters in 1800	Times contested	Fate in 1832
Armagh	Armagh	Corporation	1	13	0	Retained one seat
Athlone	Westmeath	Freemen	1	80	0	Retained one seat
Bandon Bridge	Cork	Corporation	1	13	0	Retained one seat
Belfast	Antrim	Corporation	1	13	0	Given two seats
Carlow	Carlow	Corporation	1	13	0	Retained one seat
Carrickfergus	Antrim	Freemen	1	800	5	Retained one seat
Cashel	Tipperary	Freemen	1	20	0	Retained one seat
Clonmel	Tipperary	Freemen	1	90	0	Retained one seat
Coleraine	Londonderry	Freemen	1	40	0	Retained one seat
Cork	Cork	Freemen	2	1,700	6	Retained two seats
Downpatrick	Down	5 pound householders	1	300	6	Retained one seat
Drogheda	Louth	Freemen	1	600	6	Retained one seat
Dublin	Dublin	Freemen	2	3,000	5	Retained two seats
Dundalk	Louth	Freemen	1	30	0	Retained one seat
Dungannon	Tyrone	Corporation	1	13	0	Retained one seat
Dungarvan	Waterford	5 pound householders	1	250	2	Retained one seat
Ennis	Clare	Corporation	1	13	0	Retained one seat
Enniskillen	Fermanagh	Freemen	1	14	0	Retained one seat
Galway	Galway	Freemen	1	500	4	Given two seats
Kilkenny	Kilkenny	Freemen	1	1,200	4	Retained one seat
Kinsale	Cork	Freemen	1	176	1	Retained one seat
Limerick	Limerick	Freemen	1	1,000	4	Given two seats
Lisburn	Antrim	5 pound householders	1	75	0	Retained one seat
Londonderry	Londonderry	Freemen	1	1,000	2	Retained one seat
Mallow	Cork	40 shilling freeholders	1	524	2	Retained one seat
New Ross	Wexford	Freemen	1	38	0	Retained one seat
Newry	Down	5 pound householders	1	500	4	Retained one seat
Portarlington	Queen's	Freemen	1	12	0	Retained one seat
Sligo	Sligo	Corporation	1	13	0	Retained one seat
Tralee	Kerry	Corporation	1	13	0	Retained one seat
Waterford	Waterford	Freemen	1	1,000	2	Given two seats
Wexford	Wexford	Freemen	1	150	1	Retained one seat
Youghal	Cork	Freemen	1	263	0	Retained one seat

== University seats ==
University	Franchise type	Members	Voters in 1800	Times contested	Fate in 1832
Cambridge University	Holders of doctoral and master's degrees	2	800	8	Retained two seats
Dublin University	Provost, fellows and foundation scholars	1	70	5	Given two seats
Oxford University	Holders of doctoral and master's degrees	2	1,100	2	Retained two seats
