= Anton Hickel =

Austrian artist (1745–1798)

Karl Anton Hickel (Czech: Antonín Hickel; 1745 – 30 October 1798) was an Austrian painter.

== Life ==
Hickel was born in Česká Lípa, Bohemia, and enrolled in the Academy of Fine Arts Vienna in Vienna, Austria in 1758. After graduation, he worked as a painter under his brother, Joseph Hickel, who was also a painter. Beginning in 1779, he served as a traveling portrait painter. He spent considerable time in Munich where he painted Charles Theodore, Elector of Bavaria, among others. He then traveled in southern Germany, Switzerland, then to Mannheim and Mainz. He moved to Switzerland in 1785, and then became the official court painter of Joseph II, Holy Roman Emperor. In 1786, he travelled to France where he painted under the patronage of Marie Antoinette and Marie-Louise, princesse de Lamballe. He died in Hamburg.

In London in the 1790s, he painted the large The House of Commons, 1793–94, first exhibited in 1795 and now in the National Portrait Gallery. He painted portraits of leading British politicians such as Charles James Fox and William Wilberforce.

== Gallery ==
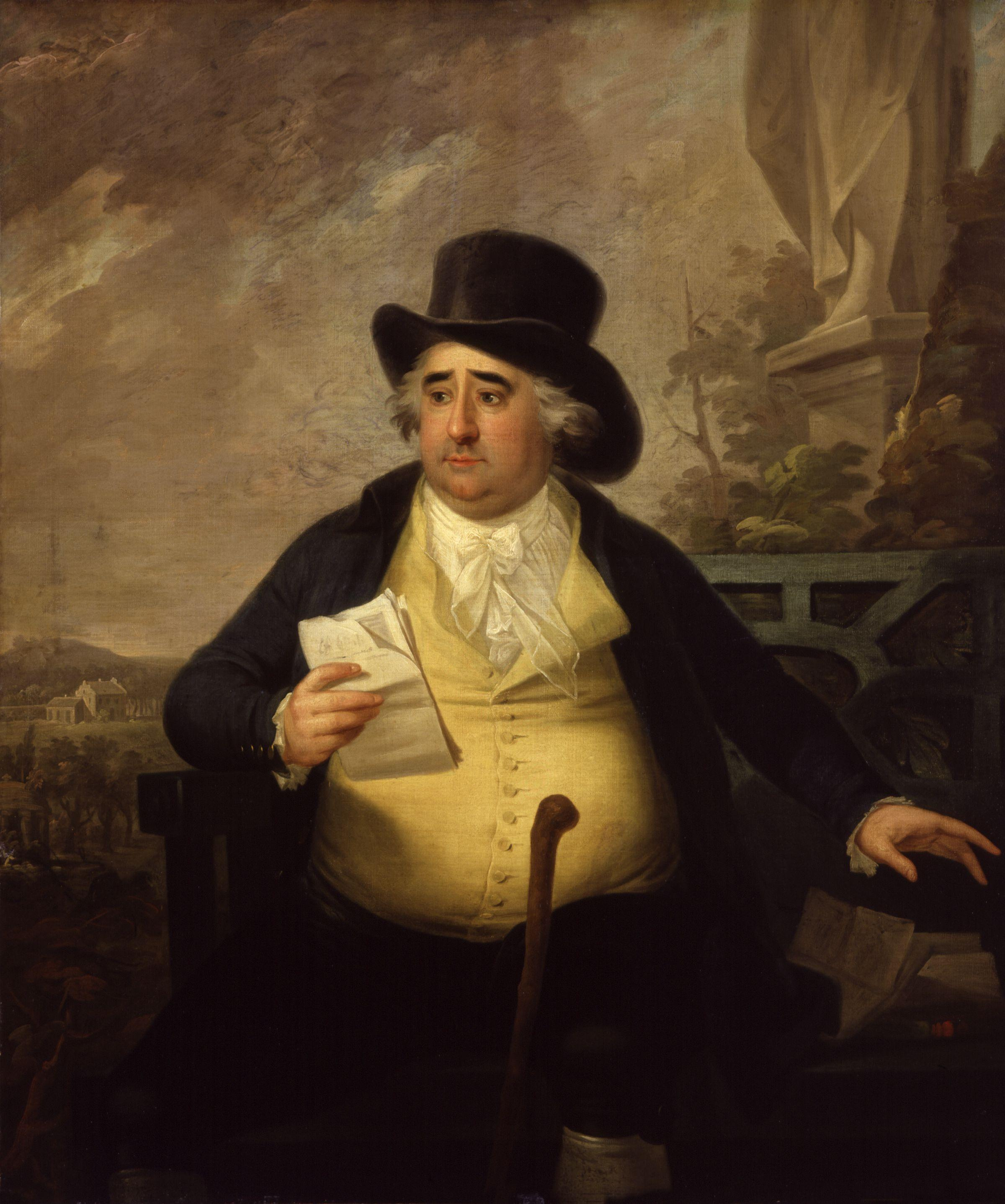
Portrait of Charles James Fox, 1794

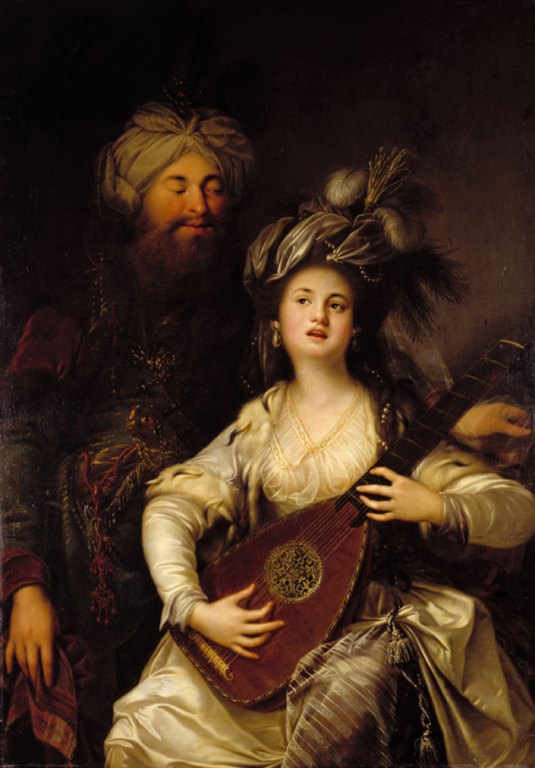
Roxelana and Suleiman the Magnificent

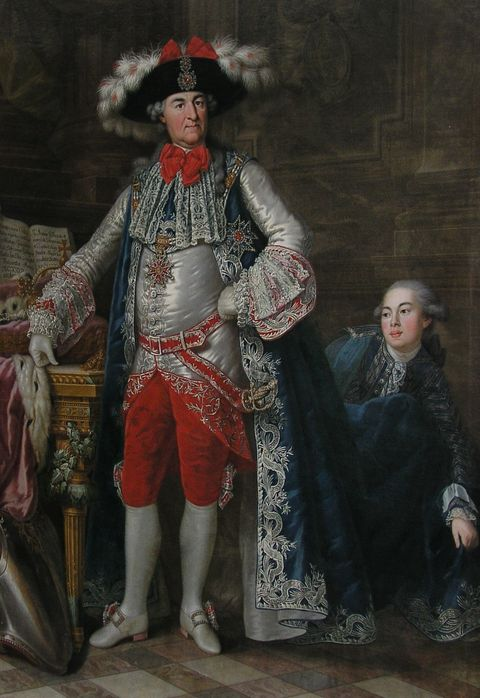
Charles Theodore, Elector of Bavaria

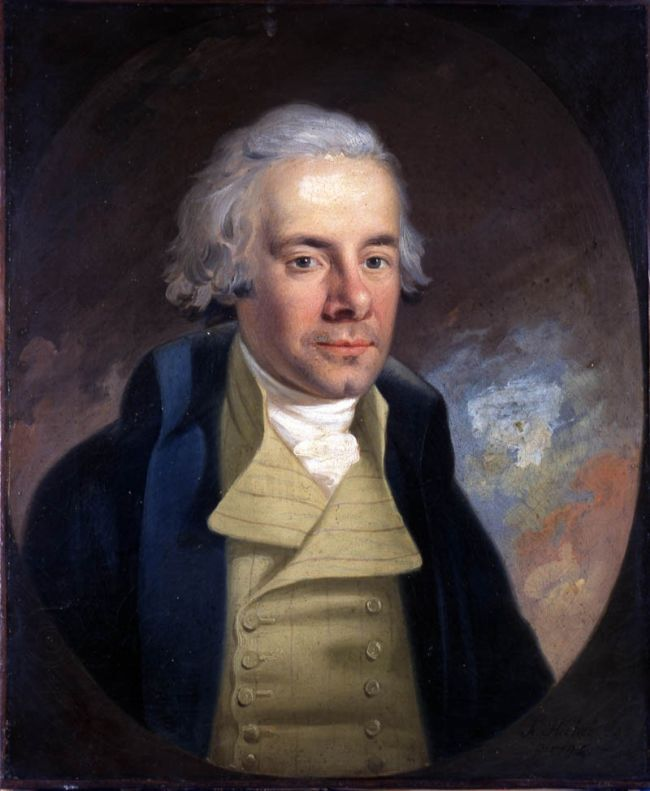
William Wilberforce

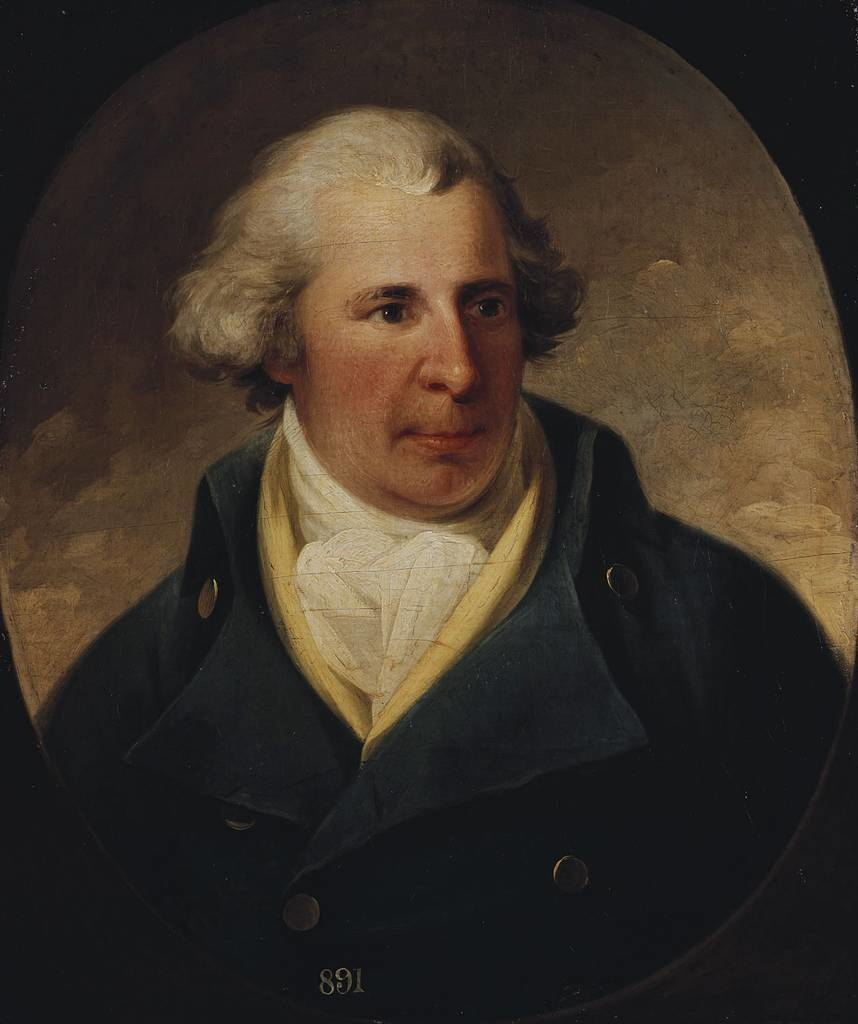
Richard Brinsley Sheridan

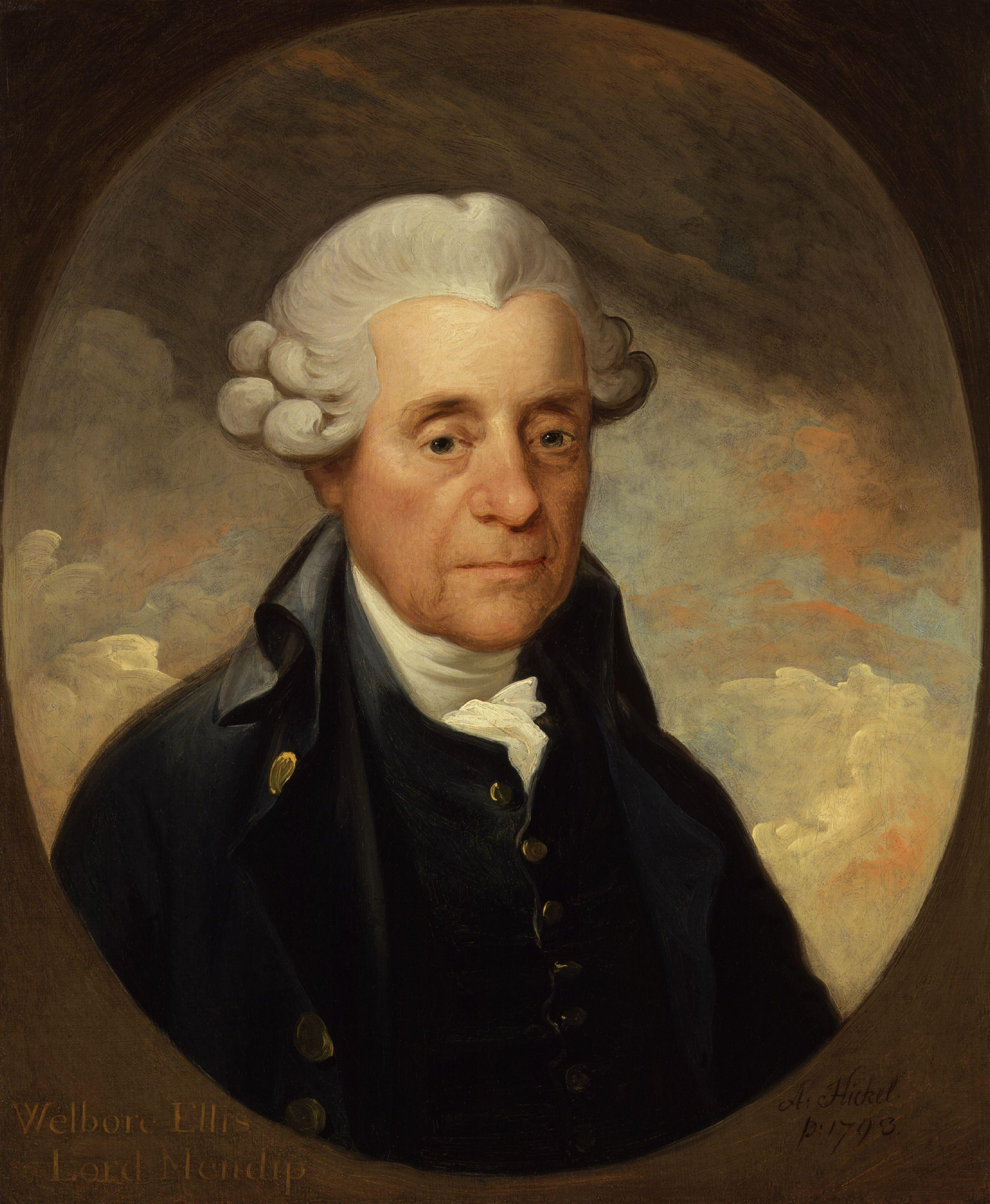
Welbore Ellis

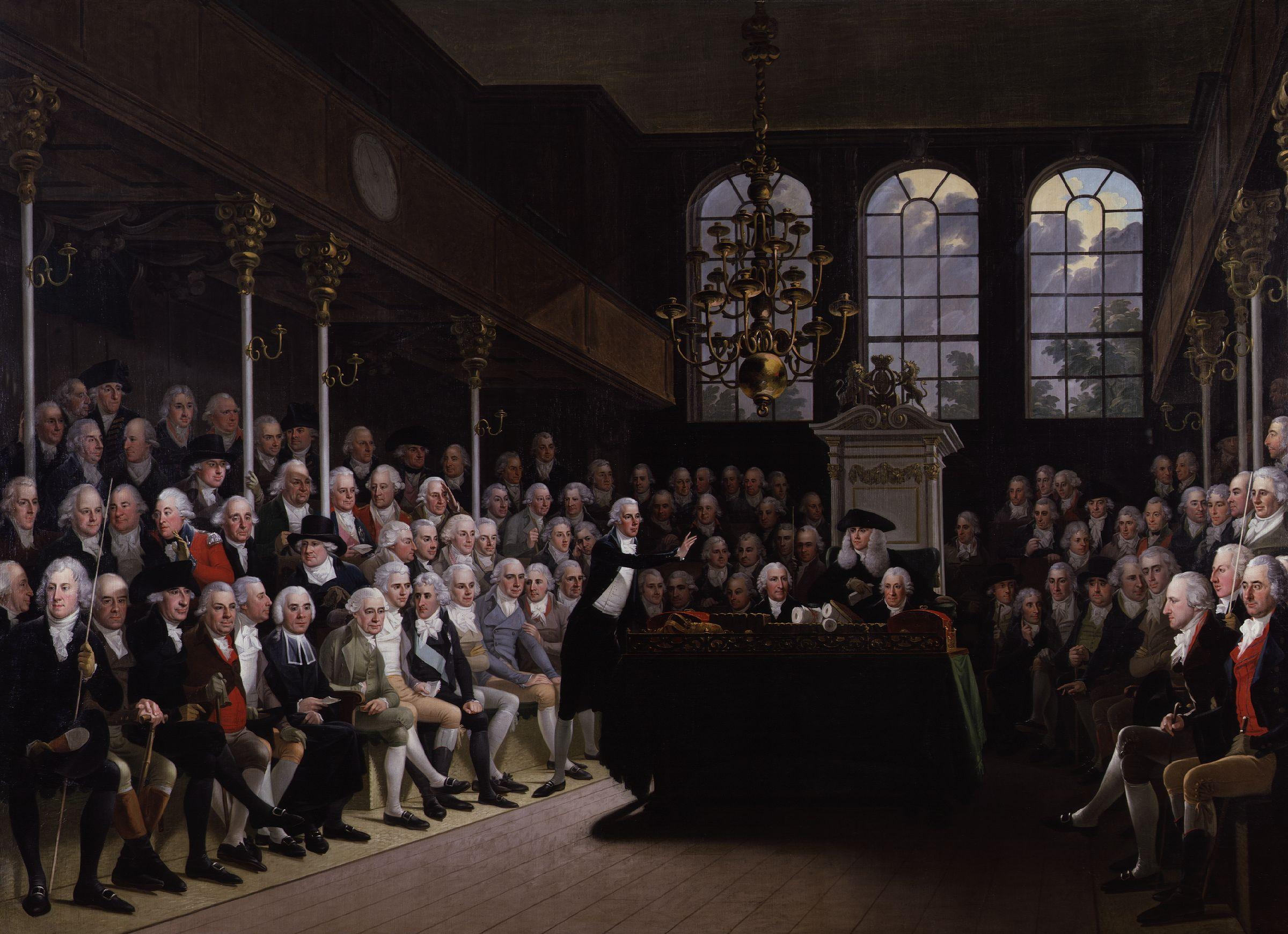
The House of Commons, 1793–94
