= Parliamentary representation from Cornwall =

The historic county of Cornwall in south-west England was represented in Parliament from the 13th century. This article provides a list of constituencies constituting the Parliamentary representation from Cornwall.

In 1889 an administrative county of Cornwall was created. Unlike many other counties there has been no major change between the historic and administrative county boundaries. The first part of this article covers the constituencies wholly or predominantly within the area of the historic county. The second part refers to constituencies mostly in another historic county, which included some territory from the historic county of Cornwall (if any). The summaries section only refers to the constituencies included in the first section of the constituency list.

== List of constituencies ==
The constituencies which existed in 1707 were those previously represented in the Parliament of England.

Key to abbreviations:-

- (Type) BC: Borough constituency, CC: County constituency.

=== Constituencies wholly or predominantly in the historic county ===
Constituency	Type	From	To	MPs	Notes
Bodmin	BC (1295–1885)	1295	1983	2 (1295–1868)	Unrepresented 1654–1659
Bodmin	CC (1885–1983)	1295	1983	1 (1868–1983)	Unrepresented 1654–1659
Bossiney	BC	1552	1832	2	Unrepresented 1654–1659
Callington	BC	1584	1832	2	Unrepresented 1654–1659
Camborne	CC	1885	1950	1	
Camborne and Redruth	CC	2010	*	1	
Camelford	BC	1547	1832	2	Unrepresented 1654–1659
Cornwall	CC	1290	1832	2 (1290–1654)	
Cornwall	CC	1290	1832	8 (1654–1659)	
Cornwall	CC	1290	1832	2 (1659–1832)	
East Cornwall	CC	1832	1885	2	
North Cornwall	CC	1918	*	1	
South East Cornwall	CC	1983	*	1	
West Cornwall	CC	1832	1885	2	
East Looe	BC	1571	1832	2	Unrepresented 1654–1659
East Looe and West Looe	BC	1654	1659	1	
Falmouth and Camborne	CC	1950	2010	1	
Fowey	BC	1571	1832	2	Unrepresented 1654–1659
Grampound	BC	1547	1821	2	Unrepresented 1654–1659
Helston	BC	1298	1885	2 (1298–1832)	Unrepresented 1654–1659
Helston	BC	1298	1885	1 (1832–1885)	Unrepresented 1654–1659
Launceston	BC (1295–1885)	1295	1918	2 (1295–1654)	Also called Dunheved
Launceston	BC (1295–1885)	1295	1918	1 (1654–1659)	Also called Dunheved
Launceston	BC (1295–1885)	1295	1918	2 (1659–1832)	Also called Dunheved
Launceston	BC (1295–1885)	1295	1918	1 (1832–1918)	Also called Dunheved
Launceston	CC (1885–1918)	1295	1918	1 (1832–1918)	Also called Dunheved
Liskeard	BC	1295	1885	2 (1295–1832)	Unrepresented 1654–1659
Liskeard	BC	1295	1885	1 (1832–1885)	Unrepresented 1654–1659
Lostwithiel	BC	1305	1832	2	Unrepresented 1654–1659
Mitchell	BC	1547	1832	2	Unrepresented 1654–1659. Also called St. Michael's.
Newport (Cornwall)	BC	1529	1832	2	Unrepresented 1654–1659. Also called Newport Iuxta Launceston.
Penryn	BC	1547	1832	2 (1547–1654)	
Penryn	BC	1547	1832	1 (1654–1659)	
Penryn	BC	1547	1832	2 (1659–1832)	
Penryn and Falmouth	BC (1832–1918)	1832	1950	2 (1832–1885)	
Penryn and Falmouth	CC (1918–1950)	1832	1950	1 (1885–1950)	
St Austell	CC	1885	1918	1	
St Austell and Newquay	CC	2010	*	1	
St Germans	BC	1563	1832	2	Unrepresented 1654–1659
St Ives	BC (1558–1885)	1558	*	2 (1558–1832)	Unrepresented 1654–1659
St Ives	CC (1885–*)	1558	*	1 (1832–*)	Unrepresented 1654–1659
St Mawes	BC	1563	1832	2	Unrepresented 1654–1659
Saltash	BC	1547	1832	2	Unrepresented 1654–1659
Tregony	BC	1295	1296	2	Unrepresented 1654–1659
Tregony	BC	1559	1832	2	Unrepresented 1654–1659
Truro	BC (1295–1885)	1295	1918	2 (1295–1654)	
Truro	BC (1295–1885)	1295	1918	1 (1654–1659)	
Truro	BC (1295–1885)	1295	1918	2 (1659–1885)	
Truro	CC (1885–1918)	1295	1918	1 (1885–1918)	
Truro	CC	1950	1997	1	
Truro and Falmouth	CC	2010	*	1	
Truro and St Austell	CC	1997	2010	1	
West Looe	BC	1553	1832	2	Unrepresented 1654–1659

=== Constituencies mostly in another historic county ===
Constituency	Type	From	To	MPs	Notes

=== Periods constituencies represented ===
	1290–1295	1295–1296	1296–1298	1298–1305	1305–1529	1529–1547	1547–1552	1552–1553	1553–1558	1558–1559
Bodmin		1295–1654								
Bossiney								1552–1654		
Camelford							1547–1654			
Cornwall	1290–1832									
Grampound							1547–1654			
Helston				1298–1654						
Launceston		1295–1918								
Liskeard		1295–1654								
Lostwithiel					1305–1654					
Mitchell							1547–1654			
Newport						1529–1654				
Penryn							1547–1654			
St Ives										1558–1654
Saltash							1547–1654			
Tregony		1295–1296								
Truro		1295–1918								
West Looe									1553–1654	

	1559–1563	1563–1571	1571–1584	1584–1654	1654–1659	1659–1821	1821–1832	1832–1885	1885–1918
Bodmin	1295–1654					1659–1983			
Bossiney	1552–1654					1659–1832			
Callington				1584–1654		1659–1832			
Camborne									1885–1950
Camelford	1547–1654					1659–1832			
Cornwall	1290–1832								
East Cornwall								1832–1885	
West Cornwall								1832–1885	
East Looe			1571–1654			1659–1832			
East Looe and West Looe					1654–1659				
Fowey			1571–1654			1659–1832			
Grampound	1547–1654					1659–1821			
Helston	1298–1654					1659–1885			
Launceston	1295–1918								
Liskeard	1295–1654					1659–1885			
Lostwithiel	1547–1654					1659–1832			
Mitchell	1547–1654					1659–1832			
Newport	1529–1654					1659–1832			
Penryn	1547–1654					1659–1832			
Penryn and Falmouth								1832–1950	
St Austell									1885–1918
St Germans		1563–1654				1659–1832			
St Ives	1558–1654					1659–*			
St Mawes		1563–1654				1659–1832			
Saltash	1547–1654					1659–1832			
Tregony	1559–1654					1659–1832			
Truro	1295–1918								
West Looe	1553–1654					1659–1832			

	1918–1950	1950–1983	1983–1997	1997–2010	2010–*
Bodmin	1659–1983				
Camborne	1885–1950				
Camborne and Redruth					2010–*
North Cornwall	1918–*				
South East Cornwall			1983–*		
Falmouth and Camborne		1950–2010			
Penryn and Falmouth	1832–1950				
St Austell and Newquay					2010–*
St Ives	1659–*				
Truro		1950–1997			
Truro and Falmouth					2010–*
Truro and St Austell				1997–2010	

== Summaries ==
=== Summary of constituencies by type and period ===
Note: Dates of representation prior to 1509 are provisional.

Type	1290	1295	1296	1298	1305	1529	1547	1552	1553	1558	1559	1563	1571	1584	1654	1659	1821	1832	1885	1918	2010
Borough	–	5	4	5	6	7	12	13	14	15	17	19	21	22	3	22	21	7	1	–	–
County	1	1	1	1	1	1	1	1	1	1	1	1	1	1	1	1	1	2	6	5	6
Total	1	6	5	6	7	8	13	14	15	16	18	20	22	23	4	23	22	9	7	5	6

=== Summary of members of parliament by type and period ===
Type	1290	1295	1296	1298	1305	1529	1547	1552	1553	1558	1559	1563	1571	1584	1654	1659	1821	1832	1868	1885	1918	2010
Borough	–	10	8	10	12	14	24	26	28	30	34	38	42	44	3	44	42	10	9	1	–	–
County	2	2	2	2	2	2	2	2	2	2	2	2	2	2	8	2	2	4	4	6	5	6
Total	2	12	10	12	14	16	26	28	30	32	36	40	44	46	11	46	44	14	13	7	5	6

== See also ==
- Members of Parliament for constituencies in Cornwall
- Wikipedia:Index of article on UK Parliament constituencies in England
- Wikipedia:Index of articles on UK Parliament constituencies in England N-Z
- Parliamentary representation by historic counties
- First Protectorate Parliament
- Unreformed House of Commons
- Politics of Cornwall
- Cornish rotten boroughs
- Mebyon Kernow
- Constitutional status of Cornwall
