= Parliamentary representation from Cambridgeshire =

The historic county of Cambridgeshire, located in the modern-day East of England region, has been represented in Parliament since the 13th century. This article provides the list of constituencies which have formed the parliamentary representation from Cambridgeshire.

In 1889 the historic county was divided between the administrative counties of Cambridgeshire and Isle of Ely. The two administrative counties merged in 1965 to form Cambridgeshire and Isle of Ely. In 1974 Cambridgeshire and Isle of Ely was merged with Huntingdon and Peterborough to form a new expanded non-metropolitan county of Cambridgeshire. Huntingdonshire was a historic and administrative county in its own right, whereas the Soke of Peterborough had been an administrative county which was part of the historic county of Northamptonshire.

This article covers only the constituencies wholly or predominantly within the area of the historic county of Cambridgeshire, both before and after the administrative changes of 1889, 1965 and 1974. Constituencies predominantly within the area of the historic county of Huntingdonshire are listed at Parliamentary representation from Huntingdonshire. For more information on the constituencies currently covering the modern-day ceremonial county of Cambridgeshire, see List of parliamentary constituencies in Cambridgeshire.

== List of constituencies ==
Key to abbreviations:

Type:

- BC: Borough constituency
- CC: County constituency
- UC: University constituency.

Notes:

- C1: historic county of Cambridgeshire (until 1889)
- C2: administrative county of Cambridgeshire (1889–1974)
- C3: non-metropolitan/ceremonial county of Cambridgeshire (from 1974)
- IE: administrative county of the Isle of Ely (1889–1974).

Note: Dates of representation prior to 1654 are provisional. The constituencies which existed in 1707 were previously represented in the Parliament of England.

North West Cambridgeshire does not include any part of the historic county of Cambridgeshire. It combines parts of the historic counties of Huntingdonshire and Northamptonshire.

=== Constituencies wholly or predominantly in the historic county ===
Constituency	Type	From	To	MPs	Notes
Cambridge	BC	1295	present	2 (1554 – 1654)	C1, C2, C3
Cambridge	BC	1295	present	1 (1654 – 1659)	C1, C2, C3
Cambridge	BC	1295	present	2 (1659 – 1885)	C1, C2, C3
Cambridge	BC	1295	present	1 (1885–present)	C1, C2, C3
Cambridgeshire	CC	1290	1885	2 (1290 - 1654)	C1, C2, C3
Cambridgeshire	CC	1290	1885	4 (1654 – 1659)	C1, C2, C3
Cambridgeshire	CC	1290	1885	2 (1659 – 1832)	C1, C2, C3
Cambridgeshire	CC	1290	1885	3 (1832 – 1885)	C1, C2, C3
Cambridgeshire	CC	1918	1983	1	C1, C2, C3
Cambridge University	UC	1603	1950	2 (1603 – 1654)	C1, C2
Cambridge University	UC	1603	1950	1 (1654 – 1659)	C1, C2
Cambridge University	UC	1603	1950	2 (1659 – 1950)	C1, C2
Chesterton	CC	1885	1918	1	C2
Ely	BC	1295	1296	2	C1
Isle of Ely	CC	1654	1659	2	C1, IE, C3
Isle of Ely	CC	1918	1983	1	C1, IE, C3
Newmarket	CC	1885	1918	1	C2
North East Cambridgeshire	CC	1983	present	1	C3, included a part of historic Northamptonshire prior to 2010.
South Cambridgeshire	CC	1997	present	1	C3
South East Cambridgeshire	CC	1983	present	1	C3
South West Cambridgeshire	CC	1983	1997	1	C3, included a part of historic Huntingdonshire
Wisbech	CC	1885	1918	1	C2

=== Periods constituencies represented ===
	1290 – 1295	1295 – 1296	1296 – 1603	1603 – 1654	1654 – 1659	1659 – 1885	1885 – 1918	1918 – 1950	1950 – 1983	1983 – 1997	1997 – present
Cambridge		1295 – present									
Cambridgeshire	1290 – 1885							1918 – 1983			
Cambridge University				1603 – 1950							
Chesterton							1885 – 1918				
Ely		1295 – 1296									
Isle of Ely					1654 – 1659			1918 – 1983			
Newmarket							1885 – 1918				
North East Cambridgeshire										1983 – present	
South Cambridgeshire											1997 – present
South East Cambridgeshire										1983 – present	
South West Cambridgeshire										1983 – 1997	
Wisbech							1885 – 1918				

== Summaries ==
=== Summary of constituencies by type and period ===
Type	1290	1295	1296	1603	1654	1659	1832	1885	1918	1950	1983	1997	next
Borough	-	2	1	1	1	1	1	1	1	1	1	1	1
County	1	1	1	1	2	1	1	3	2	2	3	3	3
University	-	-	-	1	1	1	1	1	1	-	-	-	-
Total	1	3	2	3	4	3	3	5	4	3	4	4	4

=== Summary of members of parliament by type and period ===
Type	1290	1295	1296	1603	1654	1659	1832	1885	1918	1950	1983	1997	next
Borough	-	4	2	2	1	2	2	1	1	1	1	1	1
County	2	2	2	2	6	2	3	3	2	2	3	3	3
University	-	-	-	2	1	2	2	2	2	-	-	-	-
Total	2	6	4	6	8	6	7	6	5	3	4	4	4

== See also ==
- Wikipedia:Index of article on UK Parliament constituencies in England
- Wikipedia:Index of articles on UK Parliament constituencies in England N-Z
- Parliamentary representation by historic counties
- First Protectorate Parliament
- Unreformed House of Commons
