= Parliamentary representation from Cumberland =

The historic county of Cumberland in north west England was represented in Parliament from the 13th century. This article provides a list of constituencies constituting the Parliamentary representation from Cumberland.

In 1889 Cumberland became an administrative county. In 1974 Cumberland was combined with Westmorland and northern Lancashire to form a new shire county of Cumbria.

The first part of this article covers the constituencies wholly or predominantly within the area of the historic county of Cumberland, both before and after the administrative changes of 1974. The second part refers to constituencies mostly in another historic county, which included some territory from the historic county of Cumberland. The summaries section only refers to the constituencies included in the first section of the constituency list.

== List of constituencies ==
Article names are followed by (UK Parliament constituency). The constituencies which existed in 1707 were those previously represented in the Parliament of England.

Key to abbreviations:-

- (Type) BC: Borough constituency, CC: County constituency.
- (Administrative County in Notes) C1 historic/administrative county of Cumberland (to 1974), C2 shire county of Cumbria (from 1974).

=== Constituencies wholly or predominantly in the historic county ===
Constituency	Type	From	To	MPs	Notes
Carlisle	BC	1295	*	2 (1295-1885)	C1, C2
Carlisle	BC	1295	*	1 (1654–1659)	C1, C2
Carlisle	BC	1295	*	2 (1659–1885)	C1, C2
Carlisle	BC	1295	*	1 (1885-*)	C1, C2
Cockermouth	BC (1295–96, 1640–1885)	1295	1296	2 (1295–96, 1640–1868)	C1: Unrepresented 1654-1659
Cockermouth	CC (1885–1918)	1640	1918	1 (1868–1918)	C1: Unrepresented 1654-1659
Copeland	CC	1983	*	1	C2
Cumberland	CC	1290	1832	2	C1
East Cumberland	CC	1832	1885	2	C1
North Cumberland	CC	1918	1950	1	C1
West Cumberland	CC	1832	1885	2	C1
Egremont	BC (1295–96)	1295	1296	2 (1295–96)	C1
Egremont	CC (1885–1918)	1885	1918	1 (1885–1918)	C1
Eskdale	CC	1885	1918	1	C1
Penrith	CC	1885	1918	1	C1
Penrith and Cockermouth	CC	1918	1950	1	C1
Penrith and The Border	CC	1950	*	1	C1, C2: From 1983 inc. part of Westmorland
Whitehaven	BC (1832–1918)	1832	1983	1	C1, C2
Whitehaven	CC (1918–1983)	1832	1983	1	C1, C2
Workington	CC	1918	*	1	C1, C2

=== Constituencies mostly in another historic county ===
Constituency	Type	From	To	MPs	Notes

=== Periods constituencies represented ===
	1290–1295	1295–1296	1296–1640	1640–1654	1654–1659	1659–1832	1832–1868	1868–1885	1885–1918
Carlisle		1295–*							
Cockermouth		1295–1296		1640–1654		1659–1918			
Cumberland	1290–1832								
East Cumberland							1832–1885		
West Cumberland							1832–1885		
Egremont		1295–1296							1885–1918
Eskdale									1885–1918
Penrith									1885–1918
Whitehaven							1832–1983		

	1918–1950	1950–1983	1983–*
Carlisle	1295–*		
Copeland			1983–*
North Cumberland	1918–1950		
Penrith and Cockermouth	1918–1950		
Penrith and The Border		1950–*	
Whitehaven	1832–1983		
Workington	1918–*		

== Summaries ==
Note: Dates for representation before 1509 are provisional.

=== Summary of constituencies by type and period ===
Type	1290	1295	1296	1640	1654	1659	1832	1868	1885	1918	1950
Borough	-	3	1	2	1	2	3	3	2	1	1
County	1	1	1	1	1	1	2	2	4	4	3
Total	1	4	2	3	2	3	5	5	6	5	4

=== Summary of members of parliament by type and period ===
Type	1290	1295	1296	1640	1654	1659	1832	1868	1885	1918	1950
Borough	-	6	2	4	1	4	5	4	2	1	1
County	2	2	2	2	2	2	4	4	4	4	3
Total	2	8	4	6	3	6	9	8	6	5	4

== See also ==
- Wikipedia:Index of article on UK Parliament constituencies in England
- Wikipedia:Index of articles on UK Parliament constituencies in England N-Z
- Parliamentary representation by historic counties
- First Protectorate Parliament
- Unreformed House of Commons
