= Parliamentary representation from the Isle of Wight =

The Isle of Wight, an island off the south coast of England, was part of the historic county of Hampshire (originally Southamptonshire), and was linked with it for parliamentary purposes until 1832, when it became a county constituency in its own right as it had also been during the Protectorate (1654–1659). Hampshire (including the Isle of Wight), located in the 21st century region of South East England, was represented in Parliament from the 13th century. This article provides a list of constituencies constituting the Parliamentary representation from Isle of Wight.

In 1890 the Isle of Wight became an administrative county. In 1974 it became a new non-metropolitan county and in 1995 a ceremonial county and unitary authority (with unchanged boundaries).

The first part of this article covers the constituencies wholly within the area of the Isle of Wight. The second part refers to the constituency of Hampshire, which included some territory from the Isle of Wight 1290–1654 and 1659–1832. The summaries section only refers to the constituencies included in the first section of the constituency list.

Following the 2023 Periodic Review of Westminster constituencies, the Isle of Wight constituency was abolished with the island being divided into Isle of Wight East and Isle of Wight West.

== Constituencies ==
Conservative † Labour ‡ Reform UK ¤

Constituency	Electorate	Majority	Member of Parliament	Nearest opposition	Map
Isle of Wight East	55,855	3,323	Joe Robertson †	Sarah Morris¤	
Isle of Wight West	55,406	3,177	Richard Quigley ‡	Bob Seely †	

== Former constituencies ==
Article names are followed by (UK Parliament constituency). The constituencies which existed in 1707 were those previously represented in the Parliament of England.

Key to abbreviations:-

- (Type) BC Borough constituency, CC County constituency.
- (County in Notes) H historic county of Hampshire (to 1832), IW1 parliamentary county of the Isle of Wight (1832–1890), IW2 administrative/non-metropolitan/ceremonial and unitary county of the Isle of Wight (from 1890).

=== Constituencies wholly in the Isle of Wight ===
Constituency	Type	From	To	MPs	Notes
Isle of Wight	CC	1654	1659	2	H, IW1, IW2
Isle of Wight	CC	1832	2024	1	H, IW1, IW2
Newport	BC	1295	1298	2	H, IW1: Unrepresented 1654–1659
Newport	BC	1584	1885	2 (1584–1868)	H, IW1: Unrepresented 1654–1659
Newport	BC	1584	1885	1 (1868–1885)	H, IW1: Unrepresented 1654–1659
Newtown	BC	1584	1832	2	H: Unrepresented 1654–1659
Yarmouth	BC	1584	1832	2	H: Unrepresented 1654–1659

=== Mostly mainland constituency including the Isle of Wight ===
Constituency	Type	From	To	MPs	Notes
Hampshire	CC	1290	1654	2	H: Did not include Isle of Wight 1654–1659.
Hampshire	CC	1659	1832	2	H: Did not include Isle of Wight 1654–1659.

=== Periods constituencies represented ===
	1290–1295	1295–1298	1298–1584	1584–1654	1654–1659	1659–1832	1832–1868	1868–1885	1885–2024	2024–*
Hampshire	1290–1654					1659–1832				
Isle of Wight East										2024–present
Isle of Wight West										2024–present
Isle of Wight					1654–1659		1832–2024			
Newport		1295–1298		1584–1654		1659–1885				
Newtown				1584–1654		1659–1832				
Yarmouth				1584–1654		1659–1832				

== Summaries ==
=== Summary of constituencies by type and period ===
Type	1290	1295	1298	1584	1654	1659	1832	1868	1885	2024
Borough	–	1	–	3	–	3	1	1	–	–
County	–	–	–	–	1	–	1	1	1	2
Total	–	1	–	3	1	3	2	2	1	2

=== Summary of members of parliament by type and period ===
Type	1290	1295	1298	1584	1654	1659	1832	1868	1885	2024
Borough	–	2	–	6	–	6	2	1	–	–
County	–	–	–	–	2	–	1	1	1	2
Total	–	2	–	6	2	6	3	2	1	2

== See also ==
- Wikipedia:Index of article on UK Parliament constituencies in England
- Wikipedia:Index of articles on UK Parliament constituencies in England N-Z
- Parliamentary representation by historic counties
- First Protectorate Parliament
- Unreformed House of Commons
- Politics of the Isle of Wight
