= Parliamentary representation from Devon =

The historic county of Devon in south west England was represented in Parliament from the 13th century. This article provides a list of constituencies constituting the Parliamentary representation from Devon.

In 1889 Devon became an administrative county. Unlike many other counties there has been no major change between the historic and administrative county boundaries. The first part of this article covers the constituencies wholly or predominantly within the area of the historic county. The second part refers to constituencies mostly in another historic county, which included some territory from the historic county of Devon (if any). The summaries section only refers to the constituencies included in the first section of the constituency list.

== List of constituencies ==
Article names are followed by (UK Parliament constituency). The constituencies which existed in 1707 were those previously represented in the Parliament of England.

Key to abbreviations:-

- (Type) BC: Borough constituency, CC: County constituency.

=== Constituencies wholly or predominantly in the historic county ===
Constituency	Type	From	To	MPs	Notes
Ashburton	BC	1298	1301	2	Unrepresented 1654-1659
Ashburton	BC	1640	1868	2 (1640–1832)	Unrepresented 1654-1659
Ashburton	BC	1640	1868	1 (1832–1868)	Unrepresented 1654-1659
Ashburton	CC	1885	1918	1	Unrepresented 1654-1659
Barnstaple	BC (1295-1885)	1295	1950	2 (1295-1654)	
Barnstaple	BC (1295-1885)	1295	1950	1 (1654–1659)	
Barnstaple	BC (1295-1885)	1295	1950	2 (1659–1885)	
Barnstaple	CC (1885–1950)	1295	1950	1 (1885–1950)	
Bere Alston	BC	1584	1832	2	Also spelt Beeralston. Unrepresented 1654-1659
Dartmouth	BC	1298	1301	2	Includes Clifton, Dartmouth, Hardness 1654-1659
Dartmouth	BC	1351	1868	2 (1351-1654)	Includes Clifton, Dartmouth, Hardness 1654-1659
Dartmouth	BC	1351	1868	1 (1654–1659)	Includes Clifton, Dartmouth, Hardness 1654-1659
Dartmouth	BC	1351	1868	2 (1659–1832)	Includes Clifton, Dartmouth, Hardness 1654-1659
Dartmouth	BC	1351	1868	1 (1832–1868)	Includes Clifton, Dartmouth, Hardness 1654-1659
Central Devon	CC	next	*	1	
Devon	CC	1290	1832	2 (1290-1654)	
Devon	CC	1290	1832	11 (1654–1659)	
Devon	CC	1290	1832	2 (1659–1832)	
East Devon	CC	1868	1885	2	
East Devon	CC	1997	*	1	
North Devon	CC	1832	1885	2	
North Devon	CC	1950	*	1	
South Devon	CC	1832	1885	2	
South West Devon	CC	1997	*	1	
West Devon	CC	1974	1983	1	
Devonport	BC	1832	1918	2	
Exeter	BC	1295	*	2 (1295-1885)	
Exeter	BC	1295	*	1 (1885-*)	
Honiton	BC	1301	1307	2	
Honiton	BC (1640–1885)	1640	1997	2 (1640–1654)	
Honiton	BC (1640–1885)	1640	1997	1 (1654–1659)	
Honiton	BC (1640–1885)	1640	1997	2 (1659–1885)	
Honiton	CC (1885–1997)	1640	1997	1 (1885–1997)	
Newton Abbot	CC	next	*	1	
Okehampton	BC	1301	1307	2	Unrepresented 1654-1659
Okehampton	BC	1640	1832	2	Unrepresented 1654-1659
Plymouth	BC	1298	1301	2	
Plymouth	BC	1442	1918	2	
Plymouth Devonport	BC	1918	next	1	
Plymouth Drake	BC	1918	1950	1	
Plymouth Drake	BC	1974	1997	1	
Plymouth Moor View	BC	next	*	1	
Plymouth Sutton	BC	1918	next	1	
Plymouth Sutton and Devonport	BC	next	*	1	
Plympton Erle	BC	1295	1832	2	Unrepresented 1654-1659
South Hams	CC	1983	1997	1	
South Molton	CC	1885	1950	1	
Tavistock	BC	1295	1296	2	Unrepresented 1654-1659
Tavistock	BC (1330-1885)	1330	1974	2 (1330-1868)	Unrepresented 1654-1659
Tavistock	CC (1885–1974)	1330	1974	1 (1868–1974)	Unrepresented 1654-1659
Teignbridge	CC	1983	next	1	
Tiverton	BC (1621–1885)	1621	1997	2 (1621–1654)	
Tiverton	BC (1621–1885)	1621	1997	1 (1654–1659)	
Tiverton	BC (1621–1885)	1621	1997	2 (1659–1885)	
Tiverton	CC (1885–1997)	1621	1997	1 (1885–1997)	
Tiverton and Honiton	CC	1997	*	1	
Torbay	BC	1974	*	1	
Torquay	CC (1885–1950)	1885	1974	1	
Torquay	BC (1950–1974)	1885	1974	1	
Torridge and West Devon	CC	1983	*	1	
Torrington	BC	1295	1307	2	
Torrington	CC	1950	1974	1	
Totnes	BC	1295	1868	2 (1295-1654)	
Totnes	BC	1295	1868	1 (1654–1659)	
Totnes	BC	1295	1868	2 (1659–1868)	
Totnes	CC	1885	1983	1	
Totnes	CC	1997	*	1	

=== Constituencies mostly in another historic county ===
Constituency	Type	From	To	MPs	Notes

=== Periods constituencies represented ===
	1290–1295	1295–1296	1296–1298	1298–1301	1301–1307	1307–1330	1330–1351	1351–1442	1442–1584	1584–1621
Ashburton				1298–1301						
Barnstaple		1295–1950								
Bere Alston										1584–1654
Dartmouth				1298–1301				1351–1868		
Devon	1290–1832									
Exeter		1295–*								
Honiton					1301–1307					
Okehampton					1301–1307					
Plymouth				1298–1301					1442–1918	
Plympton Erle		1295–1654								
Tavistock		1295–1296					1330–1654			
Torrington		1295–1307								
Totnes		1295–1868								

	1621–1640	1640–1654	1654–1659	1659–1832	1832–1868	1868–1885	1885–1918	1918–1950	1950–1974
Ashburton		1640–1654		1659–1868					
Barnstaple	1295–1950								
Bere Alston	1584–1654			1659–1832					
Dartmouth	1351–1868								
Devon	1290–1832								
East Devon						1868–1885			
North Devon					1832–1885				1950–*
South Devon					1832–1885				
Devonport					1832–1918				
Exeter	1295–*								
Honiton		1640–1997							
Okehampton		1640–1654		1659–1832					
Plymouth	1442–1918								
Plymouth Devonport								1918–next	
Plymouth Drake								1918–1950	
Plymouth Sutton								1918–next	
Plympton Erle	1295–1654			1659–1832					
South Molton							1885–1950		
Tavistock	1330–1654			1659–1974					
Tiverton	1621–1997								
Torquay							1885–1974		
Torrington									1950–1974
Totnes	1295–1868						1885–1983		

	1974–1983	1983–1997	1997–next	next–*
Central Devon				next–*
East Devon			1997–*	
North Devon	1950–*			
South West Devon			1997–*	
West Devon	1974–1983			
Exeter	1295–*			
Honiton	1640–1997			
Newton Abbot				next–*
Plymouth Devonport	1918–next			
Plymouth Drake	1974–1997			
Plymouth Moor View				next–*
Plymouth Sutton	1974–next			
Plymouth Sutton and Devonport				next–*
South Hams		1983–1997		
Teignbridge		1983–next		
Tiverton	1621–1997			
Tiverton and Honiton			1997–*	
Torbay	1974–*			
Torridge and West Devon		1983–*		
Totnes	1885–1983		1997–*	

== Summaries ==
=== Summary of constituencies by type and period ===
Note: Dates of representation prior to 1509 are provisional.

Type	1290	1295	1296	1298	1301	1307	1330	1351	1442	1584	1621	1640	1654	1659	1832	1868	1885	1918	1950	1974	1983
Borough	-	6	5	8	7	4	5	6	7	8	9	12	7	12	10	7	3	4	4	5	5
County	1	1	1	1	1	1	1	1	1	1	1	1	1	1	2	3	8	7	6	5	5
Total	1	7	6	9	8	5	6	7	8	9	10	13	8	13	12	10	11	11	10	10	10

Type	1997	next
Borough	4	4
County	7	8
Total	11	12

=== Summary of members of parliament by type and period ===
Type	1290	1295	1296	1298	1301	1307	1330	1351	1442	1584	1621	1640	1654	1659	1832	1868	1885	1918	1950	1974	1983
Borough	-	12	10	16	14	8	10	12	14	16	18	24	9	24	18	13	5	4	4	5	5
County	2	2	2	2	2	2	2	2	2	2	2	2	11	2	4	6	8	7	6	5	5
Total	2	14	12	18	16	10	12	14	16	18	20	26	20	26	22	19	13	11	10	10	10

Type	1997	next
Borough	4	4
County	7	8
Total	11	12

== See also ==
- Wikipedia:Index of article on UK Parliament constituencies in England
- Wikipedia:Index of articles on UK Parliament constituencies in England N-Z
- Parliamentary representation by historic counties
- First Protectorate Parliament
- Unreformed House of Commons
