= Parliamentary representation from Berkshire =

The historic county of Berkshire, in the 21st century region of South East England, was represented in Parliament from the 13th century. This article provides a list of constituencies constituting the Parliamentary representation from Berkshire.

In 1889 Berkshire became an administrative county. In 1974 a new shire county of Berkshire lost the Abingdon area to Oxfordshire, while the Slough district was transferred from Buckinghamshire. In 1997 the ceremonial county of Berkshire was divided between several unitary authorities.

The first part of this article covers the constituencies wholly or predominantly within the area of the historic county of Berkshire, both before and after the administrative changes of 1889, 1974 and 1997. The second part refers to constituencies mostly in another historic county, which included some territory from the historic county of Berkshire. The summaries section only refers to the constituencies included in the first section of the constituency list.

== List of constituencies ==
Article names are followed by (UK Parliament constituency). The constituencies which existed in 1707 were those previously represented in the Parliament of England.

Key to abbreviations:-

- (Type) BC: Borough constituency, CC: County constituency.
- (County in Notes) B1 historic county of Berkshire (to 1889), B2 administrative county of Berkshire (1889–1974), B3 shire/ceremonial county of Berkshire (from 1974), O shire county of Oxfordshire.

=== Constituencies wholly or predominantly in the historic county ===
Constituency	Type	From	To	MPs	Notes
Abingdon	BC (1558–1885)	1558	1983	1	B1, B2, O
Abingdon	CC (1885–1983)	1558	1983	1	B1, B2, O
Berkshire	CC	1290	1885	2 (1290–1654)	B1
Berkshire	CC	1290	1885	5 (1654–1659)	B1
Berkshire	CC	1290	1885	2 (1659–1832)	B1
Berkshire	CC	1290	1885	3 (1832–1885)	B1
East Berkshire	CC	1983	1997	1	B3
Bracknell	CC	1997	*	1	B3
Maidenhead	CC	1997	*	1	B
Newbury	CC	1885	*	1	B1, B2, B3
Reading	BC	1295	1950	2 (1295–1654)	B1, B2: Includes Parliamentary Borough of Reading article for pre-1885.
Reading	BC	1295	1950	1 (1654–1659)	B1, B2: Includes Parliamentary Borough of Reading article for pre-1885.
Reading	BC	1295	1950	2 (1659–1885)	B1, B2: Includes Parliamentary Borough of Reading article for pre-1885.
Reading	BC	1295	1950	1 (1885–1950)	B1, B2: Includes Parliamentary Borough of Reading article for pre-1885.
Reading	BC	1955	1974	1	B1, B2: Includes Parliamentary Borough of Reading article for pre-1885.
Reading East	CC (1983–1997)	1983	*	1	B3
Reading East	BC (1997–*)	1983	*	1	B3
Reading North	BC	1950	1955	1	B2, B3
Reading North	BC	1974	1983	1	B2, B3
Reading South	BC	1950	1955	1	B2, B3
Reading South	CC	1974	1983	1	B2, B3
Reading West	CC	1983	*	1	B3
Wallingford	BC	1295	1885	2 (1295–1832)	B1: Unrepresented 1654–1659
Wallingford	BC	1295	1885	1 (1832–1885)	B1: Unrepresented 1654–1659
Windsor	BC	1302	By 1377	2	B1, B2, B3: Including New Windsor. Unrepresented; 1654–1659. Includes part of the historic counties of Buckinghamshire and Middlesex from 1997.
Windsor	BC (1424–1918)	1424	1974	2 (1424–1868)	B1, B2, B3: Including New Windsor. Unrepresented; 1654–1659. Includes part of the historic counties of Buckinghamshire and Middlesex from 1997.
Windsor	CC (1918–1974)	1424	1974	1 (1868–1974)	B1, B2, B3: Including New Windsor. Unrepresented; 1654–1659. Includes part of the historic counties of Buckinghamshire and Middlesex from 1997.
Windsor	CC	1997	*	1	B1, B2, B3: Including New Windsor. Unrepresented; 1654–1659. Includes part of the historic counties of Buckinghamshire and Middlesex from 1997.
Windsor and Maidenhead	CC	1974	1997	1	B3: Includes part of historic county of Buckinghamshire from 1983.
Wokingham	CC	1885	1918	1	B1, B2, B3
Wokingham	CC	1950	*	1	B1, B2, B3

=== Constituencies mostly in another historic county ===
Constituency	Type	From	To	MPs	Notes
Oxford West and Abingdon	CC	1983	*	1	O: Includes the Abingdon area.
Wantage	CC	1983	*	1	O: Includes the Wallingford area.

=== Periods constituencies represented ===
	1290–1295	1295–1302	1302–<1377	<1377–1424	1424–1558	1558–1654	1654–1659	1659–1832
Abingdon						1558–1983		
Berkshire	1290–1885							
Reading		1295–1950						
Wallingford		1295–1654						1659–1885
Windsor			1302–<1377		1424–1654			1659–1974

	1832–1885	1885–1918	1918–1950	1950–1955	1955–1974	1974–1983	1983–1997	1997–*
Abingdon	1558–1983							
Berkshire	1290–1885							
East Berkshire							1983–1997	
Bracknell								1997–*
Maidenhead								1997–*
Newbury		1885–*						
Oxford West and Abingdon							1983–*	
Reading	1295–1950				1955–1974			
Reading East							1983–*	
Reading North				1950–1955		1974–1983		
Reading South				1950–1955		1974–1983		
Reading West							1983–*	
Wallingford	1659–1885							
Wantage							1983–*	
Windsor	1659–1974							1997–*
Windsor and Maidenhead						1974–1997		
Wokingham		1885–1918		1950–*				

== Summaries ==
=== Summary of constituencies by type and period ===
Type	1290	1295	1302	<1377	1424	1558	1654	1659	1832	1868	1885	1918	1950	1955	1974	1983	1997
Borough	–	2	3	2	3	4	2	4	4	4	2	1	2	1	1	–	1
County	1	1	1	1	1	1	1	1	1	1	3	3	4	4	5	6	6
Total	1	3	4	3	4	5	3	5	5	5	5	4	6	5	6	6	7

=== Summary of members of parliament by type and period ===
Type	1290	1295	1302	<1377	1424	1558	1654	1659	1832	1868	1885	1918	1950	1955	1974	1983	1997
Borough	–	4	6	4	6	7	2	7	6	5	2	1	2	1	1	–	1
County	2	2	2	2	2	2	5	2	3	3	3	3	4	4	5	6	6
Total	2	6	8	6	8	9	7	9	9	8	5	4	6	5	6	6	7

== See also ==
- Wikipedia:Index of article on UK Parliament constituencies in England
- Wikipedia:Index of articles on UK Parliament constituencies in England N-Z
- Parliamentary representation by historic counties
- First Protectorate Parliament
- Unreformed House of Commons
