= Parliamentary representation from Bedfordshire =

The historic county of Bedfordshire, located in the twenty-first century region of East of England, was represented in Parliament from the thirteenth century. This article provides a list of constituencies constituting the Parliamentary representation from Bedfordshire.

In 1889 Bedfordshire became an administrative county and in 1974 much the same area became a shire county. Luton became a unitary authority in 1997, but it remains part of the ceremonial county of Bedfordshire.

The first part of this article covers the constituencies wholly or predominantly within the area of the historic county of Bedfordshire, both before and after the administrative changes of 1889 and 1974. The second part refers to constituencies mostly in another historic county, which included some territory from the historic county of Bedfordshire (if any). The summaries section only refers to the constituencies included in the first section of the constituency list.

== List of constituencies ==
Article names are followed by (UK Parliament constituency). The constituencies which existed in 1707 were those previously represented in the Parliament of England.

Key to abbreviations:

- (Type) BC: Borough constituency, CC: County constituency.
- (Administrative County in Notes) B historic/administrative/shire/ceremonial county of Bedfordshire.

=== Constituencies wholly or predominantly in the historic county ===
Constituency	Type	From	To	MPs	Notes
Bedford	BC (1295-1918)	1295	1983	2 (1295-1654)	B
Bedford	BC (1295-1918)	1295	1983	1 (1654–1659)	B
Bedford	BC (1295-1918)	1295	1983	2 (1659–1885)	B
Bedford	BC (1295-1918)	1295	1983	1 (1885–1983)	B
Bedford	CC (1918–1983)	1295	1983	1 (1885–1983)	B
Bedford	BC (1997-*)	1997	*	1 (1997-*)	B
Bedfordshire	CC	1290	1885	2 (1290-1654)	B
Bedfordshire	CC	1290	1885	5 (1654–1659)	B
Bedfordshire	CC	1290	1885	2 (1659–1885)	B
Mid Bedfordshire	CC	1918	*	1	B
North Bedfordshire	CC	1983	1997	1	B
North East Bedfordshire	CC	1997	*	1	B
South Bedfordshire	CC	1950	1983	1	B
South West Bedfordshire	CC	1983	*	1	B
Biggleswade	CC	1885	1918	1	B
Luton	CC (1885–1950)	1885	1974	1	B
Luton	BC (1950–1974)	1885	1974	1	B
Luton East	BC	1974	1983	1	B
Luton North	CC (1983–1997)	1983	*	1	B: Including North Luton 1983-1997
Luton North	BC (1997-*)	1983	*	1	B: Including North Luton 1983-1997
Luton South	BC	1983	*	1	B
Luton West	BC	1974	1983	1	B

=== Constituencies mostly in another historic county ===
Constituency	Type	From	To	MPs	Notes

=== Periods constituencies represented ===
	1290–1295	1295–1885	1885–1918	1918–1950	1950–1974	1974–1983	1983–1997	1997–*
Bedford		1295–1983						1997–*
Bedfordshire	1290–1885							
Mid Bedfordshire				1918–*				
North Bedfordshire							1983–1997	
North East Bedfordshire								1997–*
South Bedfordshire					1950–1983			
South West Bedfordshire							1983–*	
Biggleswade			1885–1918					
Luton			1885–1974					
Luton East						1974–1983		
Luton North							1983–*	
Luton South							1983–*	
Luton West						1974–1983		

== Summaries ==
=== Summary of constituencies by type and period ===
Type	1290	1295	1654	1659	1885	1918	1950	1974	1983	1997
Borough	-	1	1	1	1	-	1	2	1	3
County	1	1	1	1	2	3	3	3	4	3
Total	1	2	2	2	3	3	4	5	5	6

=== Summary of members of parliament by type and period ===
Type	1290	1295	1654	1659	1885	1918	1950	1974	1983	1997
Borough	-	2	1	2	1	-	1	2	1	3
County	2	2	5	2	2	3	3	3	4	3
Total	2	4	6	4	3	3	4	5	5	6

== See also ==
- Wikipedia:Index of article on UK Parliament constituencies in England
- Wikipedia:Index of articles on UK Parliament constituencies in England N-Z
- Parliamentary representation by historic counties
- First Protectorate Parliament
- Unreformed House of Commons
