= Parliamentary representation from Westmorland =

The historic county of Westmorland in north west England was represented in Parliament from the 13th century. This article provides a list of constituencies constituting the Parliamentary representation from Westmorland.

In 1889 an administrative county of Westmorland was created. In 1974 Westmorland was combined with Cumberland and northern Lancashire to form a new non-metropolitan county of Cumbria.

The first part of this article covers the constituencies wholly or predominantly within the area of the historic county of Westmorland, both before and after the administrative changes of 1974. The second part refers to constituencies mostly in another historic county, which included some territory from the historic county of Westmorland. The summaries section only refers to the constituencies included in the first section of the constituency list.

== List of constituencies ==
Article names are followed by (UK Parliament constituency). The constituencies which existed in 1707 were those previously represented in the Parliament of England.

Key to abbreviations:-

- (Type) BC Borough constituency, CC County constituency.
- (Administrative County in Notes) C shire county of Cumbria (from 1974); W historic/administrative county of Westmorland (to 1974), C2 shire county of Cumbria (from 1974).

=== Constituencies wholly or predominantly in the historic county ===
Constituency	Type	From	To	MPs	Notes
Appleby	BC	1295	1832	2	W: Unrepresented 1654–1659; also called Westmorland North 1885–1918
Appleby	CC	1885	1918	1	W: Unrepresented 1654–1659; also called Westmorland North 1885–1918
Kendal	BC	1832	1885	1	W: also called Westmorland South 1885–1918
Kendal	CC	1885	1918	1	W: also called Westmorland South 1885–1918
Westmorland	CC	1290	1885	2	W, C
Westmorland	CC	1918	1983	1	W, C
Westmorland and Lonsdale	CC	1983	*	1	C: Partly in the historic county of Lancashire

=== Constituencies mostly in another historic county ===
Constituency	Type	From	To	MPs	Notes
Penrith and The Border	CC	1950	*	1	C: From 1983 mostly in Cumberland but partly in Westmorland

=== Periods constituencies represented ===
	1290–1295	1295–1654	1654–1659	1659–1832	1832–1885	1885–1918	1918–1983	1983–*
Appleby		1295–1654		1659–1832		1885–1918		
Kendal					1832–1885	1885–1918		
Penrith and The Border								1983–*
Westmorland	1290–1885						1918–1983	
Westmorland and Lonsdale								1983–*

== Summaries ==
=== Summary of constituencies by type and period ===
Type	1290	1295	1654	1658	1832	1885	1918
Borough	-	1	-	1	1	-	-
County	1	1	1	1	1	2	1
Total	1	2	1	2	2	2	1

=== Summary of members of parliament by type and period ===
Type	1290	1295	1654	1658	1832	1885	1918
Borough	-	2	-	2	1	-	-
County	2	2	2	2	2	2	1
Total	2	4	2	4	3	2	1

== See also ==
- Wikipedia:Index of article on UK Parliament constituencies in England
- Wikipedia:Index of articles on UK Parliament constituencies in England N-Z
- Parliamentary representation by historic counties
- First Protectorate Parliament
- Unreformed House of Commons
