= Parliamentary representation from Derbyshire =

The historic county of Derbyshire, located in the 21st century region of East Midlands, was represented in Parliament from the 13th century. This article provides a list of constituencies constituting the Parliamentary representation from Derbyshire.

In 1889 Derbyshire became an administrative county and in 1974 much the same area became a shire county. Derby became a unitary authority in 1997, but it remains part of the ceremonial county of Derbyshire.

The first part of this article covers the constituencies wholly or predominantly within the area of the historic county of Derbyshire, both before and after the administrative changes of 1889 and 1974. The second part refers to constituencies mostly in another historic county, which included some territory from the historic county of Derbyshire (if any). The summaries section only refers to the constituencies included in the first section of the constituency list.

== List of constituencies ==
Article names are followed by (UK Parliament constituency). The constituencies which existed in 1707 were those previously represented in the Parliament of England.

Key to abbreviations:

- (Type) BC: Borough constituency, CC: County constituency.
- (Administrative County in Notes) D: historic/administrative/shire/ceremonial county of Derbyshire.

=== Constituencies wholly or predominantly in the historic county ===
Constituency	Type	From	To	MPs	Notes
Amber Valley	CC	1983	*	1	D
Belper	CC	1918	1983	1	D
Bolsover	CC	1950	*	1	D
Chesterfield	BC	1885	*	1	D
Clay Cross	CC	1918	1950	1	D
Derby	BC	1295	1950	2 (1295-1654)	D
Derby	BC	1295	1950	1 (1654–1659)	D
Derby	BC	1295	1950	2 (1659–1950)	D
Derby North	BC	1950	*	1	D
Derby South	BC	1950	*	1	D
Derbyshire	CC	1290	1832	2 (1290-1654)	D
Derbyshire	CC	1290	1832	4 (1654–1659)	D
Derbyshire	CC	1290	1832	2 (1659–1832)	D
Derbyshire Dales	CC	2010	*	1	D
East Derbyshire	CC	1868	1885	2	D
Erewash	CC	1983	*	1	D
High Peak	CC	1885	*	1	D (including Crowden, Tintwistle and Woodhead from Cheshire after 1983)
Ilkeston	CC	1885	1983	1	D
Mid Derbyshire	CC	1885	1918	2 (1885-1918)	D
Mid Derbyshire	CC	2010	*	1 (2010-*)	D
North Derbyshire	CC	1832	1885	2	D
North East Derbyshire	CC	1885	*	1	D
South Derbyshire	CC	1832	1950	2 (1832-1885)	D
South Derbyshire	CC	1832	1950	1 (1885-1950)	D
South Derbyshire	CC	1983	*	1 (1983-*)	D
South East Derbyshire	CC	1950	1983	1	D
West Derbyshire	CC	1885	2010	1	D

=== Periods constituencies represented ===
	1290–1295	1295–1654	1854–1659	1659–1832	1832–1868	1868–1885	1885–1918	1918–1950	1950–1983	1983–2010	2010–*
Amber Valley										1983–*	
Belper								1918–1983			
Bolsover									1950–*		
Chesterfield							1885–*				
Clay Cross								1918–1950			
Derby		1295–1654		1659–1950							
Derby North									1950–*		
Derby South									1950–*		
Derbyshire	1920–1832										
Derbyshire Dales											2010–*
East Derbyshire						1868–1885					
Erewash										1983–*	
High Peak							1885–*				
Ilkeston							1885–1983				
Mid Derbyshire							1885–1918				2010–*
North Derbyshire					1832–1885						
North East Derbyshire							1885–*				
South Derbyshire					1832–1950					1983–*	
South East Derbyshire									1950–1983		
West Derbyshire							1885–2010				

== Summaries ==
=== Summary of constituencies by type and period ===
Type	1290	1295	1654	1659	1832	1868	1885	1918	1950	1983	2010
Borough	-	1	-	1	1	1	2	2	3	3	3
County	1	1	1	1	2	3	7	7	7	7	8
Total	1	2	1	2	3	4	9	9	10	10	11

=== Summary of members of parliament by type and period ===
Type	1290	1295	1654	1659	1832	1868	1885	1918	1950	1983	2010
Borough	-	2	-	2	2	2	3	3	3	3	3
County	2	2	4	2	4	6	7	7	7	7	8
Total	2	4	4	4	6	8	9	9	10	10	11

== See also ==
- Wikipedia:Index of article on UK Parliament constituencies in England
- Wikipedia:Index of articles on UK Parliament constituencies in England N-Z
- Parliamentary representation by historic counties
- First Protectorate Parliament
- Unreformed House of Commons
