= Parliamentary representation from Rutland =

The historic county of Rutland in the east midlands of England was represented in Parliament from the 13th century. This article provides a list of constituencies constituting the Parliamentary representation from Rutland.

The historic county was a single constituency, for parliamentary purposes, until 1918. From that year the county was linked with a part of a neighbouring historic county, first Lincolnshire and then Leicestershire.

The first part of this article covers the constituency wholly within the area of the historic county of Rutland, before 1918. The second part refers to constituencies mostly in another historic county, which included the historic county of Rutland. The summaries section only refers to the constituencies included in the first section of the constituency list.

== List of constituencies ==
Article names are followed by (UK Parliament constituency). The constituency which existed in 1707 were those previously represented in the Parliament of England.

Key to abbreviations:-

- (Type) BC Borough constituency, CC County constituency.
- (Administrative County in Notes) Le administrative/shire county of Leicestershire, Li administrative/shire county of Lincolnshire, R historic county of Rutland.

=== Constituency in the historic county ===
Constituency	Type	From	To	MPs	Notes
Rutland	CC	1290	1918	2 (1290-1885)	R
Rutland	CC	1290	1918	1 (1885–1918)	R

=== Constituencies mostly in another historic county ===
Constituency	Type	From	To	MPs	Notes
Rutland and Melton	CC	1983	*	1	R/Le
Rutland and Stamford	CC	1918	1983	1	R/Li

=== Periods constituencies represented ===
	1290–1918	1918–1983	1983–*
Rutland	1290–1918		
Rutland and Melton			1983–*
Rutland and Stamford		1918–1983	

== Summaries ==
=== Summary of constituencies by type and period ===
Type	1290-1918
County	1
Total	1

=== Summary of members of parliament by type and period ===
Type	1290-1885	1885-1918
County	2	1
Total	2	1

== See also ==
- Wikipedia:Index of article on UK Parliament constituencies in England
- Wikipedia:Index of articles on UK Parliament constituencies in England N-Z
- Parliamentary representation by historic counties
- First Protectorate Parliament
- Unreformed House of Commons
