= Parliamentary representation from Buckinghamshire =

The historic county of Buckinghamshire, in the 21st century region of South East England, was represented in Parliament from the 13th century. This article provides a list of constituencies constituting the Parliamentary representation from Buckinghamshire.

In 1889 Buckinghamshire became an administrative county. In 1974 a new non-metropolitan county of Buckinghamshire lost the Eton and Slough areas to Berkshire, while the part of Colnbrook formerly included in the county also became part of Berkshire in 1995.

The first part of this article covers the constituencies wholly or predominantly within the area of the historic county of Buckinghamshire, both before and after the administrative changes of 1889, 1974 and 1995. The second part refers to constituencies mostly in another historic county, which included some territory from the historic county of Buckinghamshire. The summaries section only refers to the constituencies included in the first section of the constituency list.

Note: Dates of representation before 1510 are provisional.

== List of constituencies ==
Article names are followed by (UK Parliament constituency). The constituencies which existed in 1707 were those previously represented in the Parliament of England.

Key to abbreviations:

- (Type) BC: Borough constituency, CC: County constituency.
- (County in Notes) Be: non-metropolitan/ceremonial county of Berkshire (from 1974), Bu1: historic county of Buckinghamshire (to 1889), Bu2: administrative county of Buckinghamshire (1889–1974), Bu3: non-metropolitan/ceremonial county of Buckinghamshire (from 1974).

=== Constituencies wholly or predominantly in the historic county ===
Constituency	Type	From	To	MPs	Notes
Amersham	BC	1300	<1307	2	Bu1: Unrepresented 1654–1659
Amersham	BC	1625	1832	2	Bu1: Unrepresented 1654–1659
Aylesbury	BC (1554–1885)	1554	*	2 (1554–1654)	Bu1, Bu2, Bu3
Aylesbury	BC (1554–1885)	1554	*	1 (1654–1659)	Bu1, Bu2, Bu3
Aylesbury	BC (1554–1885)	1554	*	2 (1659–1885)	Bu1, Bu2, Bu3
Aylesbury	CC (1885–*)	1554	*	1 (1885–*)	Bu1, Bu2, Bu3
Beaconsfield	CC	1974	*	1	Bu3
Buckingham	BC (1542–1885)	1542	*	2 (1542–1654)	Bu1, Bu2, Bu3
Buckingham	BC (1542–1885)	1542	*	1 (1654–1659)	Bu1, Bu2, Bu3
Buckingham	BC (1542–1885)	1542	*	2 (1659–1868)	Bu1, Bu2, Bu3
Buckingham	CC (1885–*)	1542	*	1 (1868–*)	Bu1, Bu2, Bu3
Buckinghamshire	CC	1290	1885	2 (1290–1654)	Bu1
Buckinghamshire	CC	1290	1885	5 (1654–1659)	Bu1
Buckinghamshire	CC	1290	1885	2 (1659–1832)	Bu1
Buckinghamshire	CC	1290	1885	3 (1832–1885)	Bu1
South Buckinghamshire	CC	1950	1974	1	Bu2
Chesham and Amersham	CC	1974	*	1	Bu3
Eton and Slough	CC (1945–1950)	1945	1983	1	Bu2, Be
Eton and Slough	BC (1950–1983)	1945	1983	1	Bu2, Be
Great Marlow	BC	1300	<1307	2	Bu1: Unrepresented 1654–1659
Great Marlow	BC	1625	1885	2 (1625–1868)	Bu1: Unrepresented 1654–1659
Great Marlow	BC	1625	1885	1 (1868–1885)	Bu1: Unrepresented 1654–1659
Milton Keynes	CC	1983	1992	1	Bu3
Milton Keynes North	CC	2010	*	1	Bu3
Milton Keynes South	BC	2010	*	1	Bu3
Milton Keynes South West	BC	1992	2010	1	Bu3
North East Milton Keynes	CC	1992	2010	1	Bu3
Slough	BC	1983	*	1	Be
Wendover	BC	1300	<1307	2	Bu1: Unrepresented 1654–1659
Wendover	BC	1625	1832	2	Bu1: Unrepresented 1654–1659
Wycombe	BC (1295–1885)	1295	*	2 (1295–1654)	Bu1, Bu2, Bu3: Includes Chipping Wycombe.
Wycombe	BC (1295–1885)	1295	*	1 (1654–1659)	Bu1, Bu2, Bu3: Includes Chipping Wycombe.
Wycombe	BC (1295–1885)	1295	*	2 (1659–1868)	Bu1, Bu2, Bu3: Includes Chipping Wycombe.
Wycombe	CC (1885–*)	1295	*	1 (1868–*)	Bu1, Bu2, Bu3: Includes Chipping Wycombe.

=== Constituencies mostly in another historic county ===
Constituency	Type	From	To	MPs	Notes
Windsor	CC	1997	*	1	Be: Includes the Eton and Colnbrook areas.
Windsor and Maidenhead	CC	1983	1997	1	Be: Includes the Eton area.

=== Periods constituencies represented ===
	1290–1295	1295–1300	1300–<1307	<1307–1542	1542–1554	1554–1625	1625–1654	1654–1659	1659–1832
Amersham			1300–<1307				1625–1654		1659–1832
Aylesbury						1554–*			
Buckingham					1542–*				
Buckinghamshire	1290–1885								
Great Marlow			1300–<1307				1625–1654		1659–1885
Wendover			1300–<1307				1625–1654		1659–1832
Wycombe		1295–*							

	1832–1868	1868–1885	1885–1918	1918–1945	1945–1950	1950–1974	1974–1983	1983–1992	1992–1997
Aylesbury	1554–*								
Beaconsfield							1974–*		
Buckingham	1542–*								
Buckinghamshire	1290–1885								
South Buckinghamshire						1950–1974			
Chesham and Amersham							1974–*		
Eton and Slough					1945–1983				
Great Marlow	1659–1885								
Milton Keynes								1983–1992	
Milton Keynes South West									1992–next
North East Milton Keynes									1992–next
Slough								1983–*	
Windsor and Maidenhead								1983–1997	
Wycombe	1295–*								

	1997–next	next–*
Aylesbury	1554–*	
Beaconsfield	1974–*	
Buckingham	1542–*	
Chesham and Amersham	1974–*	
Milton Keynes North		next–*
Milton Keynes South		next–*
Milton Keynes South West	1992–next	
North East Milton Keynes	1992–next	
Slough	1983–*	
Windsor	1997–*	
Wycombe	1295–*	

== Summaries ==
=== Summary of constituencies by type and period ===
Type	1290	1295	1300	<1307	1542	1554	1625	1654	1659	1832	1868	1885	1918	1945	1950	1974	1983	1992	1997	next
Borough	–	1	4	1	2	3	6	3	6	4	4	–	–	–	1	1	1	2	2	2
County	1	1	1	1	1	1	1	1	1	1	1	3	3	4	4	5	6	6	6	6
Total	1	2	5	2	3	4	7	4	7	5	5	3	3	4	5	6	7	8	8	8

=== Summary of members of parliament by type and period ===
Type	1290	1295	1300	<1307	1542	1554	1625	1654	1659	1832	1868	1885	1918	1945	1950	1974	1983	1992	1997	next
Borough	–	2	8	2	4	6	12	3	12	8	5	–	–	–	1	1	1	2	2	2
County	2	2	2	2	2	2	2	5	2	3	3	3	3	4	4	5	6	6	6	6
Total	2	4	10	4	6	8	14	8	14	11	8	3	3	4	5	6	7	8	8	8

== See also ==
- Wikipedia:Index of article on UK Parliament constituencies in England
- Wikipedia:Index of articles on UK Parliament constituencies in England N-Z
- Parliamentary representation by historic counties
- First Protectorate Parliament
- Unreformed House of Commons
