= Parliamentary representation from Huntingdonshire =

The historic county of Huntingdonshire, located in the modern-day East of England region, has been represented in the Parliament of the United Kingdom since the 13th century. This article provides the list of constituencies which have formed the parliamentary representation from Huntingdonshire.

In 1889 the area of the historic county formed the administrative county of Huntingdonshire. In 1965 the administrative county was merged with the Soke of Peterborough. Peterborough had been an administrative county which was part of the historic county of Northamptonshire. In 1974 Huntingdon and Peterborough was combined with the administrative county of Cambridgeshire and Isle of Ely, to form a new expanded non-metropolitan county of Cambridgeshire.

The first part of this article covers the constituencies wholly or predominantly within the area of the historic county of Huntingdonshire, both before and after the administrative changes of 1889, 1965 and 1974. The second part refers to constituencies mostly in another historic county, which included some territory from the historic county of Huntingdonshire. The summaries section only refers to the constituencies included in the first section of the constituency list. For more information on the constituencies currently covering the modern-day ceremonial county of Cambridgeshire, see List of parliamentary constituencies in Cambridgeshire.

== List of constituencies ==
Key to abbreviations:

Type:

- BC: Borough constituency
- CC: County constituency

Notes:

- C: non-metropolitan/ceremonial county of Cambridgeshire (from 1974)
- H1: historic county of Huntingdonshire (until 1889)
- H2: administrative county of Huntingdonshire (1889-1965)
- HP: administrative county of Huntingdon and Peterborough (1965-1974).

Note: Dates of representation prior to 1654 are provisional. The constituencies which existed in 1707 were previously represented in the Parliament of England.

=== Constituencies wholly or predominantly in the historic county ===
| Constituency | Type | From | To | MPs | Notes |
|---|---|---|---|---|---|
| North West Cambridgeshire | CC | 1997 | present | 1 | C, includes a part of the historic county of Northamptonshire |
| Huntingdon | BC (1295 - 1885) | 1295 | 1918 | 2 (1295 - 1654) | H1, H2, C, included a part of the historic county of Northamptonshire from 1983 - 1997 |
| Huntingdon | BC (1295 - 1885) | 1295 | 1918 | 1 (1654 - 1659) | H1, H2, C, included a part of the historic county of Northamptonshire from 1983 - 1997 |
| Huntingdon | BC (1295 - 1885) | 1295 | 1918 | 2 (1659 - 1868) | H1, H2, C, included a part of the historic county of Northamptonshire from 1983 - 1997 |
| Huntingdon | CC (1885 - 1918) | 1295 | 1918 | 1 (1868 - 1918) | H1, H2, C, included a part of the historic county of Northamptonshire from 1983 - 1997 |
| Huntingdon | CC | 1983 | present | 1 | H1, H2, C, included a part of the historic county of Northamptonshire from 1983 - 1997 |
| Huntingdonshire | CC | 1290 | 1885 | 2 (1290 - 1654) | H1, H2, HP, C |
| Huntingdonshire | CC | 1290 | 1885 | 3 (1654 - 1659) | H1, H2, HP, C |
| Huntingdonshire | CC | 1290 | 1885 | 2 (1659 - 1885) | H1, H2, HP, C |
| Huntingdonshire | CC | 1918 | 1983 | 1 | H1, H2, HP, C |
| Ramsey | CC | 1885 | 1918 | 1 | H1, H2 |

Note: North West Cambridgeshire does not include any part of the historic county of Cambridgeshire. It combines ten wards of the District of Huntingdonshire (part of the historic county of Huntingdonshire) and a smaller number of wards from the City of Peterborough (part of the historic county of Northamptonshire).

=== Constituencies mostly in another historic county ===
| Constituency | Type | From | To | MPs | Notes |
|---|---|---|---|---|---|
| South West Cambridgeshire | CC | 1983 | 1997 | 1 | C: Mostly in the historic county of Cambridgeshire |

=== Periods constituencies represented ===
| | 1290 – 1295 | 1295 – 1885 | 1885 – 1918 | 1918 – 1983 | 1983 – 1997 | 1997 – present |
|---|---|---|---|---|---|---|
| North West Cambridgeshire | | | | | | 1997 – present |
| South West Cambridgeshire | | | | | 1983 – 1997 | |
| Huntingdon | | 1295 – 1918 | | | 1983 – present | |
| Huntingdonshire | 1290 – 1885 | | | 1918 – 1983 | | |
| Ramsey | | | 1885 – 1918 | | | |

== Summaries ==
=== Summary of constituencies by type and period ===
| Type | 1290 | 1295 | 1868 | 1885 | 1918 | 1983 | 1997 |
|---|---|---|---|---|---|---|---|
| Borough | - | 1 | 1 | - | - | - | - |
| County | 1 | 1 | 1 | 2 | 1 | 1 | 2 |
| Total | 1 | 2 | 2 | 2 | 1 | 1 | 2 |

=== Summary of members of parliament by type and period ===
| Type | 1290 | 1295 | 1868 | 1885 | 1918 | 1983 | 1997 |
|---|---|---|---|---|---|---|---|
| Borough | - | 2 | 1 | - | - | - | - |
| County | 2 | 2 | 2 | 2 | 1 | 1 | 2 |
| Total | 2 | 4 | 3 | 2 | 1 | 1 | 2 |

== See also ==
- Wikipedia:Index of article on UK Parliament constituencies in England
- Wikipedia:Index of articles on UK Parliament constituencies in England N-Z
- Parliamentary representation by historic counties
- First Protectorate Parliament
- Unreformed House of Commons
