= Parliamentary representation by historic counties =

The Parliamentary representation by historic counties is summarised in this article, with links to the articles about the representation of each of the historic counties in the House of Commons of the Parliaments of England (to 1707), Great Britain (1707-1800) and the United Kingdom (from 1801).

== History of the historic counties and parliament ==
England was divided into shires during the Anglo-Saxon period, before the Norman conquest in 1066. After the conquest these sub-divisions of the country became known as counties. There were some changes in the number and boundaries of the counties in the 11th to 13th centuries, but by the time the representatives from them (known as Knights of the Shire) were summoned to attend Parliaments from the 13th century, the list of the historic counties was fixed. The two Palatine counties of Cheshire and Durham were not represented until the sixteenth and seventeenth centuries respectively, but the other historic counties each returned two county members.

In addition places (which in theory were urban areas) were created as parliamentary boroughs, from time to time starting in the thirteenth century. A place once enfranchised tended to continue to be required to send members to Parliament (known as burgesses or citizens for cities and barons for the Cinque Ports), even if it always had an insignificant population or decayed over the centuries. Although some boroughs included parts of more than one county it was customary to regard them as being associated with one county for the purpose of parliamentary representation.

The historic counties and the parliamentary boroughs within them (apart from a few boroughs straddling county boundaries which were conventionally associated with one of the historic counties) were considered as distinct communities before 1918. English counties were first divided for parliamentary purposes under the Reform Act 1832, when larger counties were divided into two divisions. However, none of the county divisions crossed the historic county boundaries (except that under the Parliamentary Boundaries Act 1832 detached parts were allocated for parliamentary purposes to the counties in which they were geographically located).

Boundary reviews were considered county by county unless, in the interests of producing more equal constituencies, two or more review areas (administrative counties and county boroughs between the redistributions of 1918 and 1974) were combined for a particular redistribution.

In 1918 Rutland, the smallest of the historic counties was joined with part of another county, but it was rare for an English constituency to cross county or county borough boundaries before the redistribution of 1983, which was based on the altered local government arrangements introduced in 1974. Since then the Boundary Commission for England has more often combined review areas to create cross border constituencies.

Although the historic counties were replaced, for most official purposes, by administrative counties in 1889; these were mostly the historic counties (with some rationalisation of borders) or well established sub-divisions of them. It was not until the local government reforms, in 1965 in the London area and 1974 elsewhere in England, that many administrative boundaries diverged in a major way from those of the historic counties. However, as the historic counties remain the focus of local patriotism it is worth continuing the lists until the present day.

== Tables ==
- (Type of constituency) BC Borough constituency, CC County constituency, UC University constituency.

The historic county of Hampshire (formerly Southamptonshire) is divided between its mainland and Isle of Wight parts. The only overlap is for the two member county constituency before 1832, which is included in the mainland entry. Otherwise the article allocates all constituencies to the historic county they are wholly or predominantly located in. Borough constituencies which were located in counties of themselves, county boroughs or unitary authorities have been allocated to the geographic historic county they were associated with even if they had had no administrative connection for centuries (the City of London and Middlesex for example).

Rutland has not provided the predominant part of any constituency since 1918, but all other historic counties have contained at least one seat until the present.

=== Table 1: List of historic counties and when they were represented ===
Note: Dates of representation prior to 1510 are provisional.

Historic county	From	Until	Twenty-first century regions
Bedfordshire	1290	to date	East of England
Berkshire	1290	to date	South East England
Buckinghamshire	1290	to date	South East England
Cambridgeshire	1290	to date	East of England
Cheshire	1545	to date	North West England
Cornwall	1290	to date	South West England
Cumberland	1290	to date	North West England
Derbyshire	1290	to date	East Midlands
Devon	1290	to date	South West England
Dorset	1290	to date	South West England
Durham	1675	to date	North East England
Essex	1290	to date	East of England, London
Gloucestershire	1290	to date	South West England
Hampshire	1290	to date	South East England
Herefordshire	1290	to date	West Midlands
Hertfordshire	1290	to date	East of England, London
Huntingdonshire	1290	to date	East of England
Isle of Wight	1295	to date	South East England
Kent	1290	to date	London, South East England
Lancashire	1290	to date	North West England
Leicestershire	1290	to date	East Midlands
Lincolnshire	1290	to date	East Midlands, Yorkshire and the Humber
Middlesex	1290	to date	East of England, London, South East England
Norfolk	1290	to date	East of England
Northamptonshire	1290	to date	East Midlands
Northumberland	1290	to date	North East England
Nottinghamshire	1290	to date	East Midlands
Oxfordshire	1290	to date	South East England
Rutland	1290	1918	East Midlands
Shropshire	1290	to date	West Midlands
Somerset	1290	to date	South West England
Staffordshire	1290	to date	West Midlands
Suffolk	1290	to date	East of England
Surrey	1290	to date	London, South East England
Sussex	1290	to date	South East England
Warwickshire	1290	to date	West Midlands
Westmorland	1290	to date	North West England
Wiltshire	1290	to date	South West England
Worcestershire	1290	to date	West Midlands
Yorkshire	1290	to date	Yorkshire and the Humber

=== Table 2: List of historic counties representation, by constituencies and period ===
Historic county	1290	1295	1298	1603	1654	1659	1683	1832	1868	1885	1918	1945	1950	1955	1974	1983	1997	next
Bedfordshire	1	2	2	2	2	2	2	2	2	3	3	3	4	4	5	4	6	6
Berkshire	1	3	3	5	3	5	5	5	5	5	4	4	6	5	6	6	7	7
Buckinghamshire	1	2	2	4	4	7	7	5	5	3	3	4	5	5	6	7	8	8
Cambridgeshire	1	3	2	3	4	3	3	3	3	5	4	4	3	3	3	4	4	4
Cheshire	0																	
Cornwall	1	6	6	23	4	23	23	9	9	7	5	5	5	5	5	5	5	6
Cumberland	1	4	2	2	2	3	3	5	5	6	5	5	4	4	4	4	4	4
Derbyshire	1																	
Devon	1	7	9	9	8	13	13	12	10	11	11	11	10	10	10	10	11	12
Dorset	1																	
Durham	0																	
Essex	1																	
Gloucestershire	1																	
Hampshire	1																	
Herefordshire	1																	
Hertfordshire	1																	
Huntingdonshire	1	2	2	2	2	2	2	2	2	2	1	1	1	1	1	1	1	2
Isle of Wight	0	1	0	3	1	3	3	2	2	1	1	1	1	1	1	1	1	1
Kent	1																	
Lancashire	1																	
Leicestershire	1																	
Lincolnshire	1																	
Middlesex	1	1	2	3	3	3	3	6	9	48	53	60	51	51	43	37	34	32
Norfolk	1																	
Northamptonshire	1																	
Northumberland	1																	
Nottinghamshire	1																	
Oxfordshire	1																	
Rutland	1	1	1	1	1	1	1	1	1	1	0	0	0	0	0	0	0	0
Shropshire	1																	
Somerset	1																	
Staffordshire	1																	
Suffolk	1																	
Surrey	1																	
Sussex	1																	
Warwickshire	1																	
Westmorland	1	2	2	2	1	2	2	2	2	2	1	1	1	1	1	1	1	1
Wiltshire	1																	
Worcestershire	1																	
Yorkshire	1																	
Historic County	1290	1295	1298	1603	1654	1659	1683	1832	1868	1885	1918	1945	1950	1955	1974	1983	1997	next

=== Table 3: List of historic counties representation, by members and period ===
Historic County	1290	1295	1298	1603	1654	1659	1683	1832	1868	1885	1918	1945	1950	1955	1974	1983	1997	next
Bedfordshire	2	4	4	4	6	4	4	4	4	3	3	3	4	4	5	4	6	6
Berkshire	2	6	6	9	7	9	9	9	8	5	4	4	6	5	6	6	7	7
Buckinghamshire	2	4	4	8	8	14	14	11	8	3	3	4	5	5	6	7	8	8
Cambridgeshire	2	6	4	6	8	6	6	7	7	6	5	5	3	3	3	4	4	4
Cheshire	0																	
Cornwall	2	12	12	46	11	46	46	14	13	7	5	5	5	5	5	5	5	6
Cumberland	2	8	4	4	3	6	6	9	8	6	5	5	4	4	4	4	4	4
Derbyshire	2																	
Devon	2	14	18	18	20	26	26	22	19	13	11	11	10	10	10	10	11	12
Dorset	2																	
Durham	0																	
Essex	2																	
Gloucestershire	2																	
Hampshire	2																	
Herefordshire	2																	
Hertfordshire	2																	
Huntingdonshire	2	4	4	4	4	4	4	4	3	2	1	1	1	1	1	1	1	2
Isle of Wight	0	2	0	6	2	6	6	3	2	1	1	1	1	1	1	1	1	1
Kent	2																	
Lancashire	2																	
Leicestershire	2																	
Lincolnshire	2																	
Middlesex	2	2	6	8	12	8	8	14	19	49	54	61	51	51	43	37	34	32
Norfolk	2																	
Northamptonshire	2																	
Northumberland	2																	
Nottinghamshire	2																	
Oxfordshire	2																	
Rutland	2	2	2	2	2	2	2	2	2	1	0	0	0	0	0	0	0	0
Shropshire	2																	
Somerset	2																	
Staffordshire	2																	
Suffolk	2																	
Surrey	2																	
Sussex	2																	
Warwickshire	2																	
Westmorland	2	4	4	4	2	4	4	3	3	2	1	1	1	1	1	1	1	1
Wiltshire	2																	
Worcestershire	2																	
Yorkshire	2																	
Historic County	1290	1295	1298	1603	1654	1659	1683	1832	1868	1885	1918	1945	1950	1955	1974	1983	1997	next

== See also ==
- Wikipedia:Index of article on UK Parliament constituencies in England
- Wikipedia:Index of articles on UK Parliament constituencies in England N-Z
