= Cornish rotten and pocket boroughs =

Boroughs in the unreformed House of Commons (pre-1832)

The Cornish rotten and pocket boroughs were one of the most striking anomalies of the Unreformed House of Commons in the Parliament of the United Kingdom before the Reform Act 1832. Immediately before the Act, Cornwall had twenty boroughs, each electing two members of parliament, as well as its two knights of the shire, a total of 42 members, far in excess of the number to which its wealth, population or other importance would seem to entitle it. Until 1821, there was yet another borough which sent two men to parliament, giving Cornwall only one fewer member in the House of Commons than the whole of Scotland.

Most of these were rotten boroughs, a term meaning communities which had decreased in size and importance since the Middle Ages and were too small to justify separate representation. The rest were pocket boroughs, in which a "patron" owned enough of the tenements which carried a vote that he was able to choose both members. The patron's nominees were usually returned unopposed, as anyone standing against them was sure to lose.

== History ==
=== Genesis of the boroughs ===
Cornwall's representation was nothing out of the ordinary before the Tudor period. Of the six boroughs continuously represented in the House of Commons of England since medieval times, five (Bodmin, Helston, Launceston, Liskeard and Truro) could be considered the county's chief towns and survived the Reform Act, while the sixth (Lostwithiel) was probably once substantial enough even though it had dwindled by 1832. But the 15 boroughs added between 1553 and 1584 were almost all insubstantial places from the start, hand-made rotten boroughs.

It is clear that the extent of Royal influence in Cornwall (particularly through the Duchy) was a factor in the creation of so many new boroughs here in the Tudor period, and it is often assumed that the purpose was simply to allow the Commons to be packed with Royal or at least court nominees. If so, the policy was a failure. As Sir John Neale pointed out, far from the new boroughs consistently returning government supporters they frequently returned quite the opposite. The explanation can probably be found in the way that most new boroughs arose at this period, as a result of a petition from the town in question receiving support from some figure with sufficient influence at court to secure its acceptance. No doubt many of these petitions were initiated by the patrons themselves, in full (and justified) expectation of being able to sway the elections should the borough be enfranchised. The extent of Royal influence in Cornwall may therefore only have been a factor in the sense that it explains why it was the natural place for a disproportionate number of influential courtiers to set up proprietary boroughs.

Nevertheless, it is certainly true that in later years the Cornish rotten boroughs provided a reliable source of safe seats for the Duchy to such an extent that they were affectionately known as the 'Prince's Party' - although in the 18th century, when the Prince of Wales was sometimes at odds with the administration, this did not always translate into safe government seats. Parallels have been drawn with the medieval Cornish Stannary Parliament, which was the Cornish parliament of 'tinners at large'. With the advent of the Duchy of Cornwall in 1337, the tinners at large were ousted in favour of Duchy 'yes' men with the result that the Government of Cornwall controlled the Cornish Parliament.

=== The Cornish boroughs in the century before Reform ===
By the 18th century, few if any of the Cornish boroughs had competitive political elections in modern sense: competition, where it occurred at all, was on the basis of personal influence or pecuniary advantage promised and delivered. Sir Lewis Namier, who in his classic analysis of the structure of British politics in 1760 took the Cornish boroughs as one of his case studies, called it "an elaborate and quaint machinery for making members of parliament, in which irrelevancy reached its acme... there was no humbug about the way in which Cornish boroughs chose their representatives.". This he expounded by quoting Thomas Pitt, writing in 1740, who considered that "...there are few [Cornish] boroughs where the common sort of people do not think they have as much right to sell themselves and their votes, as they have to sell their corn and their cattle." Party competition in the modern sense was entirely absent: in fact there seems to have been a tacit agreement that the Tories should be left undisturbed in the two county seats while making no attempt to interfere in the Whig boroughs, except for the few wholly owned by Tory patrons.

The Cornish boroughs consisted in two distinct types. In some, all or most of the (male) householders could vote, the electorates in some cases being as high as a few hundred: in these, control might depend on appealing to the voters' venial interests, usually through bribery (open or otherwise) but also through the potential for coercion; where a poor voter was aware how his landlord wanted him to vote, it is unrealistic to attempt to distinguish between the two, and properties were of course frequently bought and sold purely for their electoral value. These boroughs where a relatively high proportion of the inhabitants could vote were somewhat more common in Cornwall than elsewhere in the country. But Cornwall also contained boroughs where the right to vote was much more restricted, as at Truro for example, where only the two dozen members of the corporation could vote in a town of several thousand inhabitants. Here control depended simply on political manipulation of the corporation's composition.

By the early 19th century, Cornwall was providing many of the most egregious examples of corruption that were sustaining the campaign for Parliamentary reform. Grampound had already become a by-word for corruption, with its voters boasting of receiving 300 guineas a man for their votes, before widespread bribery was proved at the 1818 election; this led to a special Act of Parliament, passed in 1821, which disfranchised Grampound completely and transferred its seats to Yorkshire. Penryn was found guilty of similar misbehaviour in 1828, and a bill was put forward to take away its seats in the same way, although it was never passed and soon was superseded by the more general Reform Bill. At Camelford, two successive elections in 1819 were declared void and the borough's representation temporarily suspended, though it was restored with the summoning of a new Parliament. But the majority of the Cornish boroughs by this period were entirely "closed", under the complete control of one or more private patrons, bribery as such being absent because entirely unnecessary.

=== Abolition ===
The Reform Act 1832 disenfranchised all but seven of the Cornish boroughs, and one of those (Penryn) while technically surviving had been entirely swamped by the addition of a larger neighbouring town. Truro had also been trebled in size, Launceston doubled, and Bodmin and St Ives increased by more than half, even before allowing for the reform of the franchise. Since the vote had been confined to the freemen at Helston and to the corporation and freemen at Liskeard, it would therefore be fair to say that none of the Cornish boroughs survived recognisably, although some of their names remained attached to more representative constituencies.

== List of the Cornish boroughs ==
Cornish rotten and pocket boroughs (Cornwall)

=== Cornish borough abolished in 1821 ===
- Grampound

=== Cornish boroughs abolished in 1832 ===
The following 13 boroughs were abolished by the Parliamentary Boundaries Act 1832:

Boroughs with statistics for 1831
Borough	Houses	Voters
Bossiney	67	25
Callington (but only 42 voters in 1816)	225	225
Camelford	110	31
East Looe	167	38
Fowey	340	331
Lostwithiel	303	24
Mitchell	23	7
Newport	106	Around 12
Saltash	245	154
St Germans	99	7
St Mawes	95	87
Tregony	234	260–300
West Looe	126	19

=== Cornish boroughs that retained the right to send members to parliament after 1832 ===
- Bodmin
- Helston
- Launceston
- Liskeard
- Penryn - extended and renamed as Penryn and Falmouth
- St Ives
- Truro

== See also ==
- Constituencies abolished by the 1832 Reform Act
- Cornwall (UK Parliament constituency)
- Cornwall (territorial duchy)
- Stannary law
- Stannary
- Hundreds of Cornwall
