= Unreformed House of Commons =

British legislature pre-1832

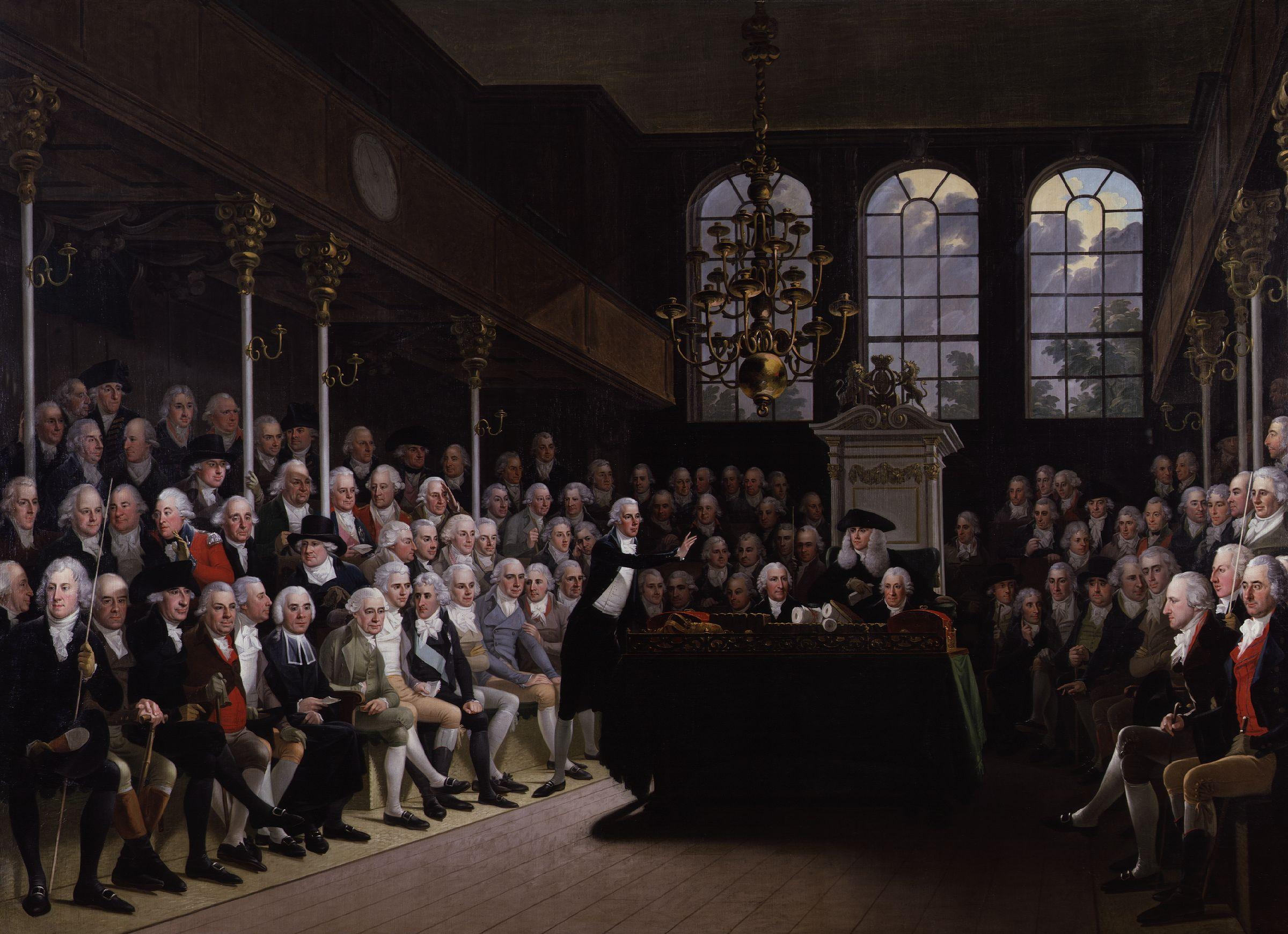
Prime Minister William Pitt the Younger addresses the House of Commons on the War of the First Coalition.

The "unreformed House of Commons" is a name given to the House of Commons of Great Britain (after 1800 the House of Commons of the United Kingdom) before it was reformed by the Reform Act 1832, the Irish Reform Act 1832, and the Scottish Reform Act 1832.

Until the Act of Union of 1707, which united the Kingdoms of Scotland and England to form Great Britain, Scotland had its own Parliament, and the term can be used to refer to the House of Commons of England (which included representatives from Wales from the 16th century). From 1707 to 1801 the term refers to the House of Commons of Great Britain. Until the Act of Union of 1800 joining the Kingdom of Ireland to Great Britain (to form the United Kingdom of Great Britain and Ireland), Ireland also had its own Parliament. From 1801 to 1832, therefore, the term refers to the House of Commons of the United Kingdom.

== Medieval background ==
=== 6th century to 1066 ===
The Witenagemot was the forerunner political institution (that of Anglo-Saxon England) which operated from before the 7th century in at least the Kingdom of Wessex until the 11th century by which time the Kingdom of England was long-established. It was an assembly of the ruling class whose main function was to advise the king; composed of the most key noblemen in England, ecclesiastic and secular. The institution is thought to represent an aristocratic development of the ancient Germanic general assemblies, or folkmoots. In England, by the 7th century, these ancient folkmoots had developed into convocations of the land's most powerful and important people: ealdormen, thegns, and senior clergy, to discuss matters of national and local significance.

Through missionaries (later made saints) sent by Gregory the Great (such as Augustine of Canterbury and Paulinus of York) the seven Anglo-Saxon Kingdoms, mainly with quasi-Witenagemots, officially converted to the church, by the mid-7th century. The panoply of Anglo-Saxon monarchs were then free to arrange marriages into European royalty, which were likewise, from then, became more autocratic while feudal. The role of a consulting forum, overall, declined. In England, cross-sea Viking Kingdoms made raids and soon invasions – such times and places of conflict favoured stronger leadership, and effective autocracy. None more so than the Danelaw, among whose rulers were Cnut the Great, Sveyn Forkbeard and Cnut of Northumbria.

=== 1066 to 1265 ===
The latter's semi-relatives, being the people (predominantly men) of the Norman Conquest, swept aside the remnants of the witenagemots and replaced most of the nobility, while continuing to seize and defend settled lands, vassal states, abroad. These early Norman monarchs thus had an invasive military state ethos, and as conquerors, did not wish to consult with those conquered.

The Normans regularly seized on an orthodoxy of medieval times which ended with ascendant Roundhead philosophies at the start of the Age of Enlightenment. This was, as taught and professed by established people, that sovereignty (including the rulers of ancient tribes and modern kingdoms) was a birthright, by divine grace. Reciting the more worldly origin of kingship: upward from the people, seeing a King's glorification, crowning and ongoing assent to his rulership by successful men-of-arms, most transparent in the Anglo-Saxon Heptarchy, became High Treason. The divine narrative is seized upon in sermons, the practice of orders of chivalry and the words and symbolism throughout coronation ceremonies. Leaders of the church preached that every true and Christian King, who would thus obey God's will and never irreparably defy God, had God's strong blessing. The King (or Queen) was "the Lord's anointed", due obedience from the people. The King however had a duty to act as good shepherd of his people to avoid misery and ruin. Such events were often cited as proof of an evil, illegitimate King by a challenging foreign- or nobility-sponsored kinsman pretender to the throne. Such power struggles placed de facto, but not de jure limits on monarchy. At such times there were few trite constitutional conventions and the calling of a counsel or parliament was no longer routine.

Very wealthy nobility aligned with foreign powers, for example, completely thwarted a cross-kingdom powerhold for the 18 3/4-year reign of Stephen, King of England. This period, the much later-dubbed Anarchy of the 12th century, was foremost among semi-coups and great compromises. These confirmed practical limits on the non-church wealth and power a monarch could seize. From the Magna Carta of 1215 it was becoming accepted, in writing that could be construed as binding law, that a King's duties included the duty to respect and take counsel from feudal magnates.

=== 1265 to 1649 ===
Parliament emerged from such consultations (or parleys), representatives of local communities (the Commons) being added to those of the Lords (peers; senior bishops and all those ennobled, whether for loyalty or gallantry, who generally already had wealth and influence) – a process aided by the practical consideration that it was easier for the King to collect the taxes he needed if the people consented to pay them.

The emergence of petitioning in the reign of Edward I of England (1272–1307) contributed to beginnings of legislative power for the Parliament of England.

Representative men summoned by emerging custom, thus convention, fixed upon two to be selected by each (Parliamentary) borough and two knights of each shire (county). The latter evolved into any two men whom the fairly wealthy of the county selected. The latter electorate became standardised to forty shilling freeholders. Immediately from this, there followed a relative elite who could vote for and lobby both types of representative, so enjoyed plural voting, a relative elite who had single voting, and most other men with no right to vote.

Court-attending or royally invested nobles and the Western church created and perpetuated much historiography – including shrines and hagiography of "good kings" – such as to Edward the Confessor and Edmund the Martyr. Elaborate royal tombs and regular prayers for the dead were features of Windsor Castle, Westminster Abbey and Bury St Edmunds. Until about 1350, King Edmund the Martyr, (pope) Gregory the Great, and King Edward the Confessor were regarded as English national saints, but Edward III preferred the more war-like figure of Saint George, and in 1348 he established the Order of the Garter, him as its patron. At Windsor Castle, its chapel of Saint Edward the Confessor was re-dedicated to Saint George, who was acclaimed three years later patron of the English race or people, where he was revered in later stories and folklore. Such a narrative was orthodoxy in the semi-autocratic reign of Henry VIII – who executed a series of his leading advisors and is used today as a slur for any excessive power, "Henry VIII power", in statute. Laden with wealth from the disappropriated church, he avoided Parliamentary dissent.

The limits of this stance were reached by Charles I of England. Found to be a "tyrant, traitor, murderer, and public enemy to the good people of the nation", his 67 Commissioner-strong trial ordered his beheading after the Civil War, following much Parliamentary sidelining, particularly taxing the people against Parliamentary will. When given the opportunity to speak, Charles refused to enter a plea, claiming that no court had jurisdiction over a monarch. He believed that his own authority to rule had been due to the divine right of kings given to him by God, and by the traditions and laws of England when he was crowned and anointed, and that the power wielded by those trying him was simply that of force of arms. Charles insisted that the trial was illegal, explaining, "No learnèd lawyer will affirm that an impeachment can lie against the King ... one of their maxims is, that the King can do no wrong."

== Composition of the House ==
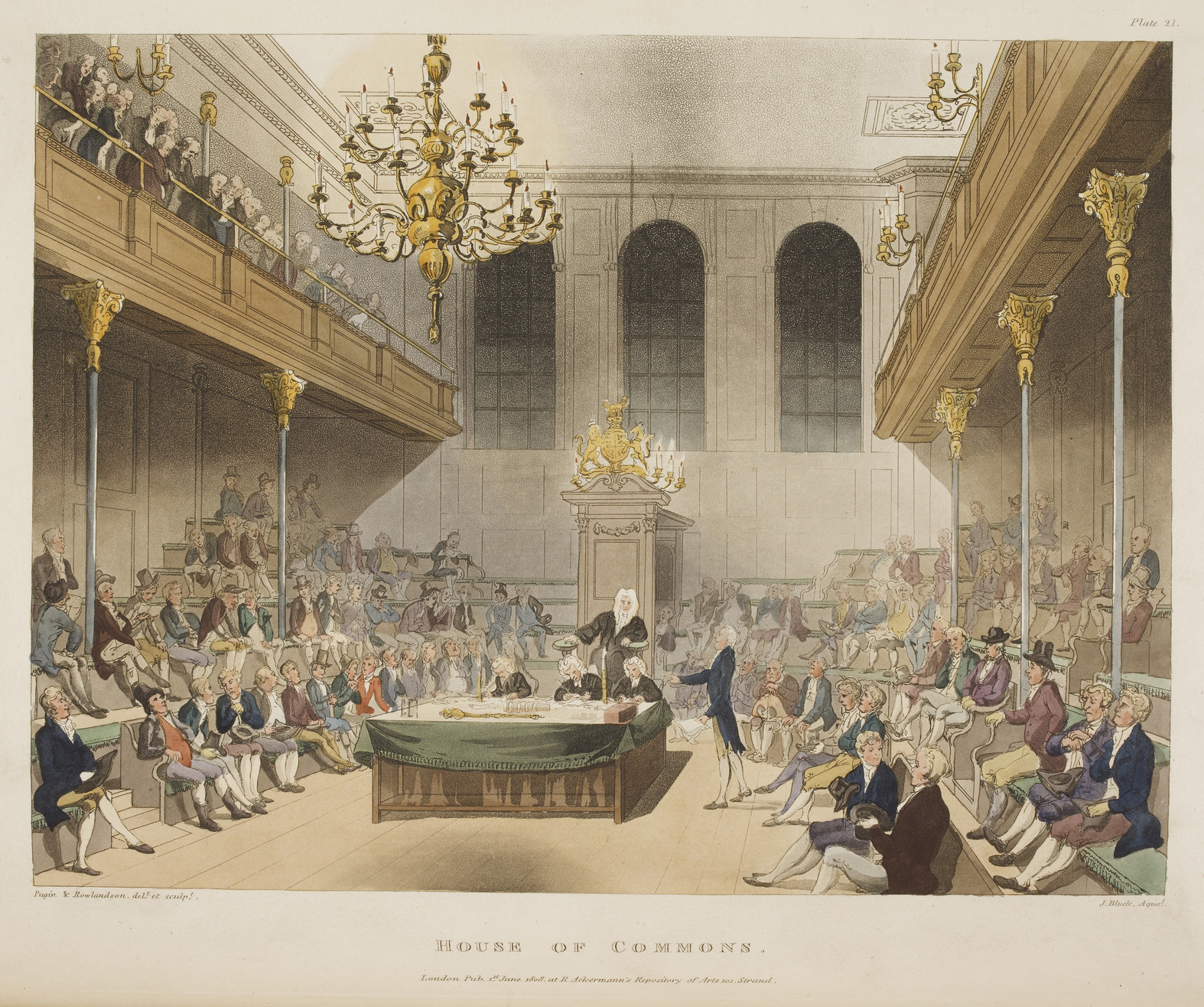
"House of Commons" (from The Microcosm of London, Thomas Rowlandson, 1808)

The House of Commons consisted entirely of men, increasingly of great wealth only, and from 1688 until reform entirely of Anglicans, except in Scotland. Women could neither vote nor stand for election. Members were not paid, which meant that only men of wealth could represent their counties or boroughs. Candidates had to be electors, which meant that in most places they had to have land, mills or businesses.

Virtually all members representing county seats were landed gentry. Many were relatives or dependants of peers. Others were squires with little or no blood relation to other members. These independent country gentlemen were often the chief source of opposition to government and royal edict, since they had little motivation to gain government favour through their votes.

Boroughs also sometimes selected local squires, but more were merchants or urban professionals such as lawyers. A large number of borough members were sponsored into office by the government and thus gave it support: these cronies were known as "placemen", and it was a long-standing objective of parliamentary reformers to eliminate them in the House of Commons. Some were men of little means, in debt or insolvent, who agreed to become placemen for government funds. All 18th century governments depended on this corrupt element to maintain their majorities. Some boroughs were under the control of particular ministers or government departments. Thus those representing the Cinque Ports were, by custom, dependants of the Admiralty and spoke for the interests of the Royal Navy.

There was no direct religious restriction on the right to vote. In practice most Catholics were prevented between the reign of Elizabeth I and the Papists Act 1778, as they could not own or inherit land, making them unable to meet the property requirement. Prominent "recusant" Catholic families such as that of the Duke of Norfolk, until this rule became redundant, circumvented this.

Even after 1778, eligibility for election to the House was restricted by the fact that members had to take an Anglican oath to take their seats. This excluded Catholics, non-Anglican Protestants (English Dissenters), Jews and atheists (This restriction did not apply to Presbyterians in Scotland, where the Church of Scotland was the established church.).

It is a widely held view that the quality of members of the Commons declined over the 250 years before its reform in 1832. This view was one of the stimulants for reform. Sir John Neale could say of the county members in the reign of Elizabeth I: "It was not sufficient for candidates to belong to the more substantial families ... They usually had to show some initiative and will." In the boroughs, he wrote, "competition tended to eliminate the less vigorous, less intelligent and unambitious." This would not be accepted as a description of the situation in the reign of George III, when it was frequently said that the Commons was full of lazy time-servers, talentless dependants of peers, and corrupt placemen and government agents.

The numerical dominance of country gentlemen pervaded. In 1584 they comprised 240 members in a House of 460. Two hundred years later this proportion had hardly changed, even though the social composition of Britain had changed greatly.

The proportion of non-affiliated by blood members declined; sons or close relatives of peers rose at least fourfold. In 1584 only 24 members were sons of peers; by the end of the 18th century this number had risen to about 130 (out of 659, i.e. 19.7%), a fourfold rise in percentage.

In the 18th century about 50 members held ministerial or similar government offices. These included some whom today would be career civil servants: the Secretary of the Admiralty, for example. Other members were given ceremonial court appointments, usually sinecures, as a means of ensuring their loyalty. These included such archaic posts as eight Clerks of the Green Cloth and a dozen Grooms of the Bedchamber, aside from clerkships in government departments, posts which usually involved no actual work. This was not necessarily regarded as corrupt – in an age when Members received neither payments nor pensions, a sinecure was regarded as a legitimate reward for service, but it also served to keep the recipient loyal.

More clearly corrupt was the payment of secret pensions to Members by the Treasury. In 1762 sixteen Members were thus secretly in the pay of the government.

Opposition rhetoric at the time, however, tended to exaggerate the corruption of the 18th century House of Commons and the extent to which governments controlled the House by corrupt means. John Brooke's studies of division lists led him to comment: "The majority of Members voting with Government held no office and did so through honest conviction." The lists show, he said, "that Members were given office because they voted with Government, not that they voted with Government in order to obtain office." As he points out, at a time when there were no formal political parties and hence no party discipline in the House, governments had to resort to other expedients to secure a majority and allow the continuity of government.

=== Summary of the constituencies (1802) ===
Table 1: Constituencies and MPs, by type and country
Country	BC	CC	UC	Total Constituencies	BMP	CMP	UMP	Total MPs	Population (1801)	People per MP
England	202	39	2	243	404	78	4	486	8,331,434	17,142
Wales	13	13	0	26	13	14	0	27	541,546	20,057
Scotland	15	30	0	45	15	30	0	45	1,599,068	35,534
Ireland	33	32	1	66	35	64	1	100	5,500,000	55,000
Total	263	114	3	380	467	176	5	658	16,000,000	24,316 (average population quota)

Table 2: Constituencies grouped by number of seats
Country	Borough			County		University		Total constituencies
SEATS:	1	2	4	1	2	1	2	Total constituencies
England	4	196	2	0	39	0	2	243
Wales	13	0	0	12	1	0	0	26
Scotland	15	0	0	30	0	0	0	45
Ireland	31	2	0	0	32	1	0	66
Total	63	198	2	42	72	1	2	380

=== English county members ===
England had been divided into counties (or shires) since Anglo-Saxon times. These formed the cornerstone of representation, from 1265. Two knights of the shire were chosen to represent each. Before 1536 England had 39 (see list below), thus electing 78 "knights". These "knights" were local landowners who could enjoy courtesy style peerages from their living father or grandfather but lacked a proper peerage (in which case they would be members of the House of Lords). Since Wales was formally annexed to England in 1536, each of the 12 Welsh counties elected one "knight". Monmouthshire, part of the Welsh Marches, became an English county, electing two members, thus making for 92 county members.

To be a candidate or elector for a county seat, a man had to own (not rent) freehold property valued for the land tax at two pounds a year. (Women could neither vote nor be elected.) This was known as the 40 shilling freehold. (There were 20 shillings to the pound). This rule was established by the Electors of Knights of the Shires Act 1429, and as the value of money gradually declined, a slowly increasing number of landowners were admitted to the franchise. By the early 19th century, for example, Yorkshire had more than 20,000 electors, while Kent, Lancashire and Somerset had nearly 10,000 each. By 1831 the English county electorate was estimated at 190,000.

Such members were usually elected without a vote save amid great party strife. In every county was a group of landowning families and these would informally agree on who would stand for the county at an election. Members were often relatives or allies of the peers who owned large portions of the county or its industries. Some counties were represented by the same two or three families for centuries (such as the Lowthers of Westmorland). Sometimes a county would not see a contest for generations. Nottinghamshire, for example, did not see a contested election between 1722 and 1832. Exceptions were Middlesex, an odd concentration of big city merchants, financiers and industrialists for a county – it had several notable contests and the 1784 to 1812 unbroken returns of William Wilberforce for Yorkshire.

=== English borough members ===
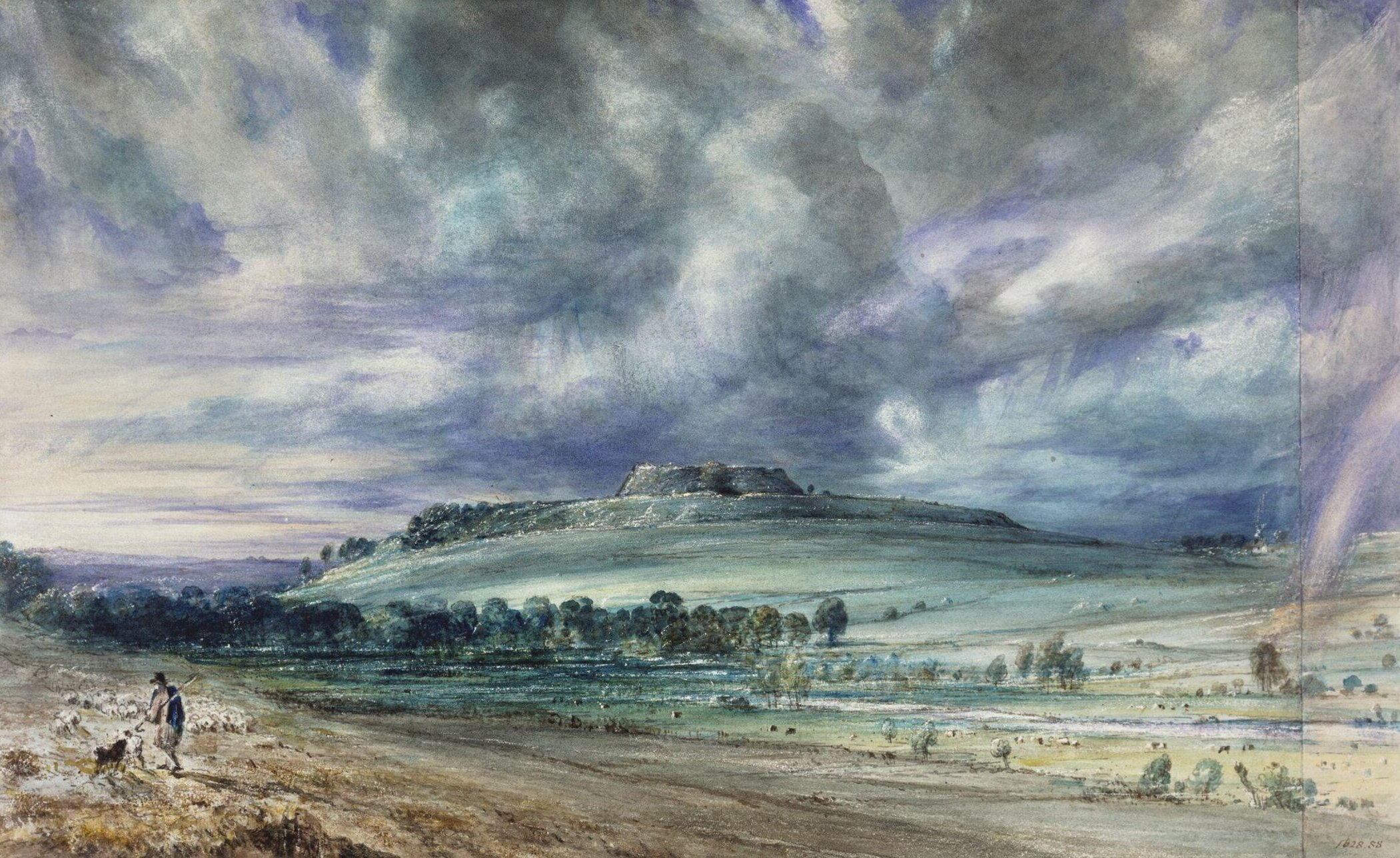
Old Sarum in Wiltshire, an uninhabited hill that elected two Members of Parliament. Old Sarum by John Constable, 1834

Even in medieval times a significant proportion of the King's revenue came from taxes paid by people living in towns, and thus the House of Commons had representatives of boroughs as well as counties from an early date. A borough was a town which usually, but not always, had a royal charter giving it the right to elect two members (known as burgesses) to the House of Commons, though some very ancient boroughs were acknowledged as having prescriptive rights. Five English boroughs elected only one member, while two boroughs – the City of London and the double borough of Weymouth and Melcombe Regis in Dorset – elected four members each. From the 16th century 12 boroughs in Wales elected one member each.

Mediaeval kings could and did grant and revoke charters at their pleasure, often to create seats in the House for their supporters, and frequently regardless of the size or importance of the town. Thus there were "rotten boroughs" (boroughs with very few voters) from very early times, but they increased in number over the years as many old towns lost population. The two most famous examples were Old Sarum, which by the 18th century had no residents at all, and Dunwich in Suffolk, most of which had fallen into the sea. The number of English boroughs fluctuated over time, until the last new borough charter was issued in 1674. From then on the number was fixed at 203, electing 405 members (see list below).

The franchise for borough seats varied enormously. In some boroughs, virtually all adult homeowners could vote. In others, only a handful of landowners could vote. In others, the default maintained, members were chosen by its corporation (council), usually elected by a small group of property owners.

The types of borough franchise were as follows:

Householder boroughs
These were commonly known as "potwalloper" boroughs, because (it was said) anyone who owned a hearth which could boil a pot could vote. In these boroughs all resident male householders who were not receiving alms or poor relief could vote. There were about 12 of these boroughs, including Northampton which had over 1,000 voters even in the 17th century, Preston, others of note, ranging to St Germans in Cornwall, which had only 20 voters.
While the householder boroughs were in theory the most democratic, they were in practice very corrupt, notorious for bribery of voters by candidates and their patrons, frequently with liquor, which made for riotous and expensive elections. At Aylesbury in 1761, the successful candidate simply paid the electors five pounds each for their votes. Sometimes the voters banded together and openly sold the borough to the highest bidder. This usually meant that only the rich and the corrupt could win these dozen seats.
Freeman boroughs
These were boroughs in which the franchise was restricted to "freemen of the borough". There were roughly 92 of these, the largest single group of boroughs. The property qualifications to be a freeman varied widely from place to place. The City of London had about 7,000 freemen in the 18th century, and about 25 other freeman boroughs had at least 1,000 electors, but about 30 boroughs had fewer than 200 electors, and these boroughs were in practice under the control of the town corporation.
In practice the larger freeman boroughs were the most democratic part of the unreformed political system. They were contested at most elections, and the contests were frequently about political issues rather than just about who had the most money to spend. Some of these boroughs were corrupt, and others were controlled by aristocratic patrons, but many freeman boroughs valued their independence. Bristol, the seat of Edmund Burke, was the most notable of these. Most of the larger county towns such as Chester, Gloucester, Leicester, Norwich, Nottingham, Worcester and York were of this type. But some large instances, such as Cambridge, had small and undemocratic electorates because the right to be a freeman was tightly constrained.
Scot and lot boroughs
These were 37 boroughs in which the franchise was restricted to those paying scot and lot, a form of municipal taxation. These boroughs ranged in size from the most democratic borough of all, Westminster, which had 12,000 famously radical voters in the late 18th century and was held by the Whig leader Charles James Fox, down to a rotten borough such as Gatton in Surrey, which in 1831 had two voters. Some of these boroughs were in practice owned by aristocratic patrons or notoriously corrupt.
Corporation boroughs
These 27 boroughs restricted the right to vote to members of the borough corporation. In none of them was the electorate larger than 60, and in most it was much smaller. Apart from Salisbury and Bath, they were mostly small towns. As a result, these boroughs were rarely contested, since the corporation members usually decided among themselves who would be elected. They were usually known as "pocket boroughs" because they were frequently "in the pocket" of a wealthy patron, although they were not as corrupt as the rotten boroughs.
Burgage boroughs
In these 29 boroughs, the right to vote was attached to ownership of certain properties known as burgages – whoever owned a certain house or field had a vote in the borough. Since burgage properties could be bought and sold, these were the easiest boroughs for wealthy patrons to control. In a small burgage borough, a patron who bought all the burgages had absolute control. At election time he would simply convey the burgages to his relatives and friends, and thereby in effect nominate two members of Parliament. These boroughs included the notorious Old Sarum, which had no resident voters at all. As a result, these boroughs were rarely contested, and even more rarely successfully contested.
Freeholder boroughs
In the remaining six boroughs, the right to vote was held by all freeholders. This was in theory quite democratic, but since they were all small towns none of them had electorates larger than 300 even in 1831.

It is not possible to calculate the size of the borough electorate with any accuracy, since many boroughs were rarely contested, and no records were made of eligible voters unless there was a contest. As well, many people owned property in more than one borough and could thus vote more than once (this was called plural voting). The total English electorate is thought to have increased from about 338,000 in the late eighteenth century to some 439,000 at the time of the Reform Act, (or perhaps about 10% of adult males). Of that total, around 45% - 188,000, or slightly less - were in 1831 eligible borough voters.

There was no secret ballot. Until the Ballot Act 1872, the voter openly declared his vote at the hustings, a public occasion, where it was recorded. That meant that the patron who dominated a borough knew how the qualified electors had voted. Even if the franchise was broad, as in a potwalloper or scot and lot borough, a small electorate could be controlled by a combination of patronage, bribes and threats. The relatively democratic constituencies combined a broad franchise with a numerous electorate.

=== University members ===
The two ancient universities of Cambridge and Oxford elected two members each from 1603. The franchise was restricted to holders of doctoral and master's degrees, which excluded the great bulk of graduates (mostly Anglican clergy) holding bachelor's degrees. Both universities had about 500 electors in the 18th century, rising to 800 by 1832, but at most elections a much smaller number actually voted. After the Act of Union of 1801, Dublin University also elected one member.

=== Welsh members ===
The twelve Welsh counties (Monmouthshire was treated as English) elected one member each, on the same franchise as English counties. Since Wales was much poorer than England, however, the county electorates were much smaller. The Welsh county electorate was about 19,000 in 1800. The twelve Welsh boroughs also elected one member each. These were Haverfordwest and eleven county towns. (Merionethshire had no parliamentary borough). In many counties, other towns were contributory boroughs sharing in the election of the county town's member. Until the late 18th century all of them, principal or contributory, were very small towns. The franchises for the Welsh boroughs were freemen, scot and lot and corporation, but in practice they were under the control of local patrons and contested elections were rare.

=== Scottish members ===
The Act of Union of 1707 brought 45 Scottish members to the House of Commons, of which 30 were elected by the 33 Scottish counties, while 15 were elected from the Scottish boroughs (called burghs in Scotland). The electoral system which had operated in the Scottish Parliament since its creation was preserved for the election of Scotland's representatives at Westminster.

Twenty-seven counties elected one member each (this included Orkney and Shetland, which were strictly speaking not counties but fiefs of the Crown, but were treated as if they were a county). The six smallest counties were grouped together into three groups of two (Buteshire and Caithness, Clackmannanshire and Kinross-shire, and Nairnshire and Cromartyshire), with one of each pair electing a member at alternate elections.

The Scottish county franchise was even more restrictive than for the English counties. A voter either had to own land worth the equivalent of two pounds sterling "of old extent" – meaning that the land had to have had that value since the creation of the Scottish Parliament in the 13th century – or to hold as a Crown tenant land to the value of 35 pounds sterling. This restricted the franchise to a handful of wealthy landowners, small privileged sets who might not even represent the county's true landed wealth. In most counties there were fewer than 100 voters, and in some even less: in Sutherlandshire the Duke of Sutherland owned almost the entire county, and all the voters were his tenants, while in Orkney and Shetland there were seven voters in 1759. The total Scottish county electorate was fewer than 3,000 in 1800.

The 15 Scottish burghs consisted of the city of Edinburgh, where the 33 members of the city corporation elected a member, and 14 districts of burghs, each a group of four or five smaller burghs electing one member between them. The franchise in the groups of burghs was held by the corporations of each of the burghs making up the group, the corporations being self-co-opting oligarchies. Each burgh corporation would choose a delegate, and the delegates would then meet to elect the member. The representation tended to rotate among the burghs in each group. Since most of the burghs were little more than villages, the leading county families could usually bribe the corporation members to get their nominees elected.

Government patronage in Scotland early ensured a docile parliamentary following; and by mid-century the government of the day could usually count on a solid phalanx of Scottish supporters. Subsequently, under Pitt, Henry Dundas, the Scottish agent of the Tory party, had little difficulty in manipulating the Scottish representation in similar fashion, spending government funds and using Indian patronage to ensure that Tories were elected. This was one reason why the Scottish members were unpopular at Westminster, being regarded as corrupt even by the standards of the day, as well as uncouth.

On the eve of Reform, Lord John Russell estimated that a Scottish electorate of some 3,600 would undergo an increase of around 60,000 voters. Later figures suggest an increase from 4,579 to 64,447 voters actually took place. Either way, G. M. Trevelyan's conclusion seems justified that "The Reform Bill, in England an evolution, in Scotland was a revolution, veiled in the form of law".

=== Irish members ===
The Act of Union 1800 brought 100 Irish members to the House of Commons from 1 January 1801. The 32 Irish counties elected two members each, 33 boroughs elected 35 members (each elected one member except Dublin and Cork, which elected two), and Dublin University elected one member. The franchise in the counties was the same as for England, and the total Irish county electorate, at about 220,000 in 1801, was actually larger than the English county electorate (Ireland had a larger population relative to England than it has today, and had a larger rural gentry).

The property threshold for county constituencies was significantly raised under the Parliamentary Elections (Ireland) Act 1829, enacted on the same day that the Roman Catholic Relief Act 1829 permitted Catholics to sit in parliament.

In 1801, Ireland had about one-third of the population of the United Kingdom (5.5 million people lived in Ireland and 10.5 million in Great Britain) but only 15% of the MPs (100 of 658) were Irish.

Of the Irish boroughs, only Dublin, Cork, Kilkenny, Londonderry and Waterford had a mass electorate. Belfast's member was elected by the city corporation and the seat was never contested.

The exclusion of Catholics from the House of Commons was of most consequence in Ireland, where 80% of the population were Catholic. At the time of the Act of Union, the Irish were promised that the restriction on Catholics would be lifted but this promise was broken because of the opposition of George III. This meant that most Irishmen, regardless of wealth, were excluded from politics until Catholic emancipation was finally achieved in 1829.

== Unrepresented towns ==
Since the distribution of seats in the House of Commons among the boroughs was based on medieval demography and economy, much in it was already anomalous under 18th century circumstances. Thus for example 1/4 of the House was elected by only five counties in South West England (Cornwall alone having 44 Members due to rotten and pocket boroughs); while almost 1/3 of boroughs consisted of (often decayed) seaports.

With the Industrial Revolution of the early 19th century, the numbers and weight of those outside the system increased further. While an uninhabited hill such as Old Sarum in Wiltshire elected two members of Parliament, cities including Manchester, Birmingham, Leeds, Sheffield, Bolton, Bradford and Huddersfield had no direct representation. Residents of these cities who met the 40 shilling freehold test could vote in their respective counties, and this explains why the county electorate in industrial counties like Yorkshire and Lancashire grew rapidly, but the bulk of the fast-growing urban middle class remained voteless.

In addition, Glasgow in Scotland – which grew into a major industrial and commercial centre in the 18th century, increasing in numbers from some twelve thousand to eighty thousand – although technically represented in the House of Commons, was part of a district of burghs that meant it was in practice without representation, and since none of its citizens met the county franchise none of them had a direct vote. Some other industrial towns which elected members but with a very narrow franchise were in the same situation: Wigan, for example, had 10,000 people in 1800 but only 100 electors, while residents of the fast-growing London suburbs which later became known as the commuter belt were also unrepresented unless they met the county franchise to vote in Middlesex, Essex, Hertfordshire, Surrey or Kent.

== Movements for reform ==
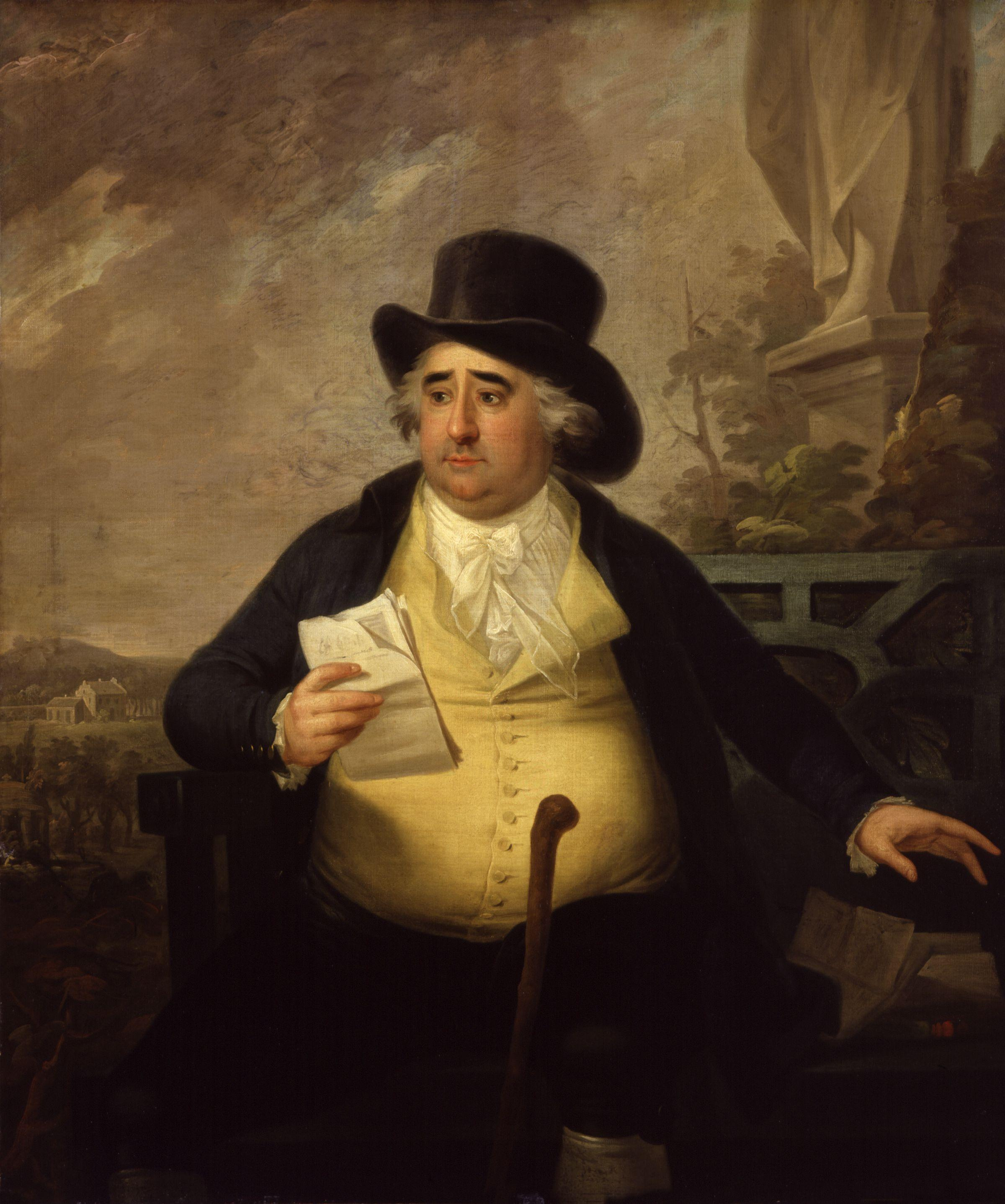
Portrait of Charles James Fox by Anton Hickel, 1794

The English Civil War of the 1640s produced a series of debates over reforming the electoral system – involving the franchise, the distribution of the House of Commons seats, and the abolition of the House of Lords. At the Putney Debates of 1647, radicals led by Thomas Rainborough argued for manhood suffrage; conservatives, led by Oliver Cromwell and Henry Ireton, maintained that the vote should rather go only to those they regarded as having a 'stake' in the country. The Cromwellian system that eventually emerged featured a modest increase in the franchise, and a sharp reduction in the overall number of seats, with a shift in balance to county over borough members. There was also a redistribution of borough seats from the West and South-West to Eastern England.

With the Restoration of the monarchy of 1660, however, came a restoration of the pre-revolutionary system in its entirety, thereafter sanctified as the Ancient Constitution; and the Glorious Revolution of 1688 saw no attempt to re-open the question. There followed a long period during which any challenge to the system of representation was equated with republicanism and treason; and the political classes remained largely content with the alliance of landowners, urban merchants, and small town electorates which underpinned it.

A reform movement began in the mid-18th century, with the Yorkshire Association attempting to increase county representation at the expense of the rotten boroughs; but with the failure of Pitt's Reform Bill of 1785 it came to an end. Thereafter new reformist strands arose, with Nonconformists looking to improve their civil position through Parliamentary reform, a radical working-class campaign which demanded manhood suffrage (or even universal suffrage), and support from some in the Whig party like Fox and Earl Grey through the Society of the Friends of the People (1792). However Tory resistance, and the English reaction against the excesses of the French Revolution, stifled all real attempts to raise the issue until the end of the Napoleonic Wars in 1815.

With peace came a renewed call for reform in the shape of the spreading Hampden Clubs, but government reaction called a swift halt to them, and soon the pamphleteer William Hone concluded that "Parliamentary reform is not perhaps dead, but it is dying".

1822-3 saw agricultural distress leading to a short-lived movement for strengthening the counties at the expense of the boroughs. The disenfranchisement for corruption by Lord Liverpool's of Grampound in Cornwall, when the borough's patron had been convicted of bribery, saw its two seats given to Yorkshire, which thus elected four county members from 1826 to 1832. A few years later East Retford was also disfranchised but its seats were transferred to the neighbouring hundred of Bassetlaw rather than to one of the new cities.

As late as 1829, however, parliamentary reform remained a marginal issue for most people, both inside and outside parliament. Even those - like county landowners in those counties which contained the unrepresented cities, such as Yorkshire, who were increasingly finding themselves outvoted in their own counties by urban voters, or Whigs like Lord John Russell - who favoured reform, did so not for democracy, but to make the system a better reflection of national interests (that is to say, property), rather than numbers. This, and not a desire for democracy, was why most Whigs and even some Tories turned against the old system during the 1820s.

== End of the unreformed House ==
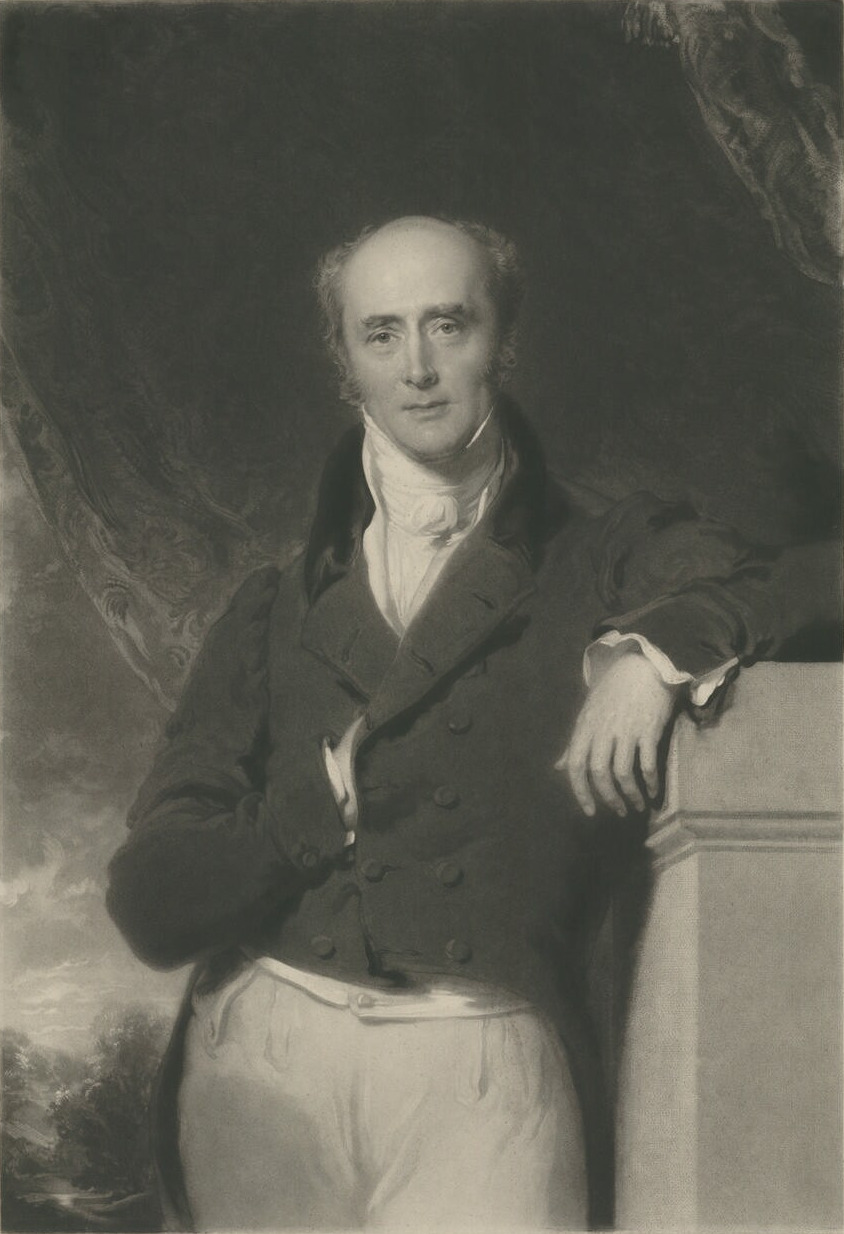
Earl Grey

The issue which brought parliamentary reform to the forefront once more was the Roman Catholic Relief Act 1829, which removed barriers to Catholics being elected to the House of Commons, and which led many Anglican conservatives, the Ultra-Tories in particular, to favour abolition of the rotten boroughs so as to make Parliament more truly representative of (Anglican) county, squire and parson. Similarly, it was a Tory, Thomas Attwood, who in 1830 founded the Birmingham Political Union to press for reform. The accession of a new, and less hide-bound monarch precipitated a general election, which – galvanized by news of the French Revolution of 1830 with its middle-class power-brokers – produced a swing of 30 seats against Wellington's Government, to a coalition (including the Ultras) on 15 November.

Earl Grey formed a ministry pledged to reform. In March 1831, the bill passed second reading by a single vote; forces were about balanced. When a hostile amendment was passed by eight votes, Grey sought and was granted a dissolution of parliament, asking for a fresh mandate in April 1831. At this election the Whigs won a landslide – a result that, as Elie Halevy put it, "by its condemnation of the existing franchise went near to justify the plea of its Tory defenders". In 35 of the 40 English counties they won both seats and in the boroughs where electors were able to decide they made an almost clean sweep. Of the 230 seats the Tories held after that election, most were in rotten or "closed" boroughs or else in Scotland, which had almost no broad-based electorates. By one reckoning, the Tories seats held 50,000 voters, while the four Whig members for Yorkshire held 100,000 voters. After the decisive electorate's mandate, the House of Lords rejected the Second Reform Bill. A barrage of popular protests and a constitutional crisis followed, before the King's agreement to create the necessary number of new peers to pass the Reform made the Lords give way, and the Great Reform Act was passed.

The Reform Act extended the franchise from about 435,000 to about 652,000 voters in Great Britain. Setting itself out explicitly as a final settlement of the reform process, it disfranchised many rotten boroughs (56 boroughs were abolished, while another 30 were reduced from two members to one), gave seats to new boroughs and additional seats to the more populous counties, reformed the electoral system in Scotland, and introduced a uniform borough franchise. While pockets of landlord influence, voter deference, corruption, and pocket boroughs were left and still a far cry from universal suffrage of men (perhaps 1 in 5 of whom could vote in 1833), the Great Reform Act was – at least to Whig and Radical historians like G. M. Trevelyan – the decisive step in ending the old system.

== See also ==
- List of counties and boroughs of the unreformed House of Commons in 1800

== Sources ==
- Porritt, Edward (1903). The Unreformed House of Commons; Parliamentary representation before 1832. Vol. 1: England and Wales. Cambridge University Press.
- Porritt, Edward (1909). The Unreformed House of Commons; Parliamentary representation before 1832. Vol. 2: Scotland and Ireland. Cambridge University Press.
- Brooke, John (1964). The House of Commons 1754–1790. Oxford University Press.
- Cannon, John (1973). Parliamentary Reform 1640–1832. Cambridge University Press.
- Neale, J. E. (1949). The Elizabethan House of Commons. Jonathan Cape. ISBN 9780224605144.
- Thorne, R. G. (1986). The House of Commons 1790–1820. Vol. II: Constituencies. Secker and Warburg.
- Hampsher-Monk, Iain (1979). "Civic Humanism and Parliamentary Reform: The Case of the Society of the Friends of the People". Journal of British Studies. 18 (2): 70–89. doi:10.1086/385738. JSTOR 175513. S2CID 143821652.
