= Plymouth =

City and unitary authority in Devon, England

- City and unitary authority
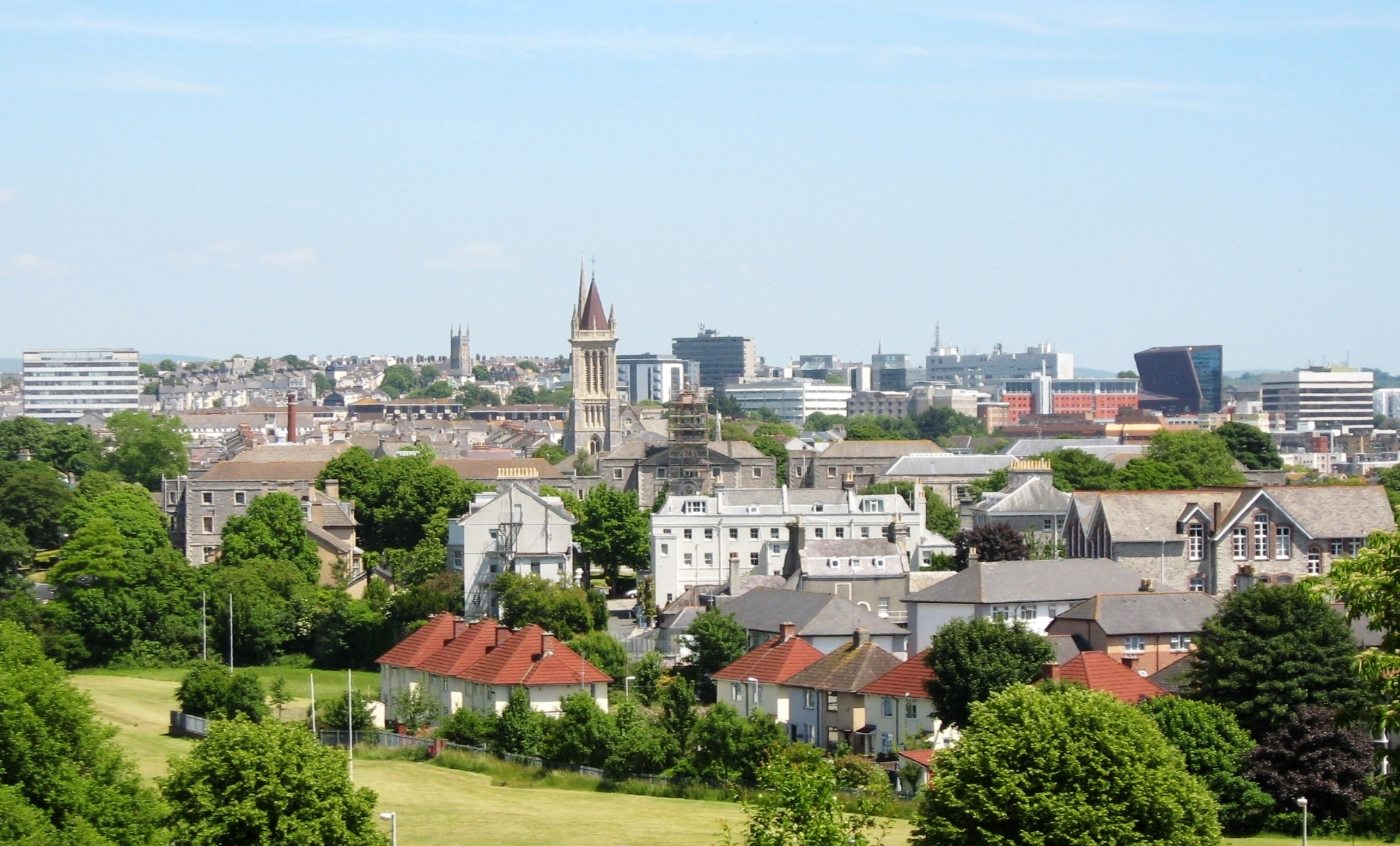
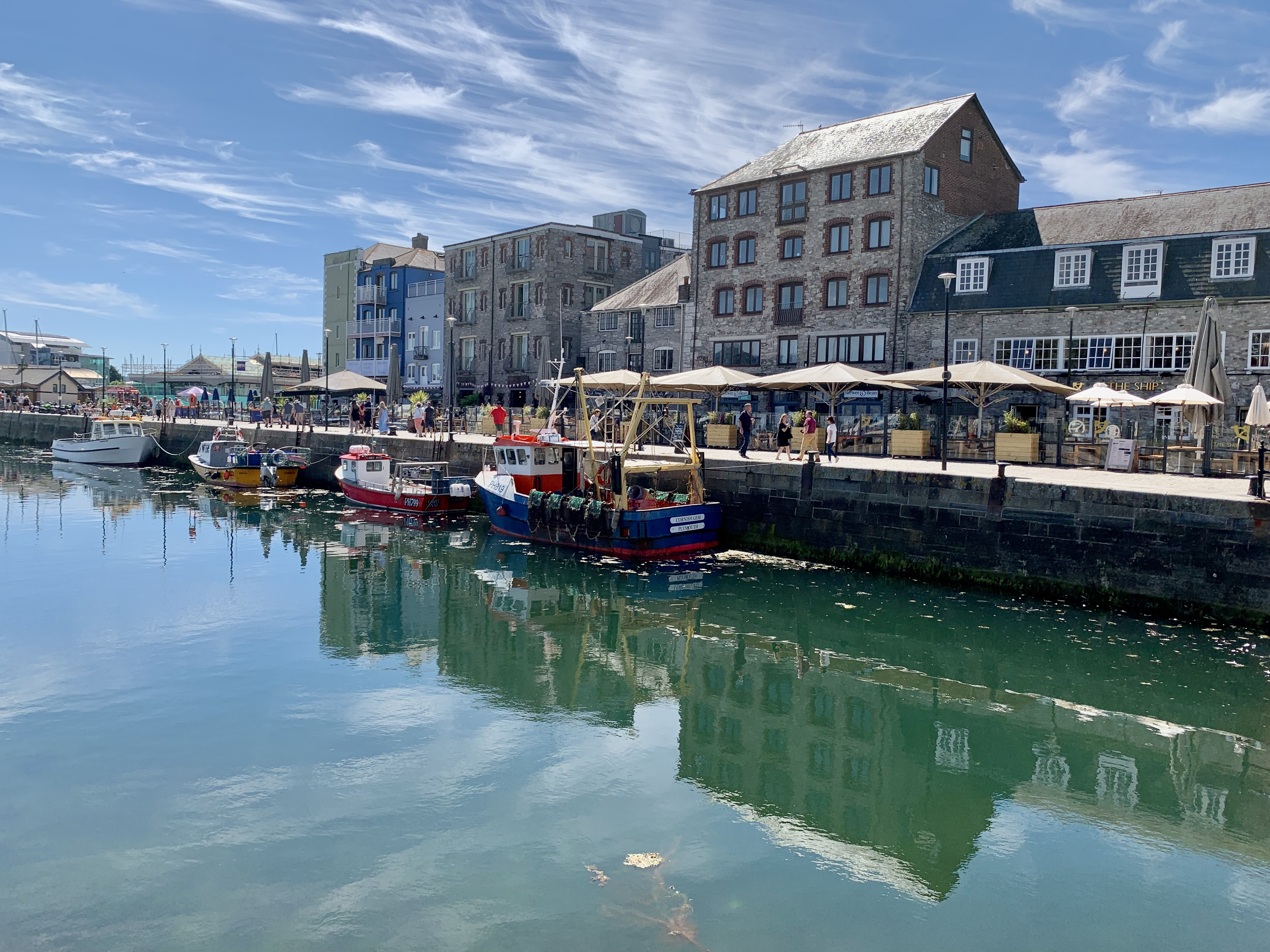
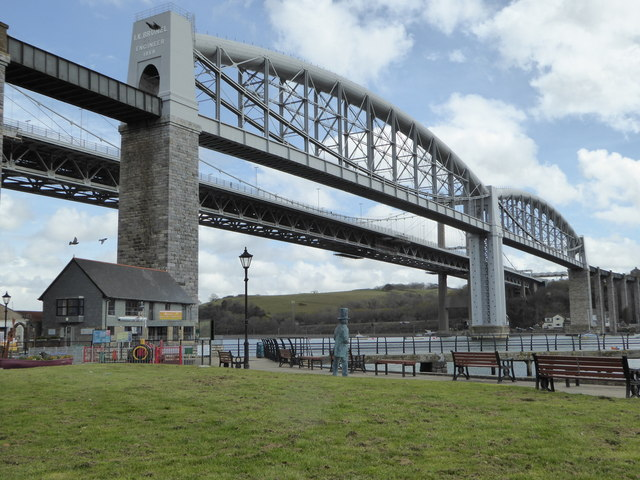
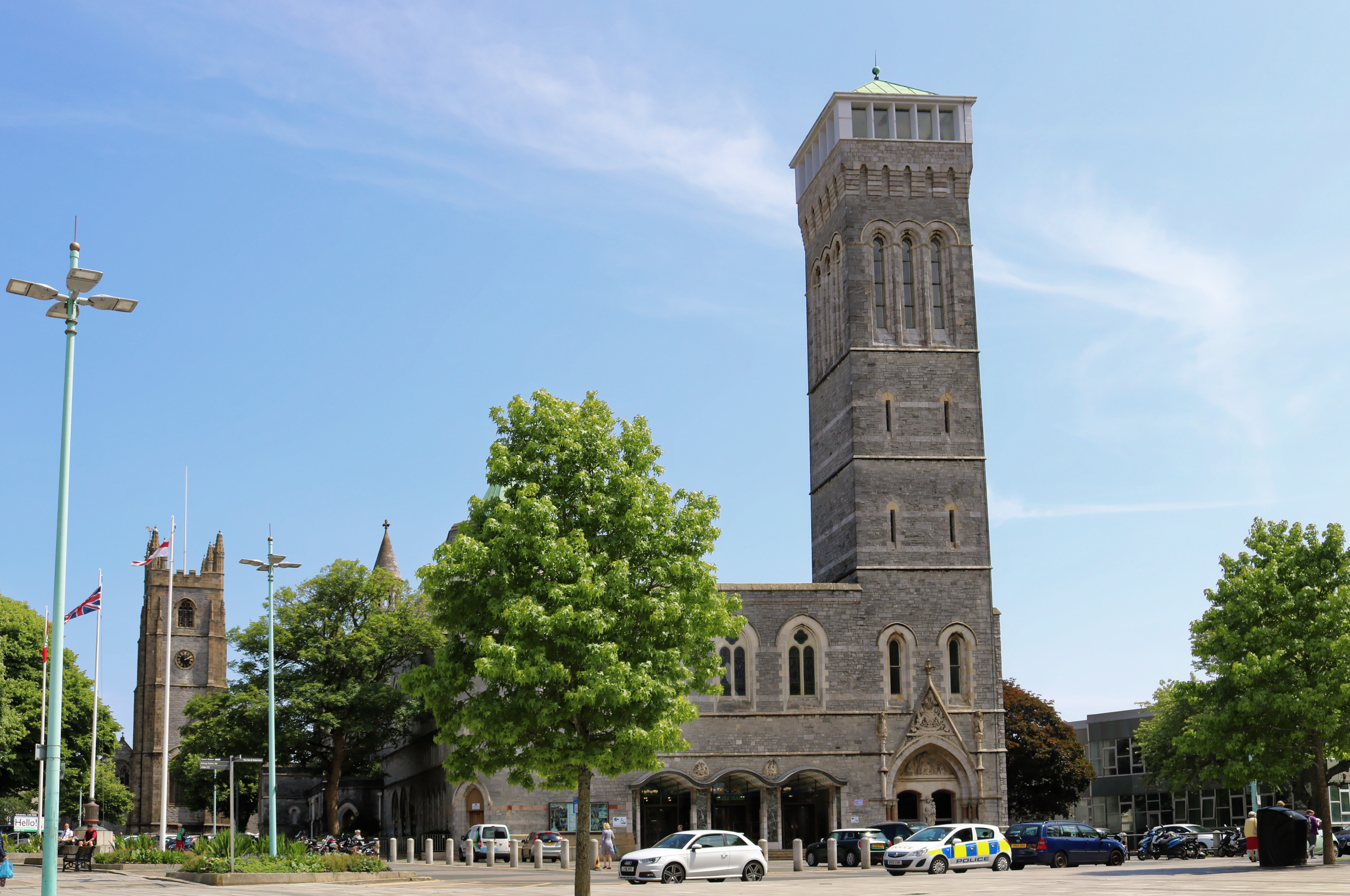
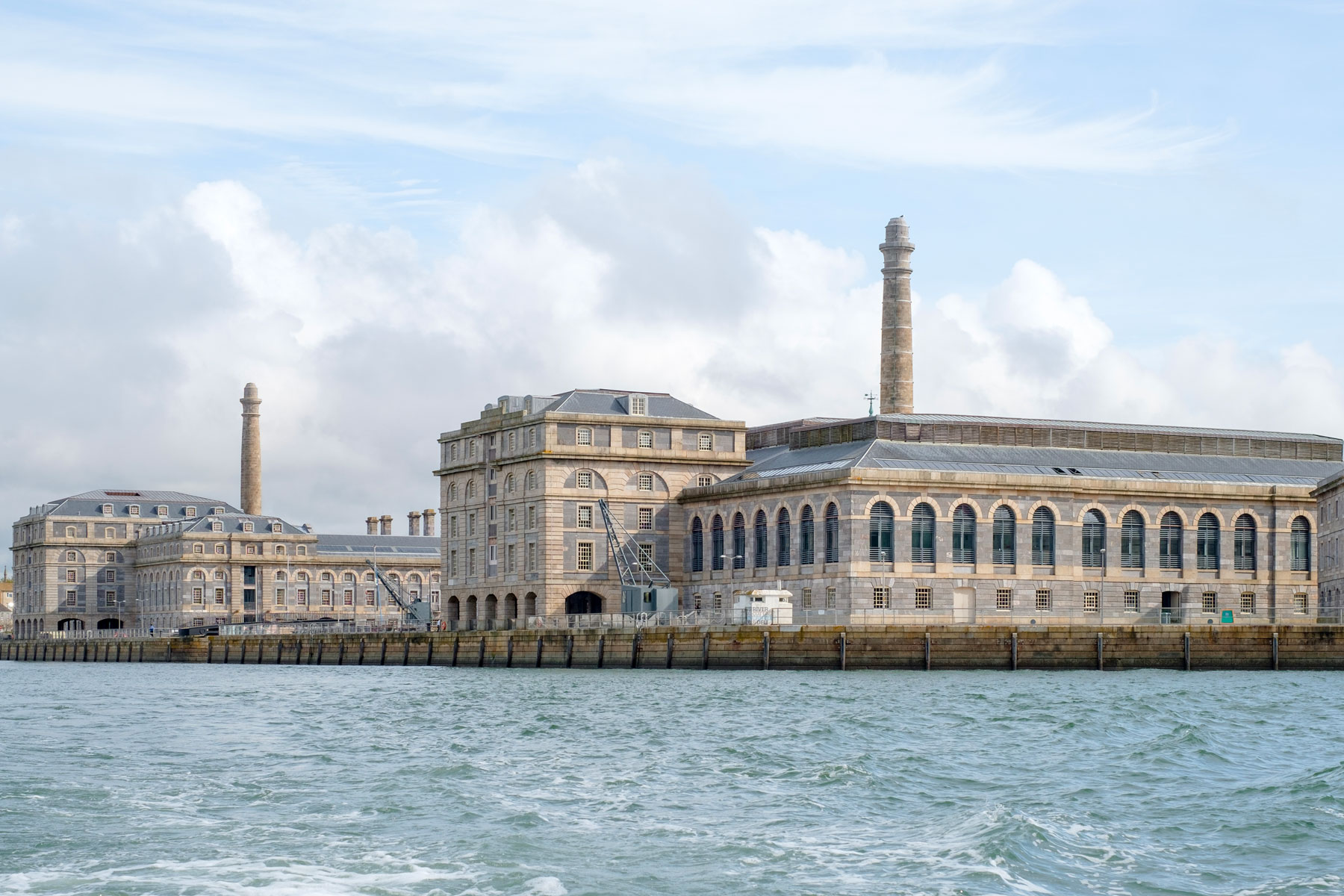
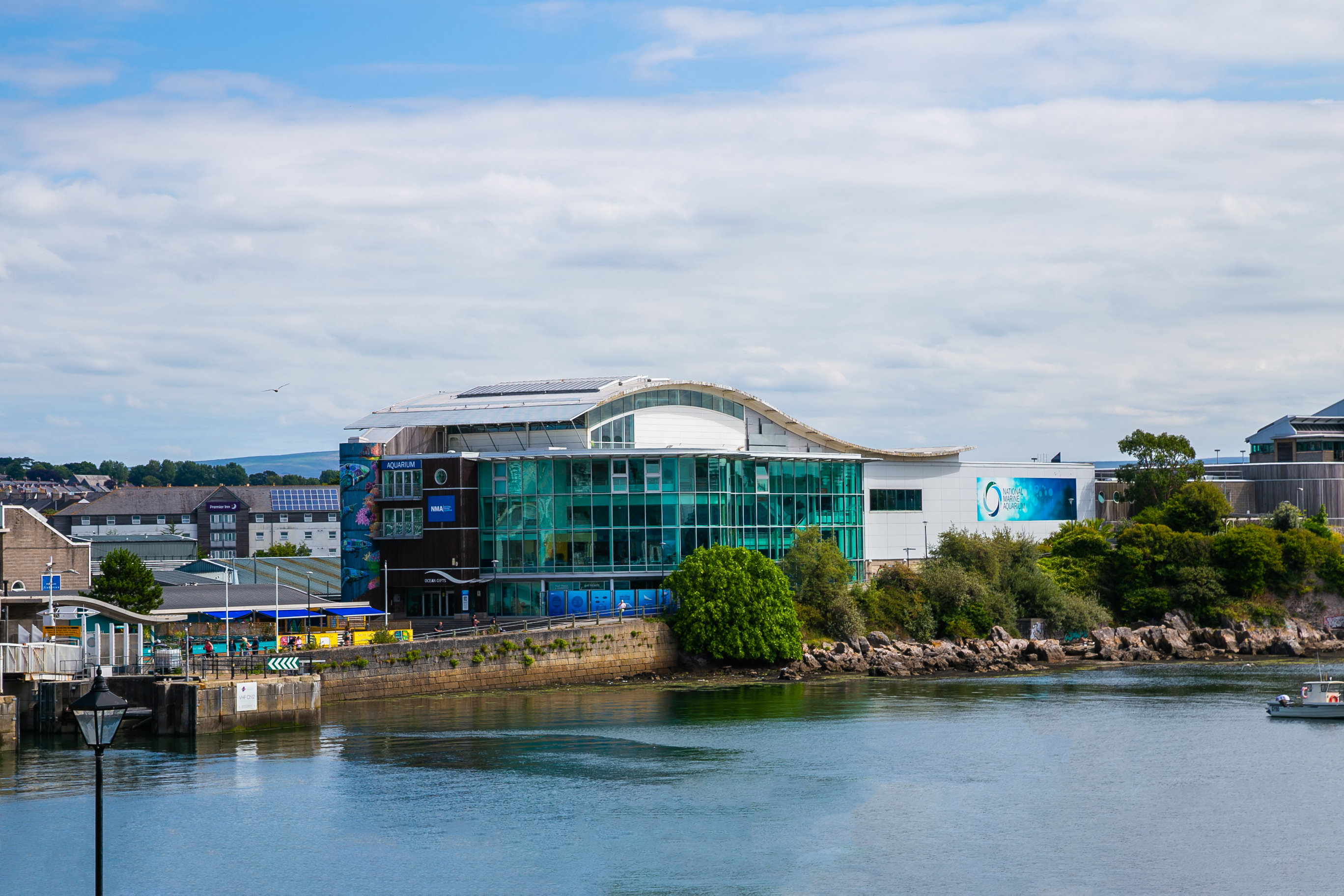
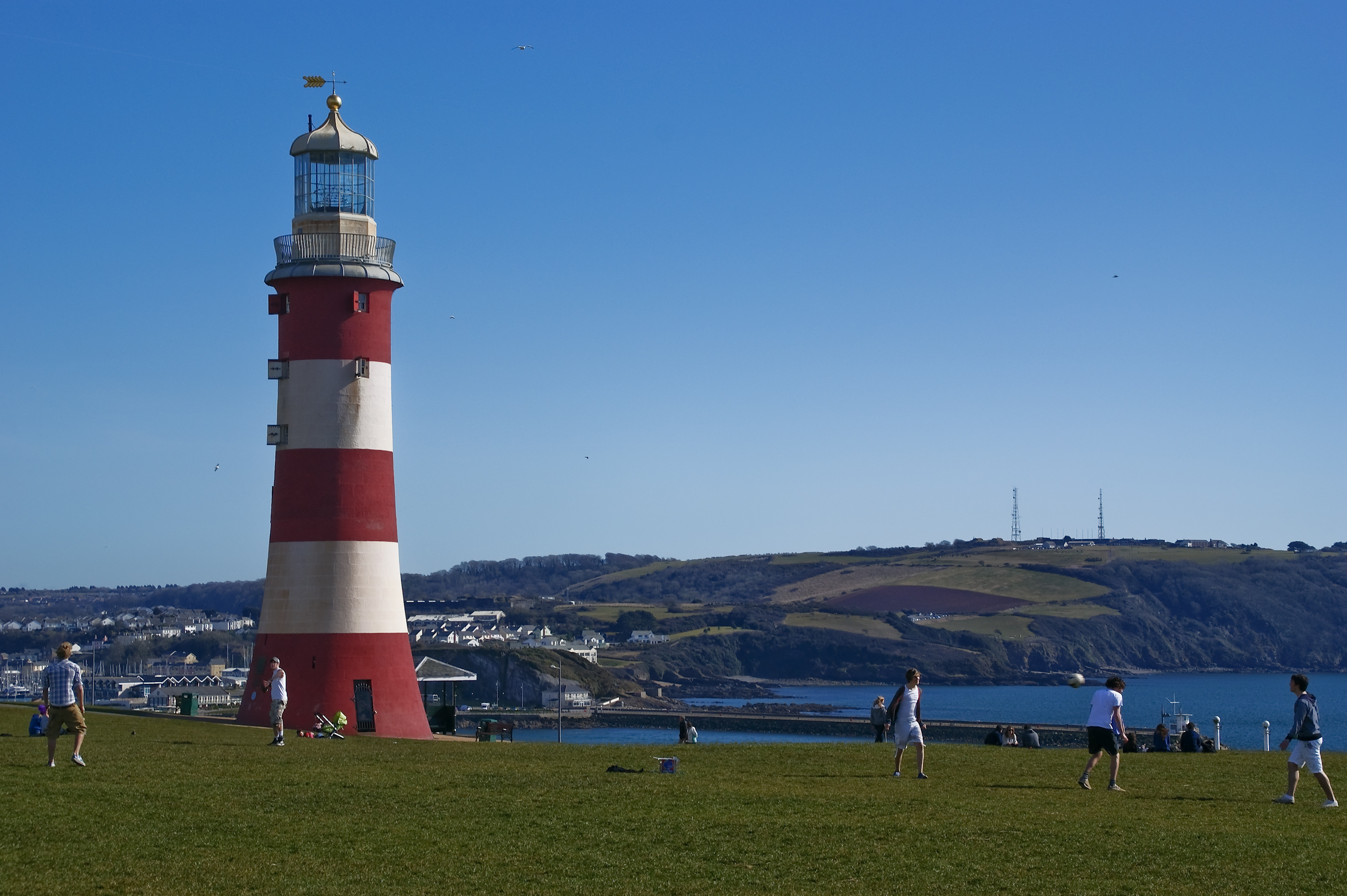
- Plymouth's skyline Barbican Royal Albert Bridge The Guildhall and The Minster Church Royal William Yard National Marine Aquarium Plymouth Hoe

- Flag
- Nickname: Britain's Ocean City
- Motto: Turris fortissima est nomen Jehova "The name of Jehovah is the strongest tower."
- Shown within Devon

- Location within England Location within the United Kingdom Location in Europe
- Coordinates: 50°22′17″N 4°08′32″W
- Sovereign state: United Kingdom
- Country: England
- Region: South West England
- Ceremonial county: Devon
- City status: 1928
- Unitary authority: 1998
- Areas of the city: List: Barne Barton; Cattedown; Compton; Crabtree; Crownhill; Devonport (Note: One of the Three Towns of Plymouth.); Drake; Efford; Eggbuckland; Ernesettle; Estover; Greenbank; Ham; Hartley; Hooe; Honicknowle; Keyham; King's Tamerton; Laira; Leigham; Lipson; Manadon; Mannamead; Milehouse; Millbay; Millbridge; Morice Town; North Prospect; Pennycomequick; Pennycross; Peverell; Plymouth; Plympton; Plymstock; Roborough; St Budeaux; Southway; Stoke; Stonehouse; Tamerton Foliot; West Hoe; Weston Mill; Whitleigh; Woolwell

Government
  - Type: Unitary authority
  - Body: Plymouth City Council
  - Leadership: Tudor Evans
  - Council control: Labour (Note: As of 4 July 2023.)
  - MPs: Fred Thomas (L), Luke Pollard (L), Rebecca Smith (C)

Area
  - District: 31 sq mi (80 km^{2})
  - Rank: 215th (of 296)
- Highest elevation: 509 ft (155 m)
- Lowest elevation: 0 ft (0 m)

Population (2025)
  - District: 271,361
  - Rank: 70th (of 296)
  - Density: 8,800/sq mi (3,400/km^{2})
  - Metro: 300,983
  - Demonyms: Plymothian (formal); Janner (informal)

Ethnicity (2021)
  - Ethnic groups: List: 94% White; 2.2% Asian; 1.7% Mixed; 1% Black; 0.3% other

Religion (2021)
  - Religion: List: 51.8% no religion; 45.3% Christianity; 1.4% Islam; 0.6% other; 0.4% Buddhism; 0.3% Hinduism; 0.1% Sikhism; 0.1% Judaism
- Time zone: UTC0 (GMT)
  - Summer (DST): UTC+1 (BST)
- Postcode district: PL1–9
- Area code: 01752
- ISO 3166 code: GB-PLY
- Police: Devon and Cornwall
- Ambulance: South Western
- Fire: Devon and Somerset
- Website: www.plymouth.gov.uk

Plymouth (/ˈplɪ.məθ/ PLIM-əth) is a port city and unitary authority in Devon, England. It is located on the county's south coast between the rivers Plym and Tamar, about 36 miles (58 km) south-west of Exeter and 193 miles (311 km) south-west of London. It is the most populous settlement in Devon.

Plymouth's history extends back to the Bronze Age, evolving from a trading post at Mount Batten into the thriving market town of Sutton, which was formally renamed Plymouth in 1439 when it was made a borough. The settlement has played a significant role in English history, notably in 1588 when an English fleet based there defeated the Spanish Armada and in 1620 as the departure point for the Pilgrim Fathers to the New World. During the English Civil War, the town was held by the Parliamentarians and was besieged between 1642 and 1646. In 1690, a dockyard was established on the Tamar for the Royal Navy and Plymouth grew as a commercial shipping port throughout the Industrial Revolution.

After absorbing nearby settlements in 1914, the borough was awarded city status in 1928. During World War II, it suffered extensive damage in the Plymouth Blitz, leading to post-war rebuilding that significantly shaped its modern appearance. A further expansion of its boundaries in 1967 contributed to its current status as the 30th-most populous built-up area in the UK and the second-largest city in the South West after Bristol, with a population in 2025 of 271,361.

Plymouth's economy, historically grounded in shipbuilding and seafaring, has transitioned towards a service-based economy since the 1990s. It maintains strong maritime connections, hosting HMNB Devonport, the largest operational naval base in Western Europe, and offering ferry links to Brittany and Spain. The city is also home to the University of Plymouth, reflecting its educational and cultural significance. Today, the city is governed locally by Plymouth City Council and is represented nationally by three MPs.

== History ==
=== Early history ===
Upper Palaeolithic deposits, including bones of Homo sapiens have been found in local caves, and artefacts dating from the Bronze Age to the Middle Iron Age have been found at Mount Batten, showing that it was one of few principal trading ports of pre-Roman Britannia dominating continental trade with Armorica. An unidentified settlement named Tamari Ostts (Note: Mouth/estuaries of the Tamar.) is listed in Ptolemy's Geographia and is presumed to be located in the area of the modern city. An ancient promontory fort was located at Rame Head at the mouth of Plymouth Sound with ancient hillforts located at Lyneham Warren to the east, Boringdon Camp and Maristow Camp to the north.

The settlement of Plympton, further up the river Plym than the current Plymouth, was also an early trading port. (Note: See Plympton for the derivation of the name Plym.) As the river silted up in the early 11th century, mariners and merchants were forced to settle downriver, at the current day Barbican near the river mouth. At the time this village was called Sutton, meaning south town in Old English. The name Plym Mouth, meaning "mouth of the river Plym" was first mentioned in a Pipe Roll of 1211. Plympton Priory owned land at Sutton and secured a charter from Henry III in 1254 granting the priory the right to hold a weekly market and annual fair at Sutton, making it a market town.

=== Early defence and Renaissance ===
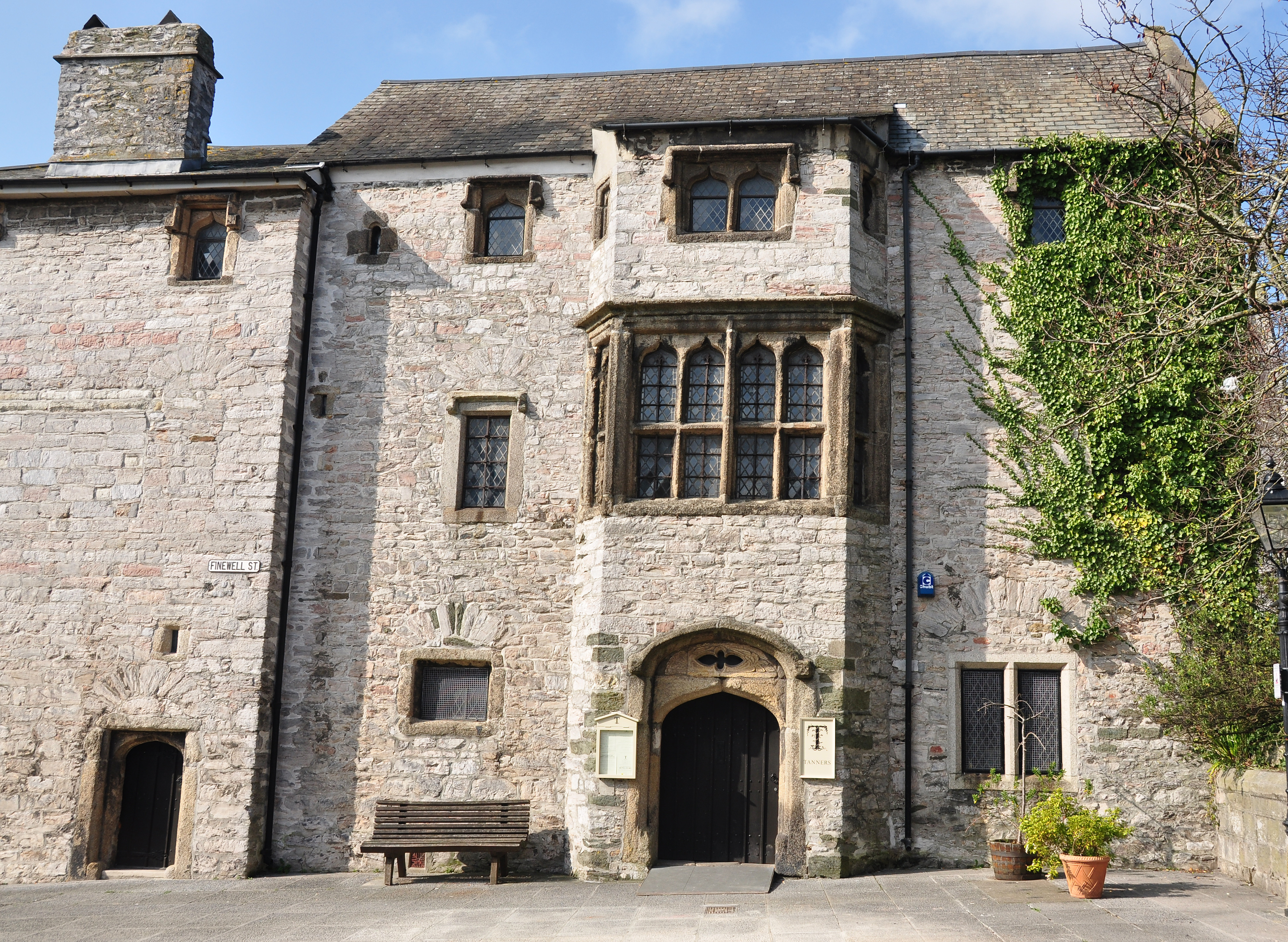
Prysten House (1498) on Finewell Street is the oldest surviving house in Plymouth, built from local Plymouth limestone and Dartmoor granite

During the Hundred Years' War, a French attack in 1340 burned a manor house and took some prisoners, but failed to get into the town. The town was burned by Breton raiders in 1403. On 12 November 1439, the market town of Sutton was incorporated as a borough and was formally renamed 'Plymouth', with a subsequent charter the following year formalising its boundaries. It was the first time a borough charter had been issued by parliament, rather than directly from the monarch.

In the late 15th century, Plymouth Castle, a "castle quadrate", was constructed close to the area now known as The Barbican; it included four round towers, one at each corner, as featured on the city coat of arms.

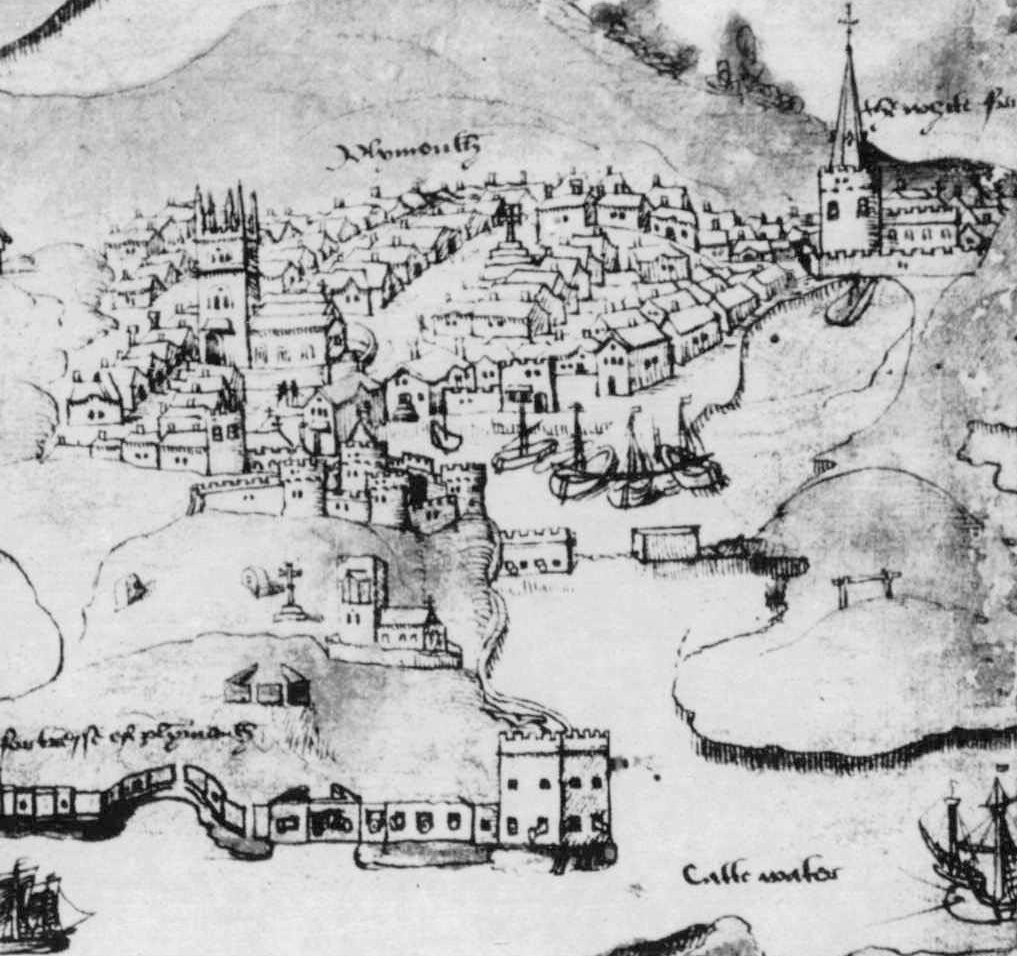
Charter map of Sutton harbour and Plymouth in 1540

The castle served to protect Sutton Pool, which is where the fleet was based in Plymouth prior to the establishment of Plymouth Dockyard. An act of Parliament, the Fortification of Plymouth Act 1512 (4 Hen. 8. c. 20), was passed to further fortify Plymouth. The work included defensive walls at the entrance to Sutton Pool, across which a chain was extended in times of danger. Defences on St Nicholas Island also date from this time, and a string of six artillery blockhouses were built, including one on Fishers Nose at the south-eastern corner of the Hoe. This location was further strengthened by the building of a fort (later known as Drake's Fort) in 1596; it was the site of the Citadel, established in the 1660s.

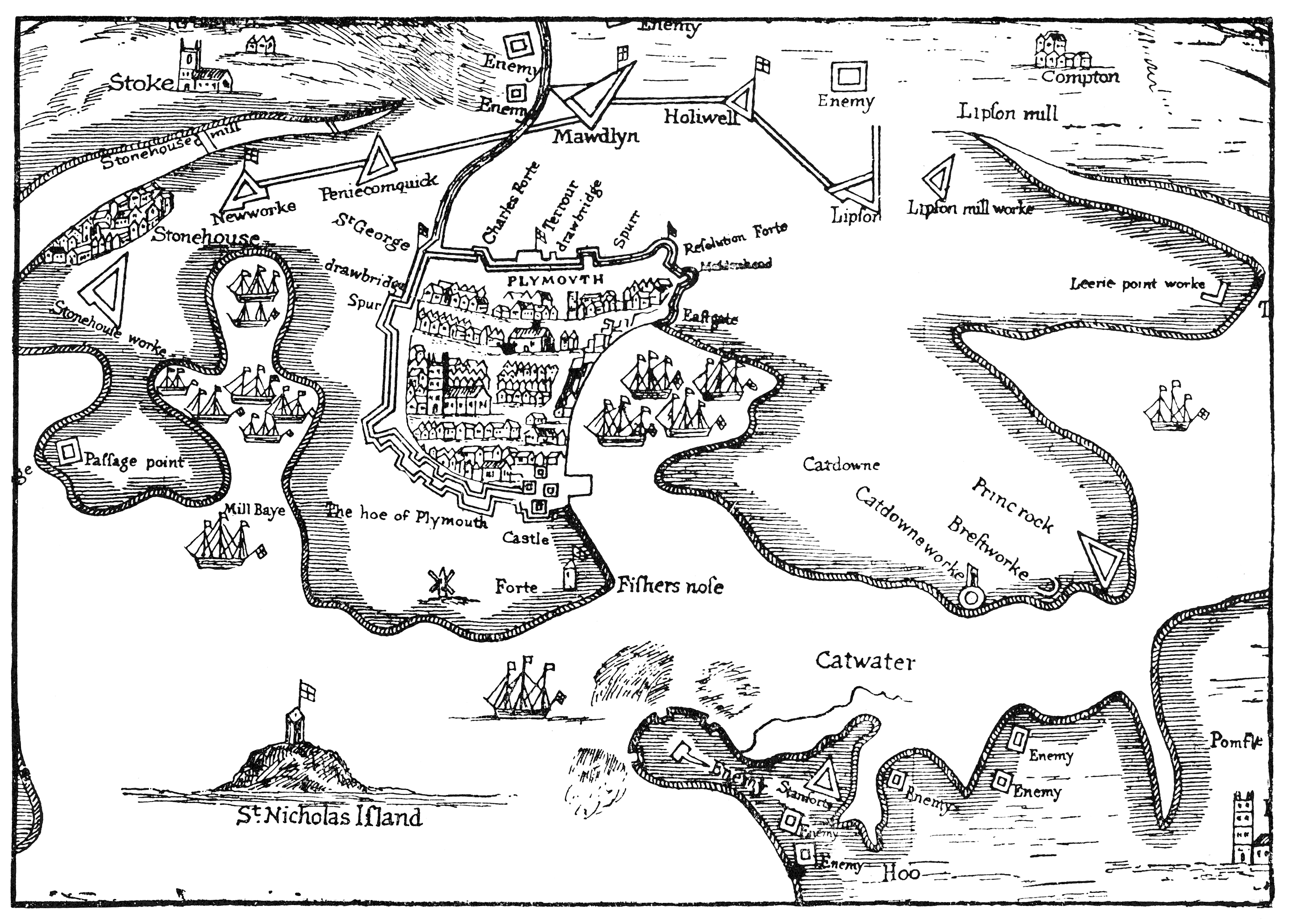
Siege of Plymouth, 1643

During the 16th century, locally produced wool was the major export commodity. Plymouth was the home port for successful maritime traders, among them Sir John Hawkins, who led England's first foray into the Atlantic slave trade, as well as Sir Francis Drake, Mayor of Plymouth in 1581–2. Crews for the first English failed settlement attempt at Roanoke Colony in North America departed in 1587 under Sir Walter Raleigh's and Drake's leadership; returning bearing maize, tobacco and potatoes.

In 1588, according to legend, Drake insisted on completing his game of bowls on the Hoe before engaging the Spanish Armada. In 1620, the Pilgrims set sail for the New World from Plymouth, establishing Plymouth Colony – the second English colony in what is now the United States (Note: The first was Jamestown in 1607.)

In 1625, the mayor estimated that African slavers captured that summer about 1,000 villagers, from the town's area, to be sold in Africa.

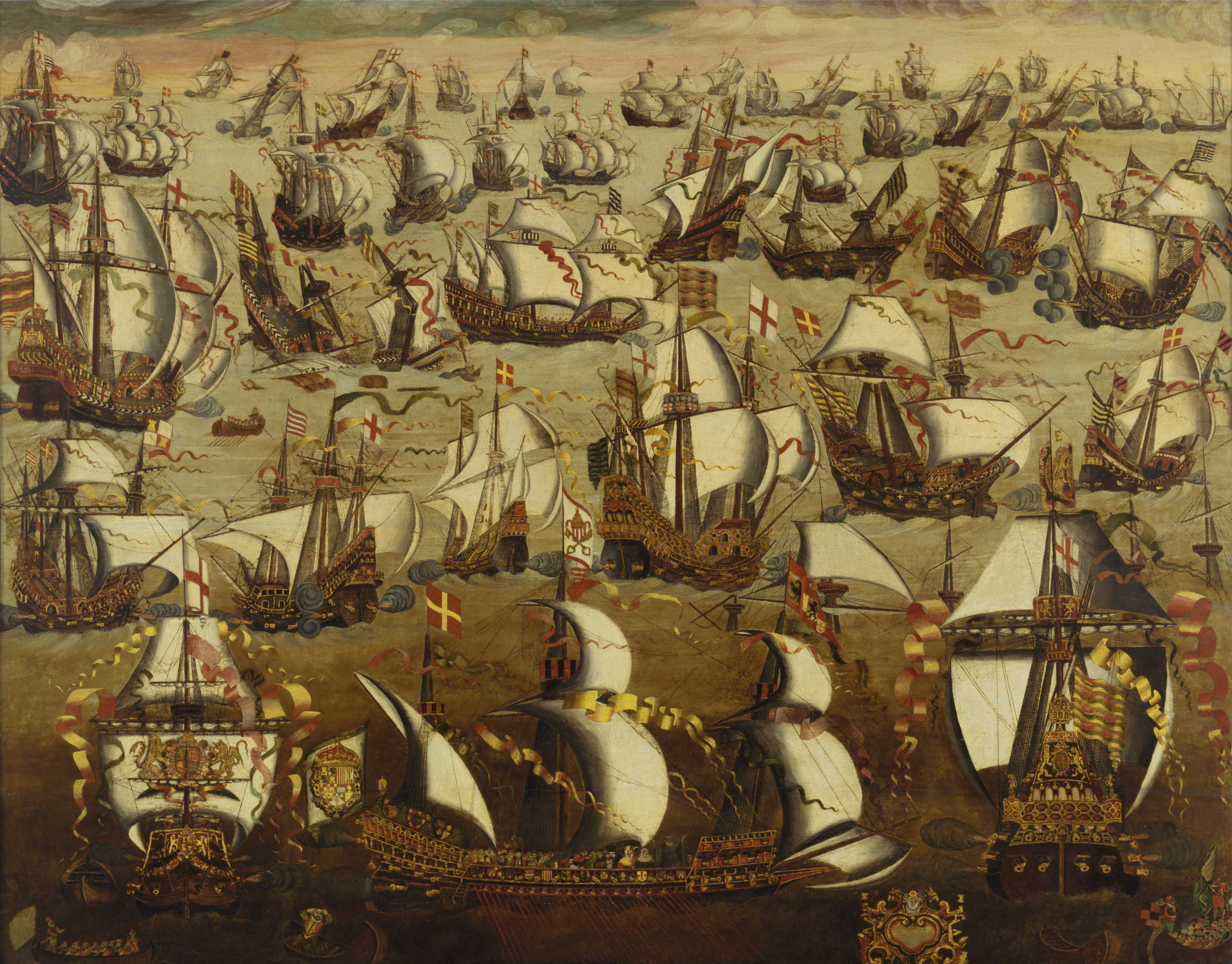
The 'invincible' Spanish Armada, 1588

During the English Civil War, Plymouth sided with the Parliamentarians and was besieged for almost four years by the Royalists. The last major attack by the Royalists was by Sir Richard Grenville leading thousands of soldiers towards Plymouth, but they were defeated by the Plymothians at Freedom Fields Park. The civil war ended as a Parliamentary win, but monarchy was restored by King Charles II in 1660, who imprisoned many of the Parliamentary heroes on Drake's Island. Construction of the Royal Citadel began in 1665, after the Restoration; it was armed with cannon facing both out to sea and into the town, rumoured to be a reminder to residents not to oppose the Crown. Mount Batten tower also dates from around this time.

=== Plymouth Dock, naval power and Foulston ===
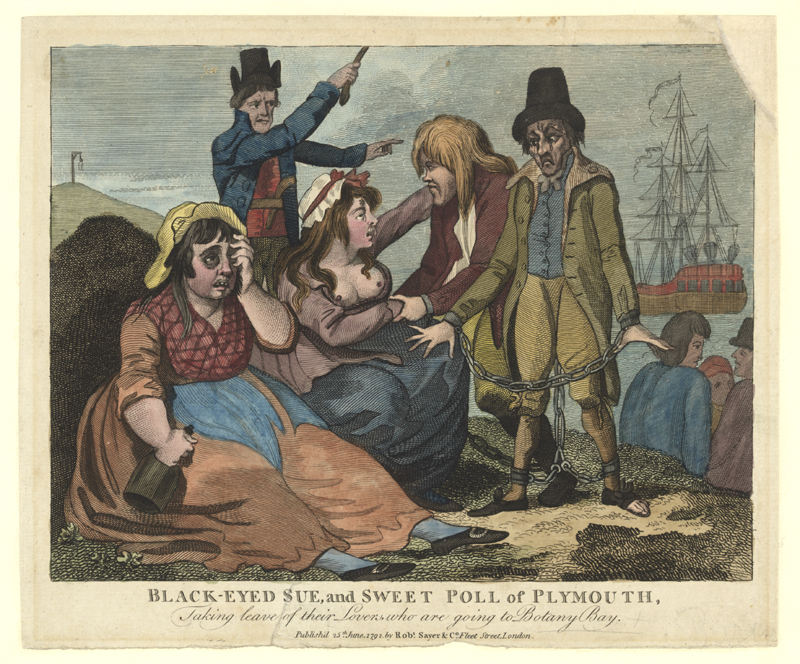
Black-eyed Sue and Sweet Poll of Plymouth mourning their lovers, who are soon to be transported to Botany Bay, 1792

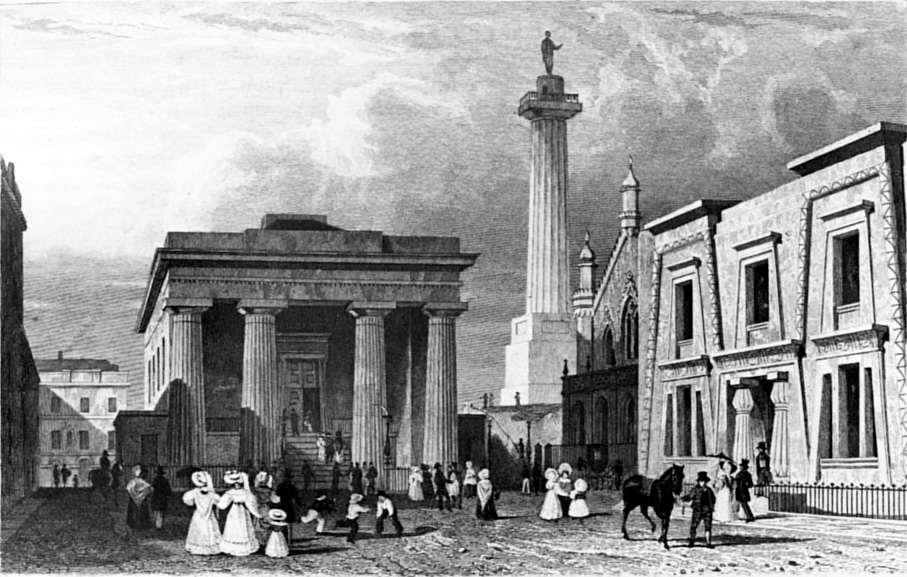
John Foulston's Town Hall, Column and Library in Devonport

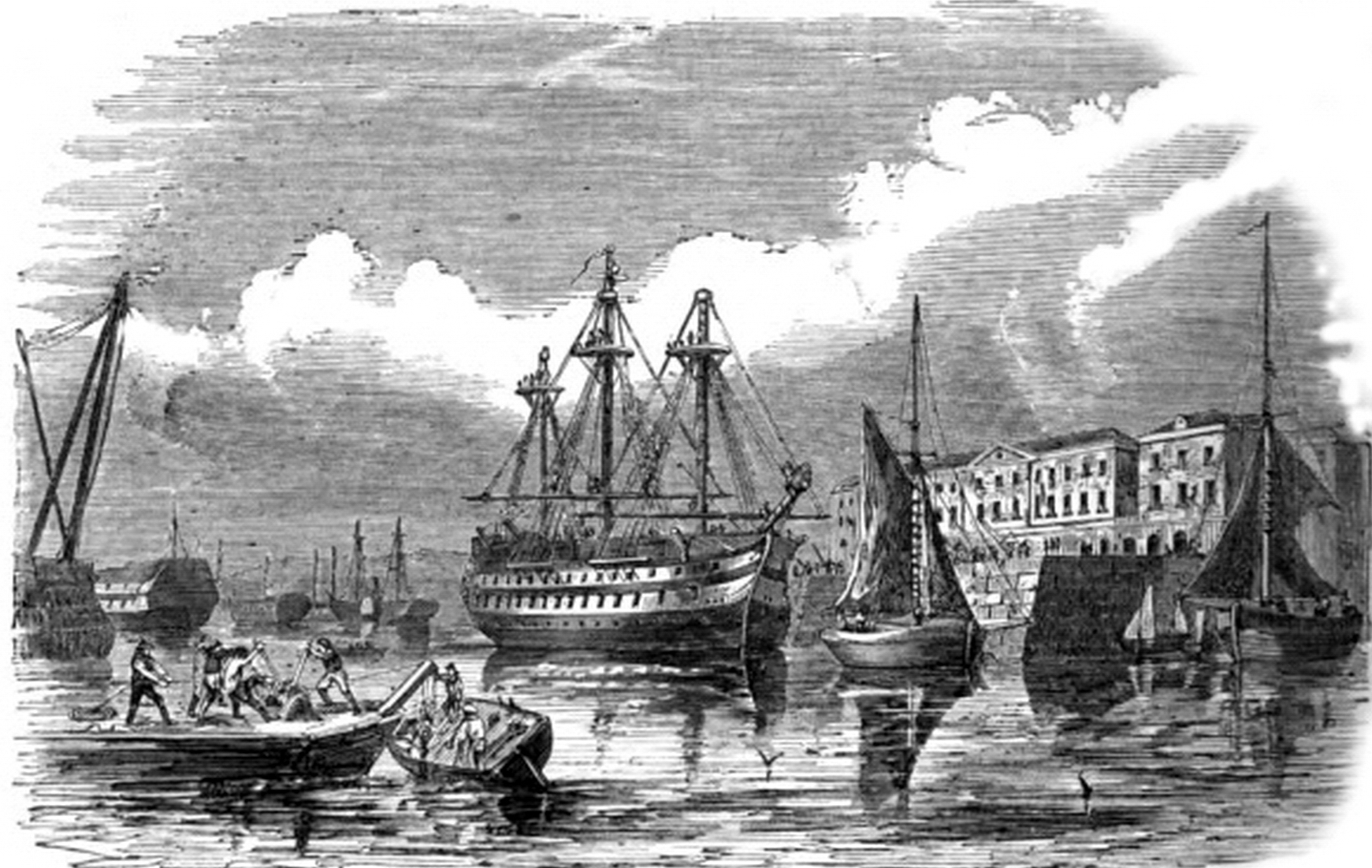
Plymouth harbour, around 1860

Throughout the 17th century, Plymouth had gradually lost its pre-eminence as a trading port. By the middle of the century, commodities manufactured elsewhere in England cost too much to transport to Plymouth and the city had no means of processing sugar or tobacco imports, major products from the colonies. Local sailors turning to piracy such as Henry Every became infamous, celebrated in the London play The Successful Pyrate. It played a part in the Atlantic slave trade during the early 18th century, although it was relatively small.

In the nearby parish of Stoke Damerel the first dockyard, HMNB Devonport, opened in 1690 on the eastern bank of the river Tamar. Further docks were built here in 1727, 1762 and 1793. The settlement that developed here was called "Dock" or "Plymouth Dock" at the time, and a new town, separate from Plymouth, grew up. In 1712, there were 318 men employed and, by 1733, the population had grown to 3,000 people.

Before the latter half of the 18th century, grain, timber and then coal were Plymouth's main imports. During this time. the real source of wealth was from the neighbouring town of Plymouth Dock (renamed in 1824 to Devonport) and the major employer in the entire region was the dockyard. The Three Towns conurbation of Plymouth, Stonehouse and Devonport enjoyed some prosperity during the late-18th and early-19th century and were enriched by a series of neo-classical urban developments designed by London architect John Foulston. Foulston was important for both Devonport and Plymouth and was responsible for several grand public buildings, many now destroyed, including the Athenaeum, the Theatre Royal and Royal Hotel, and much of Union Street.

Local chemist William Cookworthy established his short-lived Plymouth Porcelain venture in 1768 to exploit the deposits of china clay that he had discovered in Cornwall. He was acquainted with engineer John Smeaton, the builder of the third Eddystone Lighthouse.

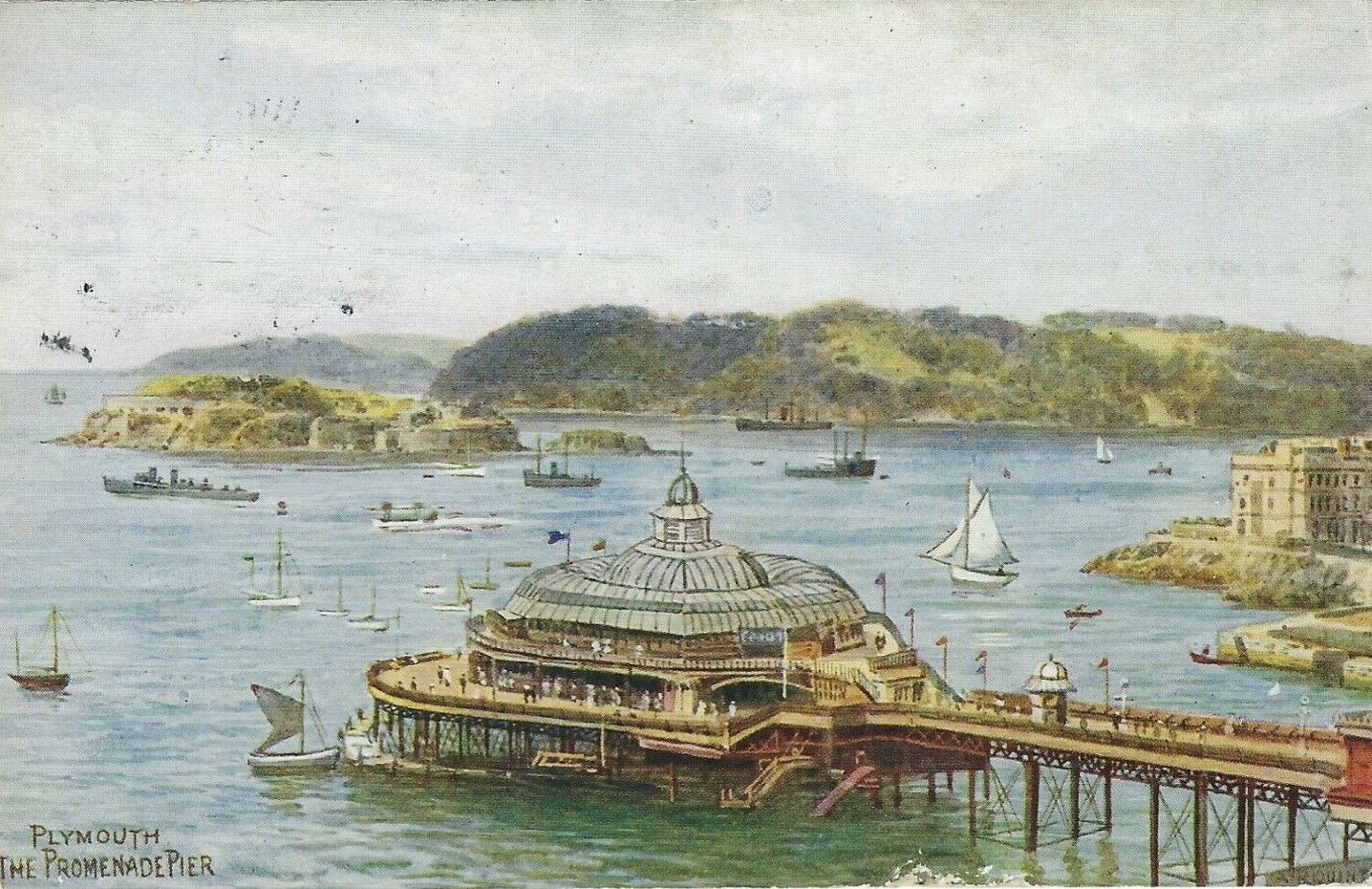
Plymouth the Promenade Pier (postcard c. 1925) by A.R. Quinton

The 1-mile-long (1.6 km) Breakwater in Plymouth Sound was designed by John Rennie to protect the fleet moving in and out of Devonport; work started in 1812. Numerous technical difficulties and repeated storm damage meant that it was not completed until 1841, twenty years after Rennie's death. In the 1860s, a ring of Palmerston forts was constructed around the outskirts of Devonport, to protect the dockyard from attack from any direction.

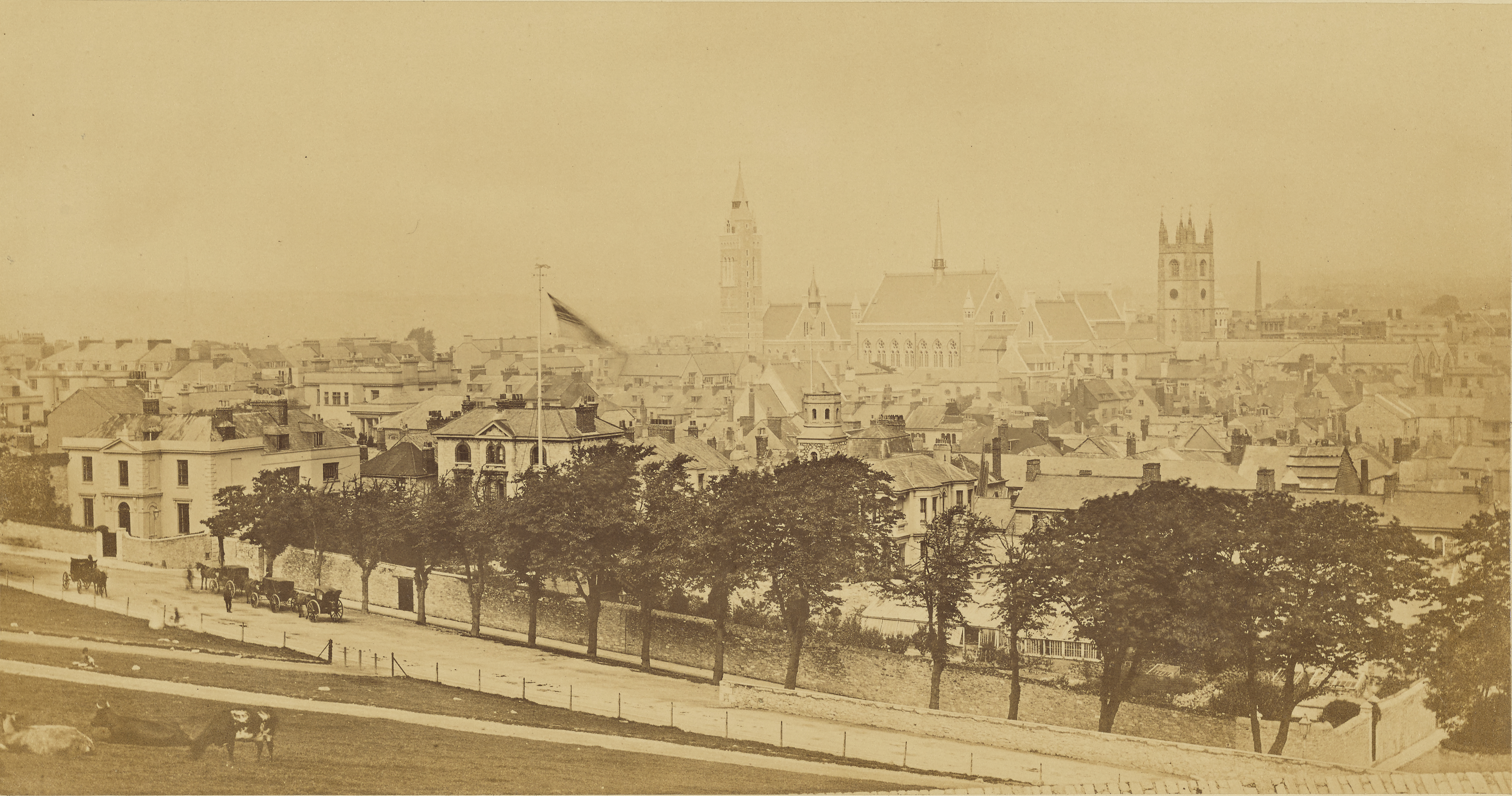
Plymouth (1860s–1880s) by Francis Frith

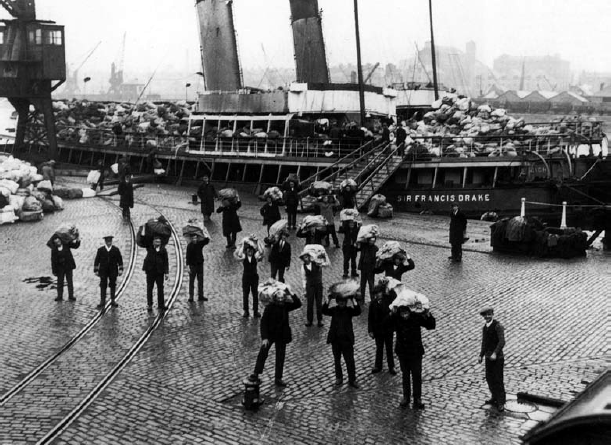
Unloading mail by hand from the Sir Francis Drake at Millbay Docks, March 1926

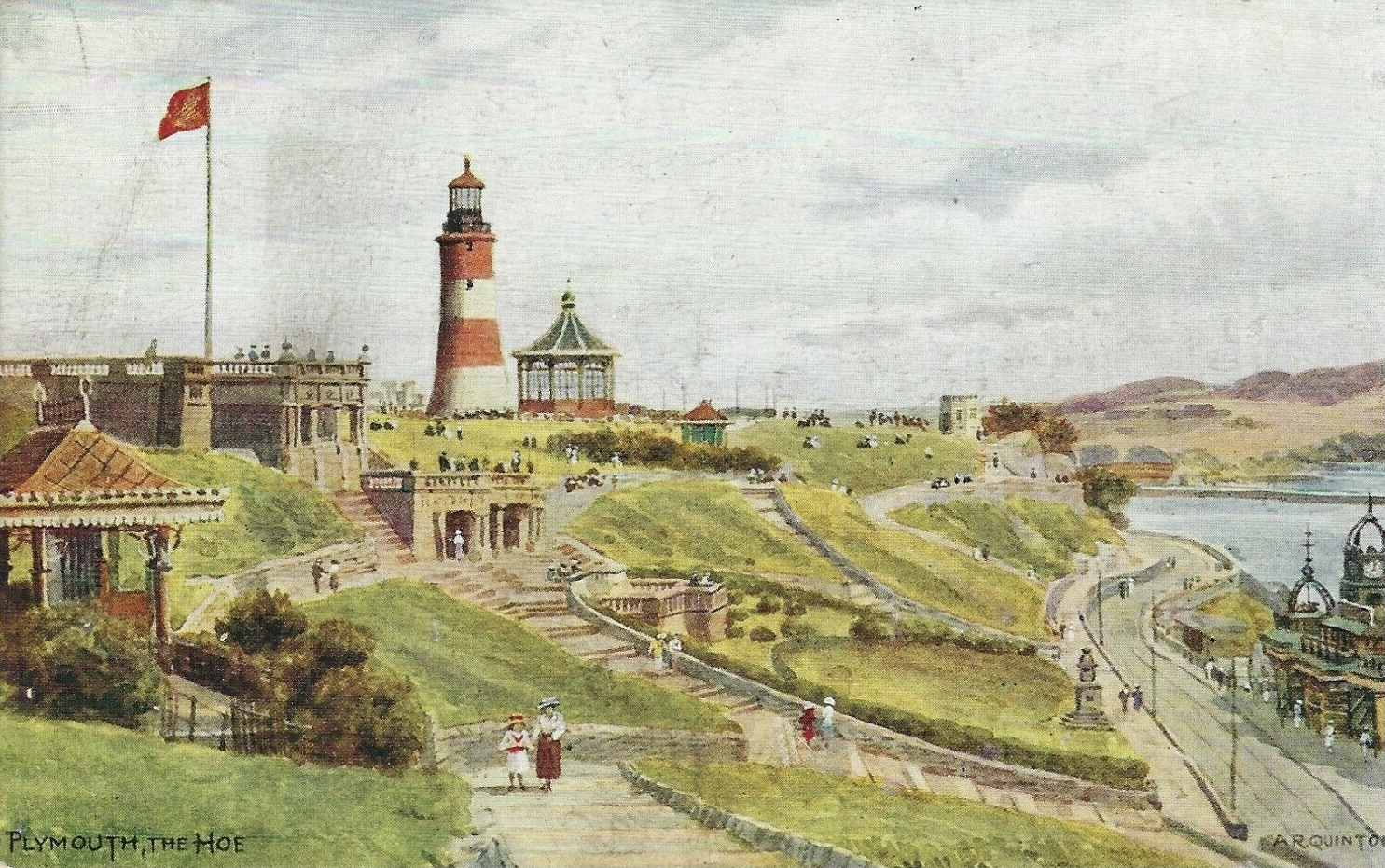
Plymouth the Hoe (postcard c.1920) by A.R. Quinton

Some of the most significant imports to Plymouth from the Americas and Europe during the latter half of the 19th century included maize, wheat, barley, sugar cane, guano, sodium nitrate and phosphate. Aside from the dockyard in the town of Devonport, industries in Plymouth such as the gasworks, the railways and tramways, and a number of small chemical works had begun to develop in the 19th century, continuing into the 20th century.

=== Plan for Plymouth (1943) ===
During the First World War, Plymouth was the port of entry for many troops from around the Empire. It was developed as a facility for the manufacture of munitions. Although major units of the Royal Navy moved to the safety of Scapa Flow, Devonport was an important base for escort vessels and repairs. Flying boats operated from Mount Batten.

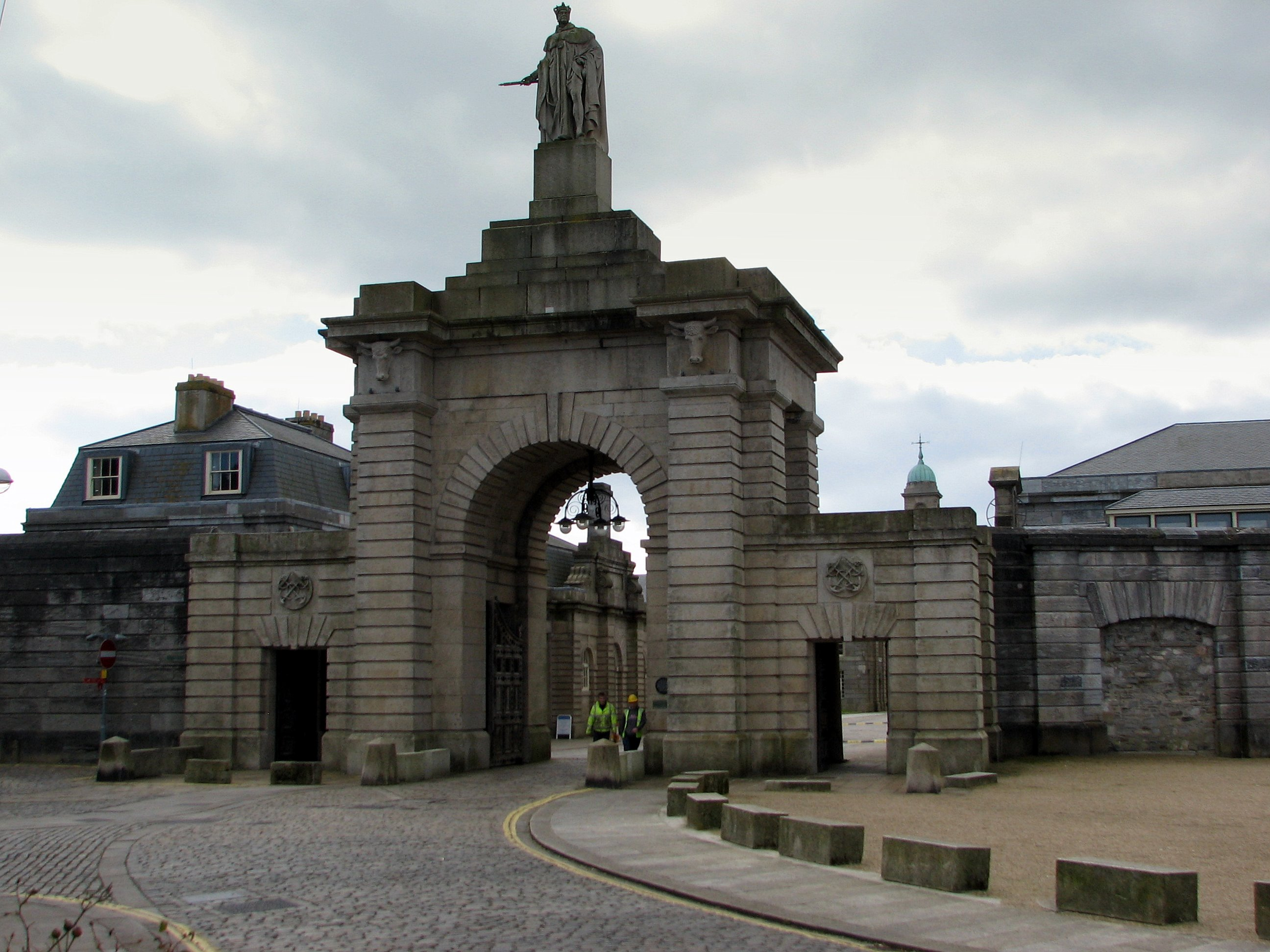
Royal William Victualling Yard, Stonehouse by Sir John Rennie, 1825–1833

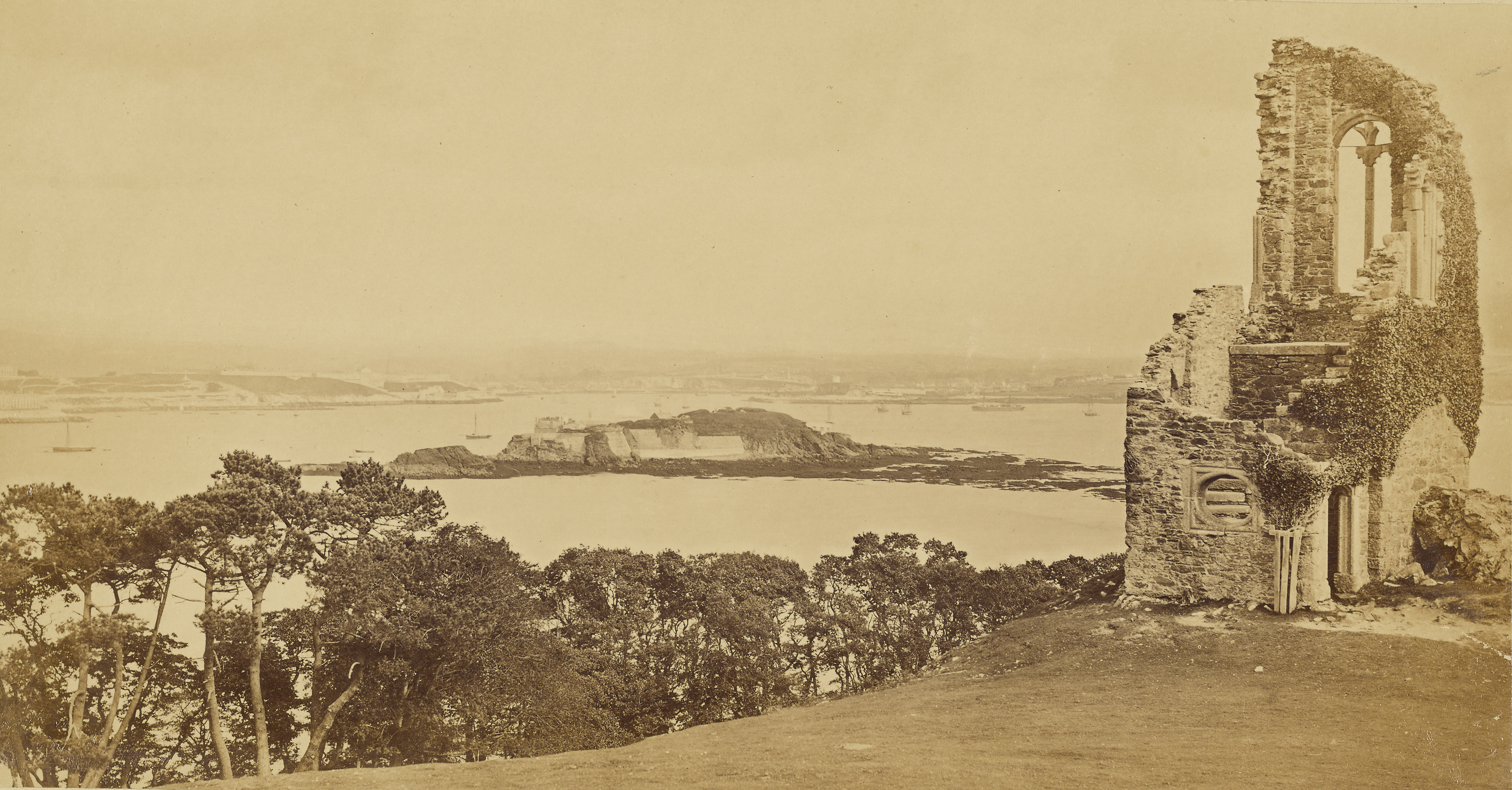
Plymouth Drake's Island (1860s–1880s) by Francis Frith

During the Second World War, Devonport was the headquarters of Western Approaches Command until 1941, and Sunderland flying boats were operated by the Royal Australian Air Force. It was an important embarkation point for US troops for D-Day. The city was heavily bombed by the Luftwaffe, in a series of 59 raids known as the Plymouth Blitz. Although the dockyards were the principal targets, much of the city centre and over 3,700 houses were completely destroyed and more than 1,000 civilians lost their lives; this was largely due to Plymouth's status as a major port. Charles Church was hit by incendiary bombs and was partially destroyed in 1941 during the Blitz, but has not been demolished. It has been designated as an official permanent monument to the bombing of Plymouth during World War II.

The redevelopment of the city was planned by Sir Patrick Abercrombie in his 1943 Plan for Plymouth, whilst simultaneously working on the reconstruction plan for London. This initially included plans to expand the city into south-east Cornwall, but these were abandoned after opposition from Cornwall County Council. Between 1951 and 1957, over 1000 homes were completed every year, mostly using innovative prefabricated systems of just three main types.

The Plan for Plymouth was, on the one hand, a template for the rapid reassembly of a destroyed city centre, but Abercrombie also took the opportunity to lay out a whole hierarchy of settlements across the city of communities, neighbourhoods and districts. Central to this was a revision of transport infrastructure that prioritised the position of the railway as a gateway to the city centre and provided in the long-term for a dual carriageway road by-pass that only finally came into being in the 1980s (forty years after being planned). The plan is the subject of Jill Craigie's documentary The Way We Live (1946).

By 1964, over 20,000 new homes had been built, transforming the dense overcrowded and unsanitary slums of the pre-war city into a low density, dispersed suburbia. Most of the city centre shops had been destroyed and those that remained were cleared to enable a zoned reconstruction according to his plan. In 1962, the modernist high rise of the Civic Centre was constructed, an architecturally significant example of mid-20th century civic slab-and-tower set piece. Plymouth City Council allowed it to fall into disrepair, but it was grade II listed in 2007 by English Heritage to prevent its demolition.

Post-war, Devonport Dockyard was kept busy refitting aircraft carriers such as the Ark Royal and, later, nuclear submarines. New light industrial factories were constructed in the newly zoned industrial sector, attracting rapid growth of the urban population. The army had substantially left the city by 1971, after barracks were pulled down in the 1960s, but the city remains home to 29 Commando Regiment Royal Artillery and also 42 Commando of the Royal Marines.

== Governance ==
As a unitary authority, there is only one tier of local government covering the city. Plymouth City Council meets at the Council House on Armada Way There are no civil parishes in the city, which is an unparished area. The city forms part of the ceremonial county of Devon for the purposes of lieutenancy, but has been administratively independent from Devon County Council since it became a unitary authority in 1998.

=== Administrative history ===
The first record of the existence of a settlement at Plymouth was in the Domesday Book in 1086 as Sudtone (Sutton), Saxon for south farm, located at the present-day Barbican. From Saxon times, it was in the hundred of Roborough. Sutton became a market town in 1254 and a borough in 1439, when it was formally renamed Plymouth.

Plymouth was reformed to become a municipal borough in 1836, governed by a corporate body officially called the "mayor, aldermen and burgesses of the borough of Plymouth", but generally known as the corporation or town council. (Note: See Municipal Corporations Act 1835 article.) When elected county councils were established in 1889, both Plymouth and neighbouring Devonport were considered large enough to provide their own county-level services and so they were made county boroughs, independent from Devon County Council. In 1914, the county boroughs of Plymouth and Devonport and the adjoining urban district of East Stonehouse were merged to form a single county borough of Plymouth. Collectively they were referred to as "The Three Towns".

Plymouth was granted city status on 18 October 1928. Between 1439 and 1935, Plymouth had a mayor after when the city was given the right to appoint a Lord Mayor. The city's boundaries further expanded in 1967 to include the town of Plympton and the parish of Plymstock.

The 1971 Local Government White Paper proposed abolishing county boroughs, which would have left Plymouth, a town of 250,000 people, being administered from a council based at the smaller Exeter, on the other side of the county. This led to Plymouth lobbying for the creation of a Tamarside county, to include Plymouth, Torpoint, Saltash and the rural hinterland. The campaign was not successful and Plymouth ceased to be a county borough on 1 April 1974, with responsibility for education, social services, highways and libraries transferred to Devon County Council. All powers returned when the city became a unitary authority on 1 April 1998, under recommendations of the Banham Commission.

In July 2026, as part of the nationwide Local Government Reorganisation programme, it was announced that the Plymouth unitary authority area would be significantly expanded to become Greater Plymouth, incorporating thirteen neighbouring parishes from South Hams, specifically Bickleigh, Brixton, Cornwood, Ermington, Harford, Holbeton, Ivybridge, Newton and Noss, Shaugh Prior, Sparkwell, Ugborough, Wembury and Yealmpton. The changes are planned to come into full effect in 2028.

=== Constituencies ===
In the Parliament of the United Kingdom, Plymouth is represented by the three constituencies of Plymouth Moor View, Plymouth Sutton and Devonport and South West Devon. Prior to Brexit in 2020 it was represented within the European Parliament as South West England.

In 1919, Nancy Astor was elected the first-ever female MP to take office in the British Houses of Parliament for the constituency of Plymouth Sutton. She was elected to the seat vacated by her husband Waldorf Astor, on his elevation to the peerage. Lady Astor was a vibrantly active campaigner for her resident constituents.

In 1945, Plymouth-born Michael Foot was elected Labour MP for the constituency of Plymouth Devonport which had been heavily damaged in the Plymouth Blitz. He represented the seat until 1955. After serving as Secretary of State for Education and being responsible for the Health and Safety at Work etc. Act 1974, he went on to become the leader of the Labour Party between 1980 and 1983.

=== City council ===
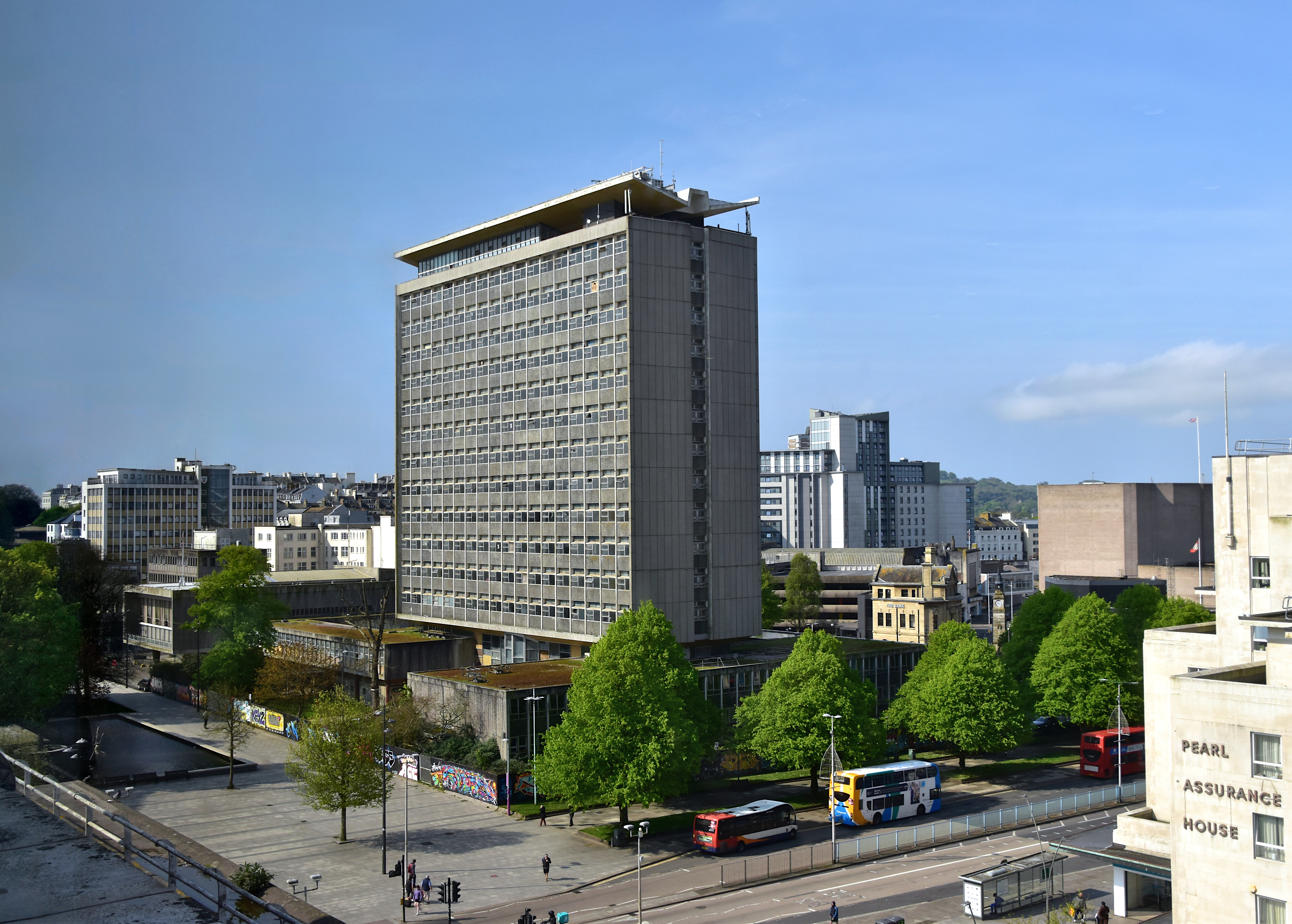
Civic Centre, completed 1962, symbolic of the post-war 'Heroic Modernism' of the welfare state; a listed building since 2007

The City of Plymouth is divided into 20 wards, 17 of which elect three councillors and the other three electing two councillors, making up a total council of 57. Elections are held three years out of every four, with a third of the council being elected each time for a four-year term. The total electorate for Plymouth's Parliamentary constituencies was 190,006 in April 2019. Since May 2023 Plymouth has had a Labour majority council.

Plymouth was granted the dignity of Lord Mayor by King George V in 1935. The position is elected each year by a group of six councillors. It is traditional that the position of the Lord Mayor alternates between the Conservative and the Labour parties annually and that the Lord Mayor chooses their deputy.

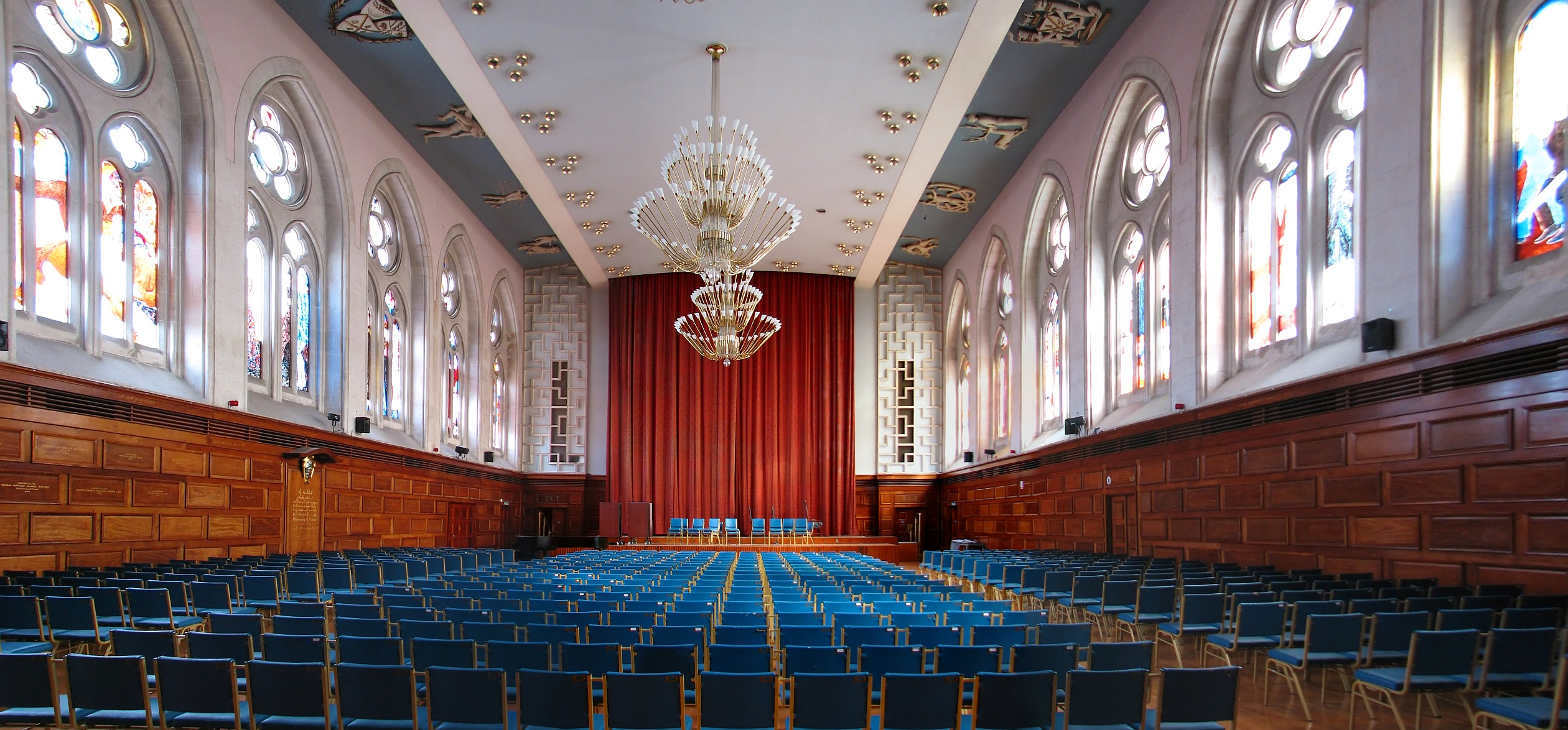
The Great Hall in the Guildhall

The Lord Mayor's official residence is 3 Elliot Terrace, located on the Hoe. Once a home of Waldorf and Nancy Astor, it was given by Lady Astor to the City of Plymouth as an official residence for future Lord Mayors and is also used today for civic hospitality, as lodgings for visiting dignitaries and High Court judges and it is also available to hire for private events. The Civic Centre municipal office building in Armada Way became a listed building in June 2007 because of its quality and period features, but has become the centre of a controversy as the council planned for its demolition estimating that it could cost £40m to refurbish it, resulting in possible job losses.

== Geography ==
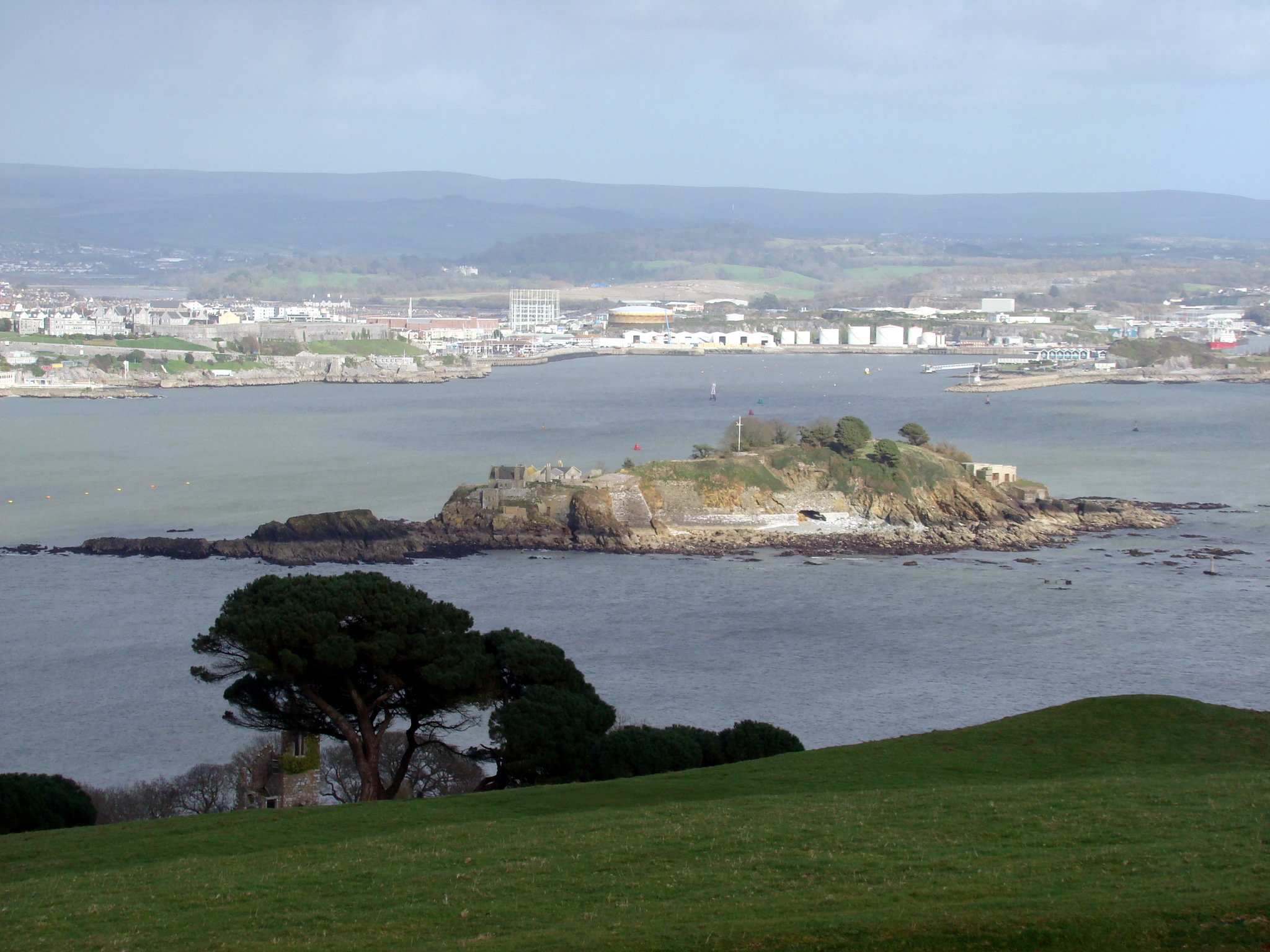
North-eastward view of Plymouth Sound from Mount Edgcumbe Country Park in Cornwall, with Drake's Island (centre) and, behind it from left to right, the Royal Citadel, the fuel tanks of Cattedown and Mount Batten; in the background are the hills of Dartmoor

Plymouth lies between the Plym to the east and the Tamar to the west; both rivers flow into the natural harbour of Plymouth Sound. Since 1967, the unitary authority of Plymouth has included the, once independent, towns of Plympton and Plymstock which lie along the east of the Plym. The Tamar forms the county boundary between Devon and Cornwall; its estuary forms the Hamoaze on which is sited Devonport Dockyard.

The Plym, which flows off Dartmoor to the north-east, forms a smaller estuary to the east of the city called Cattewater. Plymouth Sound is protected from the sea by the Plymouth Breakwater, in use since 1814. In the Sound is Drake's Island, which is seen from Plymouth Hoe; it is a flat public area on top of limestone cliffs. The Unitary Authority of Plymouth is 80 km^{2} (31 mi^{2}). The topography rises from sea level to a height, at Roborough, of about 509 feet (155 m) above Ordnance Datum (AOD).

Geologically, Plymouth has a mixture of limestone, Devonian slate, granite and Middle Devonian limestone. Plymouth Sound, Shores and Cliffs is a Site of Special Scientific Interest, because of its geology. The bulk of the city is built upon Upper Devonian slates and shales and the headlands at the entrance to Plymouth Sound are formed of Lower Devonian slates, which can withstand the power of the sea.

A band of Middle Devonian limestone runs west to east from Cremyll to Plymstock including the Hoe. Local limestone may be seen in numerous buildings, walls and pavements throughout Plymouth. To the north and northeast of the city is the granite mass of Dartmoor; the granite was mined and exported via Plymouth. Rocks brought down the Tamar from Dartmoor include ores containing tin, copper, tungsten, lead and other minerals. There is evidence that the middle Devonian limestone belt at the south edge of Plymouth and in Plymstock was quarried at West Hoe, Cattedown and Radford.

=== Urban form ===
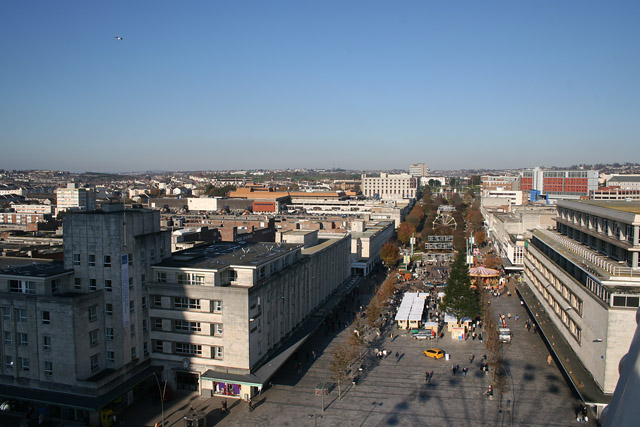
Armada Way, looking north

On 27 April 1944, Sir Patrick Abercrombie's Plan for Plymouth to rebuild the bomb-damaged city was published; it called for demolition of the few remaining pre-war buildings in the city centre to make way for their replacement with wide, parallel and modern boulevards aligned east–west linked by a north–south avenue (Armada Way) linking the railway station with the vista of Plymouth Hoe.

A peripheral road system connecting the historic Barbican on the east and Union Street to the west determines the principal form of the city centre, even following pedestrianisation of the shopping centre in the late 1980s. It continues to inform the present Vision for Plymouth, developed by a team led by Barcelona-based architect David MacKay in 2003, which calls for revivification of the city centre with mixed-use and residential.

In suburban areas, post-War prefabs had already begun to appear by 1946 and over 1,000 permanent council houses were built each year from 1951 to 1957, according to the Modernist zoned low-density garden city model advocated by Abercrombie. By 1964 over 20,000 new homes had been built, more than 13,500 of them permanent council homes and 853 built by the Admiralty.

Plymouth is home to 28 parks with an average size of 45,638 m^{2} (491,240 sq ft). Its largest is Central Park, with other sizeable green spaces including Victoria Park, Freedom Fields Park, Alexandra Park, Devonport Park and the Hoe. Plymouth Argyle Football Club are based at Home Park.

The Plymouth Plan 2019–2034 was published May 2019 and sets the direction for future development with a new spatial strategy which reinforces links with the wider region in west Devon and east Cornwall in its Joint Local Plan and identifies three development areas within the city:

- the city centre and waterfront
- a 'northern corridor', including Derriford and the vacant airfield site at Roborough
- an 'eastern corridor', including major new settlements at Sherford and Langage. Plymouth is categorised as a Small-Port City using the Southampton System for classification.

=== Climate ===
Plymouth has a moderated temperate oceanic climate (Köppen Cfb) which is wetter and milder than the rest of England. This means a wide range of exotic plants, palm trees and yuccas can be cultivated. The annual mean high temperature is approximately 14 °C (57 °F). Due to the moderating effect of the sea and the south-westerly location, the climate is among the mildest of British cities and one of the warmest UK cities in winter.

The coldest month of February is similarly moderate, having mild mean minimum temperatures between 3 and 4 °C (37 and 39 °F). Snow usually falls in small amounts but a noteworthy recent exception was the period of the European winter storms of 2009–10 which, in early January 2010, covered Plymouth in at least 2.5 cm (1 in) of snow; more on higher ground. Another notable event was the 20 cm (8 in) of snowfall between 17 and 19 December 2010 – though only 5.1 cm (2 in) would lie at any one time due to melting. Over the 1961–1990 period, annual snowfall accumulation averaged less than 7 cm (3 in) per year.

South West England has a favoured location when the Azores High pressure area extends north-eastwards towards the UK, particularly in summer. Coastal areas have average annual sunshine totals over 1,600 hours.

Owing to its geographic location, rainfall tends to be associated with Atlantic depressions or with convection and is more frequent and heavier than in London and south-east England. The Atlantic depressions are more vigorous in autumn and winter and most of the rain which falls in those seasons in the south-west is from this source. Average annual rainfall is around 980 millimetres (39 in). November to March have the highest mean wind speeds, with June to August having the lightest winds. The predominant wind direction is from the south-west.

Typically, the warmest day of the year (1991–2020) will achieve a temperature of 27.0 °C (81 °F), although in July 2022 the temperature reached 33.9 °C (93.0 °F), the site record. On average, 9.8 days of the year will report a maximum temperature of 25 °C (77 °F) or above. During the winter half of the year, the coldest night will typically fall to −3.1 °C (26 °F); however, in January 1979, the temperature fell to −8.8 °C (16 °F). Typically, an average of 13 nights of the year will register an air frost.

Climate data for Plymouth (Mount Batten) (Note: Weather station is located 1.6 miles (2.6 km) from the Plymouth city centre.) WMO ID: 03827; coordinates 50°21′18″N 4°07′16″W; elevation: 50 m (164 ft), 1991–2020 normals, extremes 1930–present
Month	Jan	Feb	Mar	Apr	May	Jun	Jul	Aug	Sep	Oct	Nov	Dec	Year
Record high °C (°F)	13.8 (56.8)	17.3 (63.1)	20.1 (68.2)	24.1 (75.4)	29.8 (85.6)	31.6 (88.9)	33.9 (93.0)	33.2 (91.8)	27.7 (81.9)	24.7 (76.5)	19.2 (66.6)	16.1 (61.0)	33.9 (93.0)
Mean daily maximum °C (°F)	9.0 (48.2)	9.2 (48.6)	10.9 (51.6)	13.2 (55.8)	15.9 (60.6)	18.4 (65.1)	20.2 (68.4)	20.3 (68.5)	18.5 (65.3)	15.1 (59.2)	11.9 (53.4)	9.7 (49.5)	14.4 (57.9)
Daily mean °C (°F)	6.6 (43.9)	6.6 (43.9)	7.9 (46.2)	9.8 (49.6)	12.4 (54.3)	14.9 (58.8)	16.8 (62.2)	16.9 (62.4)	15.1 (59.2)	12.3 (54.1)	9.3 (48.7)	7.3 (45.1)	11.3 (52.3)
Mean daily minimum °C (°F)	4.2 (39.6)	3.9 (39.0)	4.9 (40.8)	6.3 (43.3)	8.8 (47.8)	11.4 (52.5)	13.2 (55.8)	13.4 (56.1)	11.7 (53.1)	9.5 (49.1)	6.7 (44.1)	4.8 (40.6)	8.2 (46.8)
Record low °C (°F)	−8.8 (16.2)	−7.0 (19.4)	−7.0 (19.4)	−2.4 (27.7)	−0.6 (30.9)	1.7 (35.1)	6.1 (43.0)	3.9 (39.0)	1.9 (35.4)	−1.7 (28.9)	−4.4 (24.1)	−5.9 (21.4)	−8.8 (16.2)
Average precipitation mm (inches)	109.6 (4.31)	87.7 (3.45)	76.2 (3.00)	68.5 (2.70)	60.1 (2.37)	64.4 (2.54)	63.5 (2.50)	80.3 (3.16)	72.3 (2.85)	112.1 (4.41)	117.8 (4.64)	125.2 (4.93)	1,037.7 (40.85)
Average precipitation days (≥ 1.0 mm)	15.4	12.7	12.3	11.0	9.8	9.7	10.0	11.3	10.1	14.8	15.9	15.7	148.6
Mean monthly sunshine hours	61.8	88.0	131.0	189.3	227.4	220.8	209.7	197.5	161.3	118.4	72.6	54.5	1,732.3
Source 1: Met Office
Source 2: Starlings Roost Weather

=== Demography ===
Population pyramid of Plymouth (unitary authority) in 2021

From the 2011 Census, the Office for National Statistics (ONS) published that Plymouth's unitary authority area population was 256,384; 15,664 more people than that of the previous census in 2001, which indicated that Plymouth had a population of 240,720. The Plymouth urban area had a population of 260,203 in 2011, the urban sprawl which extends outside the authority's boundaries. The city's average household size was 2.3 persons.

At the time of the 2021 UK census, the ethnic composition of Plymouth's population was 94.1% White (of which 89.5% was White British), with the largest minority ethnic group being Chinese at 0.5%. The white Irish ethnic group saw the largest decline in its share of the population since the 2001 Census to 2011 (−24%), while the Other Asian and Black African had the largest increases (360% and 351% respectively). This excludes the two new ethnic groups added to the 2011 census of Gypsy or Irish Traveller and Arab. The population rose rapidly during the second half of the 19th century, but declined by over 1.6% from 1931 to 1951.

Plymouth's gross value added (Note: A measure of the size of its economy.) was £5,169 million in 2013, making up 25% of Devon's GVA. Its GVA per person was £19,943 and compared to the national average of £23,755, was £3,812 lower. Plymouth's unemployment rate was 7.0% in 2014 which was 2.0 points higher than the South West average and 0.8 points higher than the average for Great Britain.

A 2014 profile by the National Health Service showed Plymouth had higher than average levels of poverty and deprivation (26.2% of the population among the poorest 20.4% nationally). Life expectancy in Plymouth is 78.8 years for men and 82.5 for women

Ethnic Group	Year							
Ethnic Group	1991		2001		2011		2021	
Ethnic Group	Number	%	Number	%	Number	%	Number	%
White: Total	241,233	99.1%	236,767	98.4%	246,509	96.1%	248,727	94.1%
White: British	–	–	232,377	96.5%	238,263	92.9%	236,802	89.5%
White: Irish	–	–	1,359	0.6%	1,105		1,055	0.4%
White: Gypsy or Irish Traveller	–	–	–	–	153		165	0.1%
White: Roma							168	0.1%
White: Other	–	–	3,031		6,988		10,537	4.0%
Asian or Asian British: Total	971	0.4%	1,427	0.6%	3,906	1.5%	5,947	2.1%
Asian or Asian British: Indian	209		258		875		1,403	0.5%
Asian or Asian British: Pakistani	53		83		202		389	0.1%
Asian or Asian British: Bangladeshi	105		152		359		537	0.2%
Asian or Asian British: Chinese	382		685		1,251		1,430	0.5%
Asian or Asian British: Other Asian	222		249		1,219		2188	0.8%
Black or Black British: Total	621	0.3%	451	0.2%	1,678	0.7%	2,786	1.1%
Black or Black British: African	180		230		1,106		2,022	0.8%
Black or Black British: Caribbean	177		165		343		460	0.2%
Black or Black British: Other Black	264		56		229		304	0.1%
Mixed or British Mixed: Total	–	–	1,559	0.6%	3,287	1.3%	4,656	1.7%
Mixed: White and Black Caribbean	–	–	420		904		1,108	0.4%
Mixed: White and Black African	–	–	246		523		860	0.3%
Mixed: White and Asian	–	–	498		1,028		1,349	0.5%
Mixed: Other Mixed	–	–	395		832		1,339	0.5%
Other: Total	548	0.3%	516	0.6%	944	0.4%	2,579	1%
Other: Arab					339		677	0.3%
Other: Any other ethnic group	548	0.3%	516	0.6%	605		1,902	0.7%
Total	243,373	100%	240,720	100%	256,384	100%	264,695	100%

== Education ==
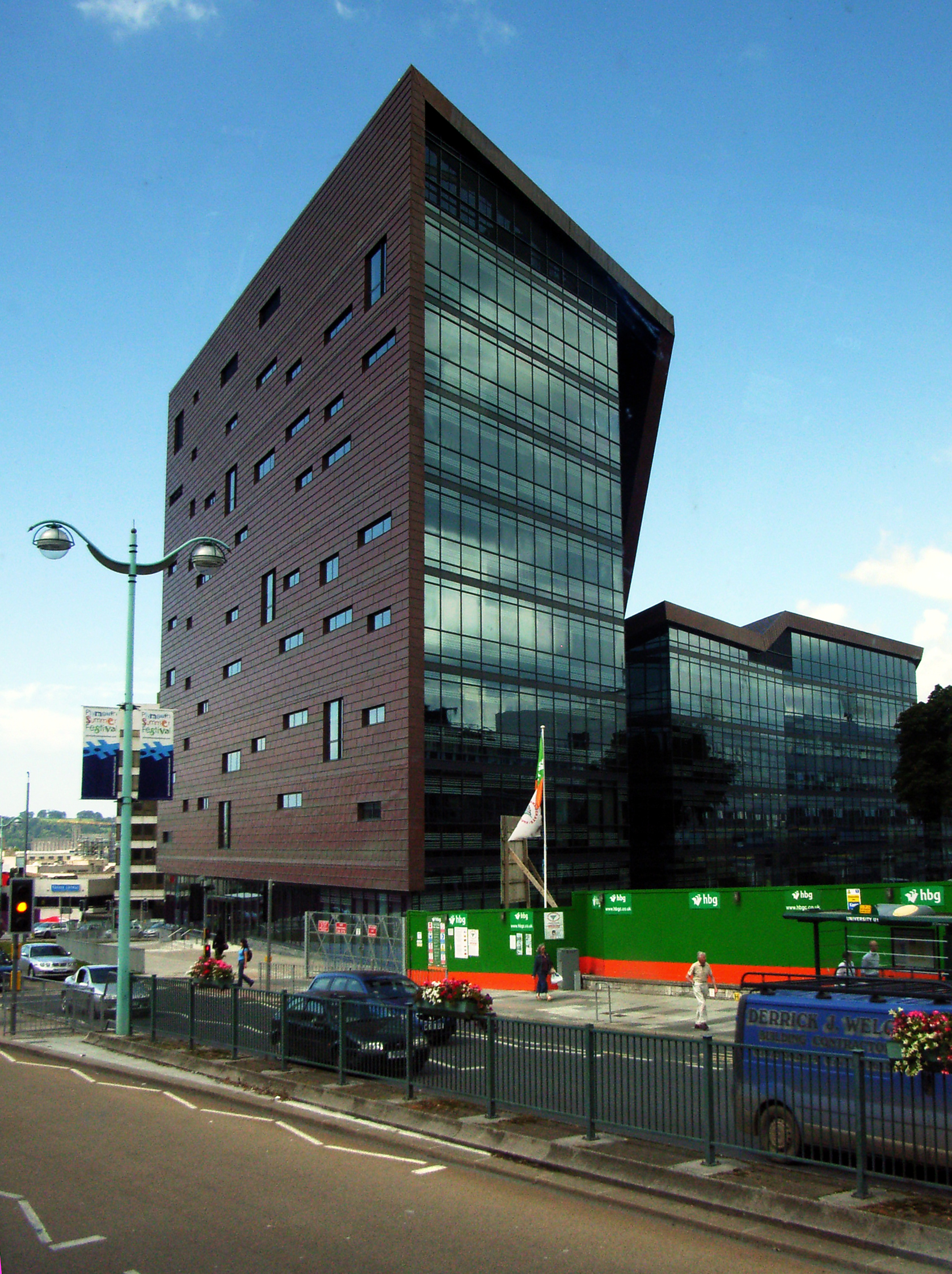
The Roland Levinsky Building, faculty of Arts of the University of Plymouth

There are three universities based in the city: the University of Plymouth, Plymouth Marjon University and the Arts University Plymouth.

The University of Plymouth enrolls 23,155 total students as of 2018/19 (57th largest in the UK out of 169). It also employs 2,900 staff with an annual income of around £160 million. It was founded in 1992 from Polytechnic South West (formerly Plymouth Polytechnic) following the Further and Higher Education Act 1992. It has a wide range of courses including those in marine focused business, marine engineering, marine biology and Earth, ocean and environmental sciences, surf science, shipping and logistics. The university formed a joint venture with the fellow Devonian University of Exeter in 2000, establishing the Peninsula College of Medicine and Dentistry. The college was ranked eighth out of 30 universities in the UK in 2011 for medicine. Its dental school was established in 2006, which also provides free dental care in an attempt to improve access to it in the South West.

The University of St Mark & St John (known as "Marjon" or "Marjons") specialises in teacher training, and offers training across the country and abroad.

Arts University Plymouth offers a selection of courses including media. It was originally founded as the Plymouth Drawing School in 1852 and, in December 2008, Plymouth College of Art and Design was renamed Plymouth College of Art. In May 2022, the college was awarded University status and assumed its current name.

The city is also home to two large colleges, including City College Plymouth which provides courses from the most basic to foundation degrees for approximately 26,000 students.

Plymouth also has 71 state primary phase schools, 13 state secondary schools, eight special schools and three selective state grammar schools, Devonport High School for Girls, Devonport High School for Boys and Plymouth High School for Girls. There is also a private all-through school, Plymouth College.

The city was also home to the Royal Naval Engineering College; opened in 1880 in Keyham, it trained engineering students for five years before they completed the remaining two years of the course at Greenwich. The college closed in 1910 but, in 1940. a new college opened at Manadon. This was renamed Dockyard Technical College in 1959 before finally closing in 1994; training was transferred to the University of Southampton.

Plymouth is home to the Marine Biological Association of the United Kingdom (MBA; founded 1884) which conducts research in all areas of the marine sciences. The Plymouth Marine Laboratory (PML; founded 1988) was formed in part from components of the MBA. Together with the National Marine Aquarium, the Sir Alister Hardy Foundation for Ocean Sciences, Plymouth University's Marine Institute and the Diving Diseases Research Centre, these marine-related organisations form the Plymouth Marine Sciences Partnership. The Plymouth Marine Laboratory, which focuses on global issues of climate change and sustainability. It monitors the effects of ocean acidity on corals and shellfish and reports the results to the UK government. It also cultivates algae that could be used to make biofuels or in the treatment of wastewater by using technology such as photo-bioreactors. It works alongside Boots to investigate the use of algae in skincare protects, taking advantage of the chemicals they contain that adapt to protect themselves from the sun.

A scheme was in operation over summer 2018 to provide meals during the summer holidays for children with parents on a low income, who could not afford to provide their children with healthy meals.

University of Plymouth Students' Union (UPSU) is based underground near the library. Every student at the university is a member of UPSU; it employs students across the university, from bar staff to events technicians. Every year, the students at the university have an opportunity to vote which sabbatical officers represent them. In 2019, over 4,000 students voted in the UPSU elections.

== Economy ==
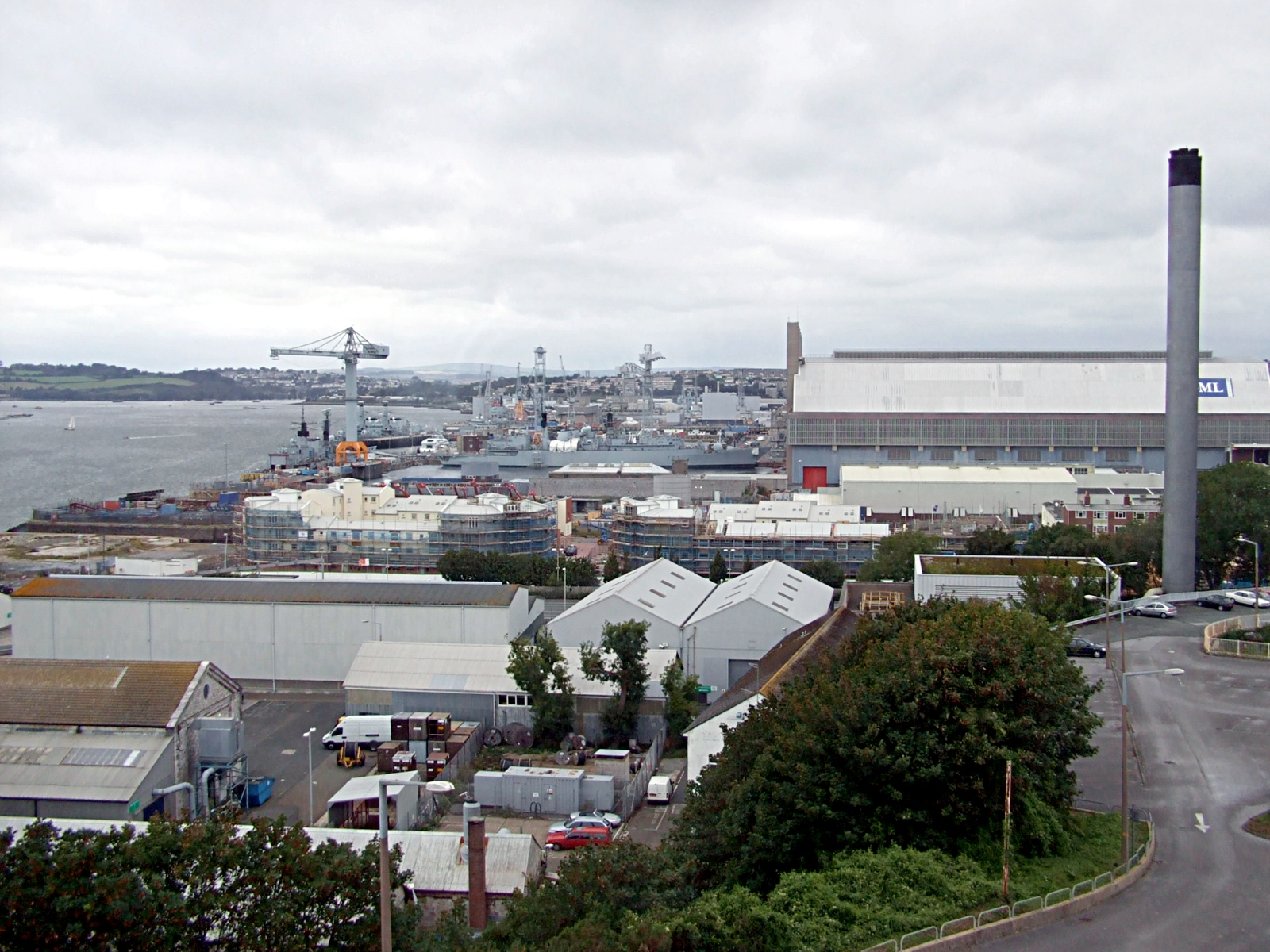
HMNB Devonport – the largest operational naval base in Western Europe.

Due to its coastal location, the economy of Plymouth has traditionally been maritime, in particular the defence sector with over 12,000 people employed and approximately 7,500 in the armed forces. The Plymouth Gin Distillery has been producing Plymouth Gin since 1793, which was exported around the world by the Royal Navy. During the 1930s, it was the most widely distributed gin and had a controlled term of origin until 2015. Since the 1980s, employment in the defence sector has decreased substantially and the public sector is now prominent particularly in administration, health, education, medicine and engineering.

Devonport Dockyard is the UK's only naval base that refits nuclear submarines and the Navy estimates that the Dockyard generates about 10% of Plymouth's income. Plymouth has the largest cluster of marine and maritime businesses in the south west with 270 firms operating within the sector. Other substantial employers include the university with almost 3,000 staff, the national retail chain The Range at their Estover headquarters, as well as the Plymouth Science Park employing 500 people in 50 companies.

Plymouth has a post-war shopping area in the city centre with substantial pedestrianisation. At the west end of the zone inside a grade II listed building is the Pannier Market that was completed in 1959; pannier means "basket" in French, so it translates as "basket market". In terms of retail floorspace, Plymouth is ranked in the top five in the South West, and 29th nationally. Plymouth was one of the first ten British cities to trial the new Business improvement district initiative.

The Tinside Pool is situated at the foot of the Hoe and became a grade II listed building in 1998 before being restored to its 1930s look for £3.4 million.

=== Plymouth 2020 ===
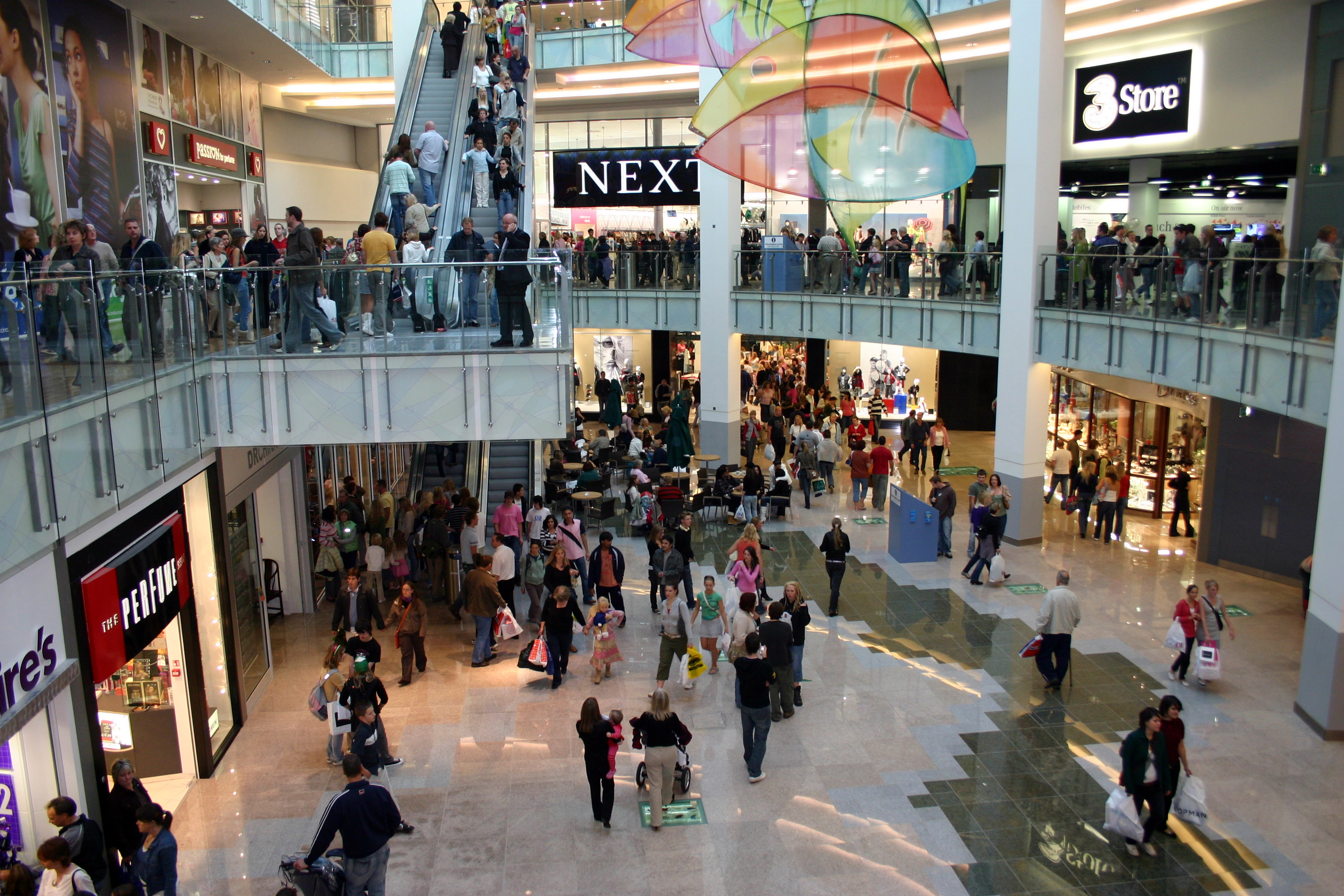
Interior of the Drake Circus shopping centre in 2006

Since 2003, Plymouth Council has been undertaking a project of urban redevelopment called the "Vision for Plymouth" launched by the architect David Mackay and backed by the council and the Plymouth Chamber of Commerce (PCC). With the aim of growing the population to 300,000 by building 33,000 new dwellings, its projects range from shopping centres, new public realm, a cruise terminal, rebalancing the underutilised city centre retail district and opening waterfront development linked by a new urban boulevard.

In 2004. the old Drake Circus Shopping Centre and Charles Cross car park were demolished and replaced by a new facility, which opened in October 2006. It received negative feedback before opening when David Mackay said it was already "ten years out of date". It was awarded the first ever Carbuncle Cup, awarded for Britain's ugliest building, in 2006. In contrast, the Theatre Royal's production and education centre, TR2, which was built on wasteland at Cattedown, was a runner-up for the RIBA Stirling Prize for Architecture in 2003.

Proposals included the demolition of the Plymouth Pavilions entertainment arena to create a canal boulevard linking Millbay to the city centre delivered in 2020. The area is being regenerated with mixed residential, retail and office space alongside the ferry port.

Plymouth's Civic Centre was vacated by the city council, and their operations were dispersed across the city centre. The vacant and dilapidated modernist building was proposed for demolition by the council, but was ultimately saved by a listing in 2007 for its national architectural merit and was gifted to the developers Urban Splash, which intends to refurbish the structure for a mixed-use regeneration including variable let accommodation. The removal and relocation of Bretonside bus station — a site originally earmarked for the council — was ultimately released for a mixed-use commercial leisure redevelopment including cinema and restaurants named Barcode owned by British Land, which also owns the adjacent Drake's Circus.

Jacka Bakery in the Barbican district is reputedly the oldest bakery in the UK and has operated since the 1600s.

== Transport ==
=== Railway ===
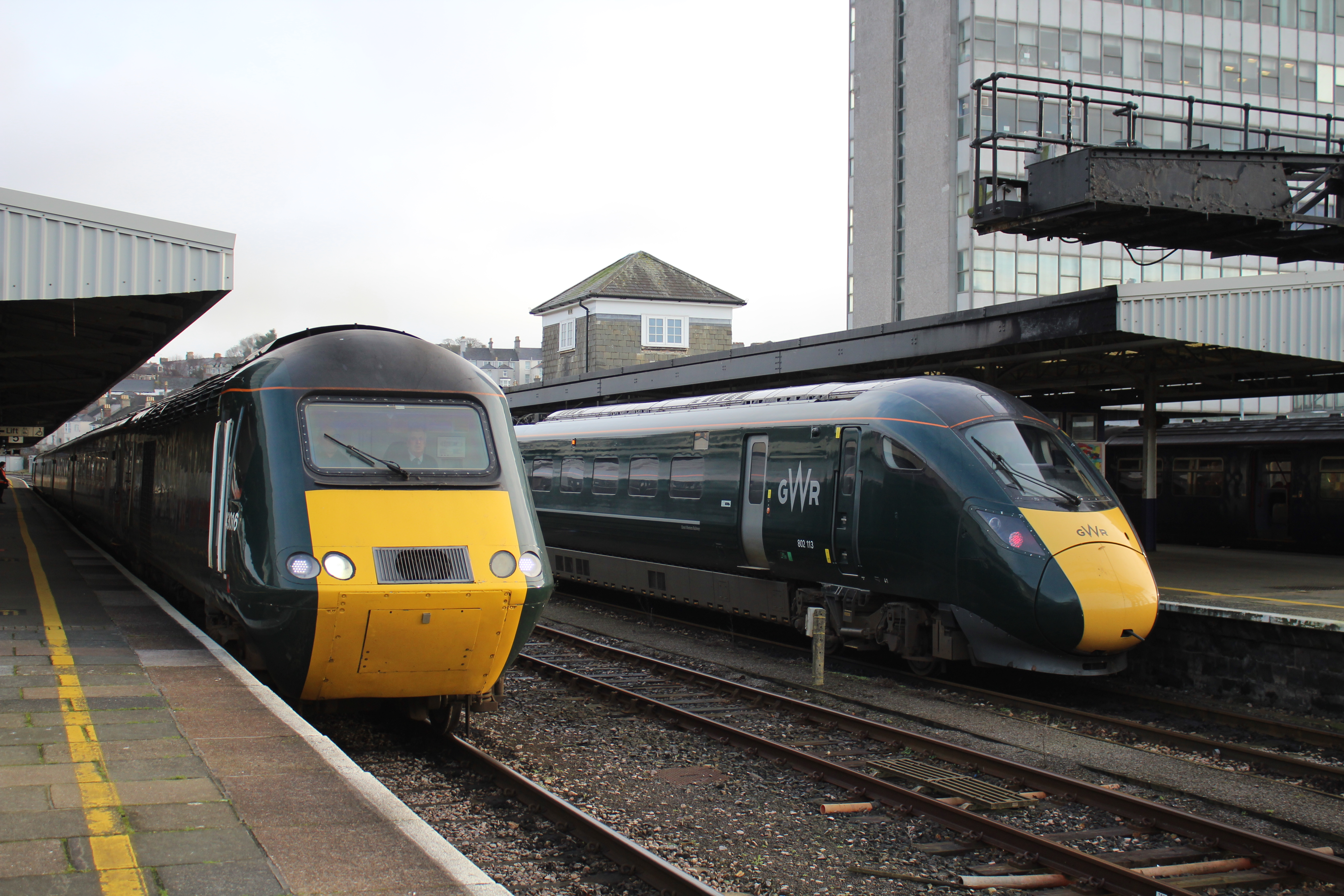
Inter-city trains at the station, operated by Great Western Railway

Plymouth railway station is served by two train operating companies:

- Great Western Railway operates inter-city services to Penzance, Exeter St Davids, Taunton, Reading, London Paddington, Bristol Temple Meads and Cardiff Central; local services run to Gunnislake. It also manages the station.
- CrossCountry operates services from the South West to the Midlands, North East and Scotland; destinations include Bristol, Birmingham New Street, Derby, Sheffield, York, Newcastle, Edinburgh Waverley, Glasgow Central and Aberdeen.

Smaller stations in the suburban area west of the city centre are served by trains on the Tamar Valley Line to Gunnislake and local services on the Cornish Main Line, which crosses the Tamar on the Royal Albert Bridge designed by Isambard Kingdom Brunel and opened in 1859.

=== Roads ===
The A38 dual-carriageway runs from east to west across the north of the city; within the city, it is known as The Parkway and represents the boundary between the older parts of the city and more recently developed suburban areas. Heading east, it connects Plymouth to the M5 motorway, about 40 miles (65 km) away near Exeter; heading west, it connects Devon with Cornwall via the Tamar Bridge.

=== Buses ===
Bus services are provided mainly by Plymouth Citybus and Stagecoach South West, but a few routes are served by smaller local operators. Long distance inter-city bus services terminate at Plymouth coach station.

There are three Park and Ride services at Milehouse, Coypool (Plympton) and George Junction (City Airport), which are operated by Stagecoach South West, except Milehouse which is served by Plymouth Citybus

=== Ferries ===
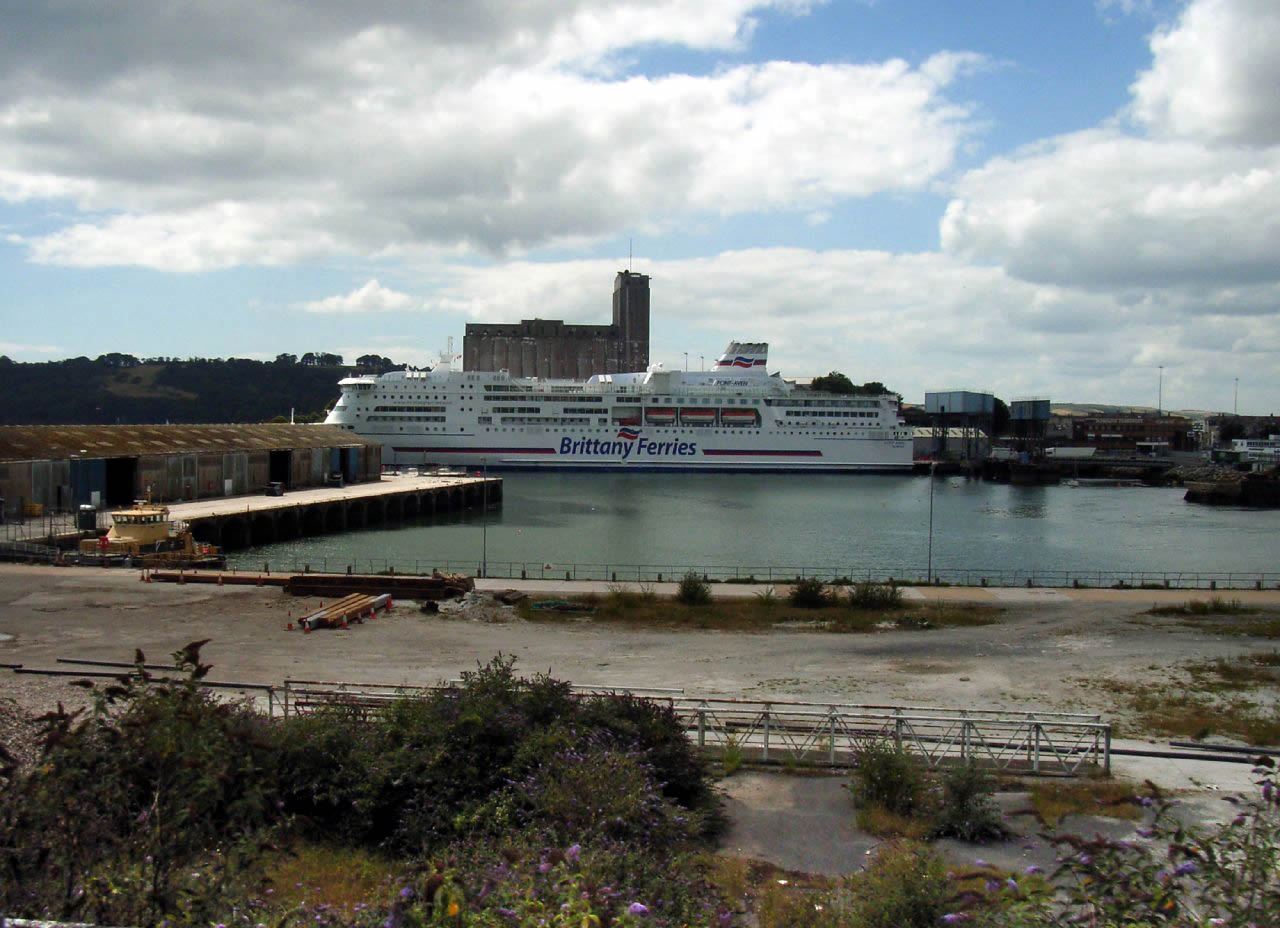
MV Pont-Aven: Brittany Ferries service to Roscoff (France) and Santander (Spain) in Millbay Docks

A regular international ferry service provided by Brittany Ferries operates from Millbay taking cars and foot passengers directly to France (Roscoff) and Spain (Santander) primarily on the two ferries, MV Armorique and MV Pont-Aven. The Cremyll Ferry is a passenger ferry between Stonehouse and the Cornish hamlet of Cremyll, which is believed to have operated continuously since 1204.

There is also a pedestrian ferry from the Mayflower Steps to Mount Batten and an alternative to using the Tamar Bridge via the Torpoint Ferry (vehicle and pedestrian) across the river.

=== Air ===
Plymouth City Airport was located about 4 miles (6 km) north of the city centre. It was home to the local airline Air Southwest, which operated flights across the United Kingdom and Ireland. In June 2003, a report by the South West RDA was published looking at the future of aviation in the south-west and the possible closure of airports. It concluded that the best option for the south-west was to close Plymouth City Airport and expand Exeter Airport and Newquay Airport, although it did conclude that this was not the best option for Plymouth.

In April 2011, it was announced that the airport would close, which it did on 23 December. A local company, FlyPlymouth, put forward plans in 2015 to reopen the airport by 2018, providing daily services to various destinations including London, but as of now, these projects have stalled.

=== Cycle routes ===
Plymouth is at the southern end of the 99-mile (159 km) long Devon Coast to Coast Cycle Route (National Cycle Route 27). The route runs mostly traffic-free on off-road sections between Ilfracombe and Plymouth. The route uses former railway lines, though there are some stretches on public roads.

== Public services ==
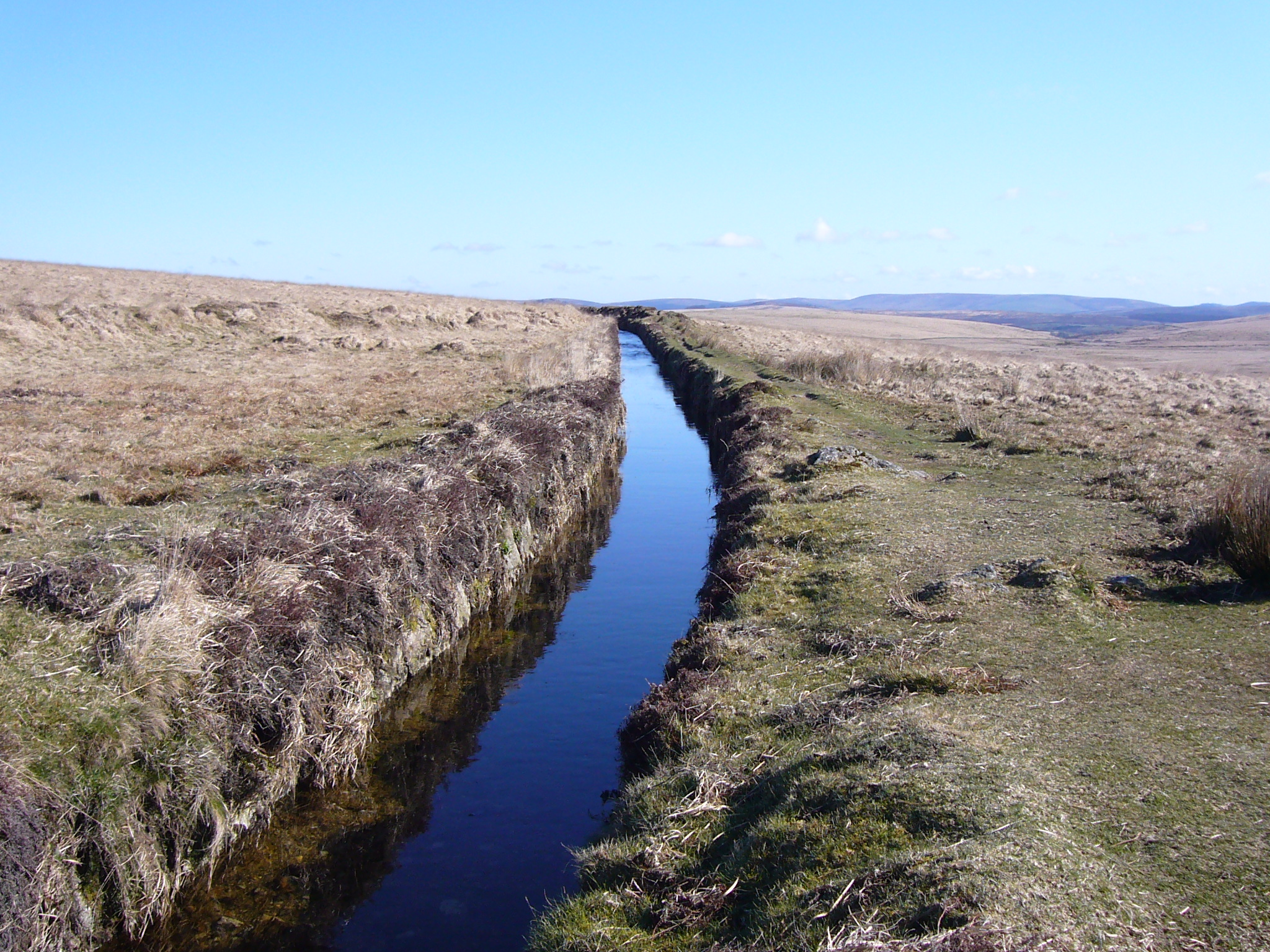
The Devonport Leat on Dartmoor, looking up stream

Since 1989 when the water industry was privatised, Plymouth has been supplied by South West Water. This was preceded by Plymouth County Borough Corporation and then by the South West Water Authority, which was formed by the Water Act 1973. Before the 19th century, two leats were built to provide drinking water for the town; they carried water from Dartmoor to Plymouth. A watercourse, known as Plymouth or Drake's Leat, was opened on 24 April 1591 to tap the river Meavy. The Devonport Leat was constructed to carry fresh drinking water to the expanding town of Devonport and its ever-growing dockyard. It was fed by three Dartmoor rivers: The West Dart, Cowsic and Blackabrook. It seems to have been carrying water since 1797, but it was officially completed in 1801. It was originally designed to carry water to Devonport town but has since been shortened and now carries water to Burrator Reservoir, which feeds most of the water supply of Plymouth. Burrator Reservoir is located about 5 miles (8 km) north of the city and was constructed in 1898 and expanded in 1928.

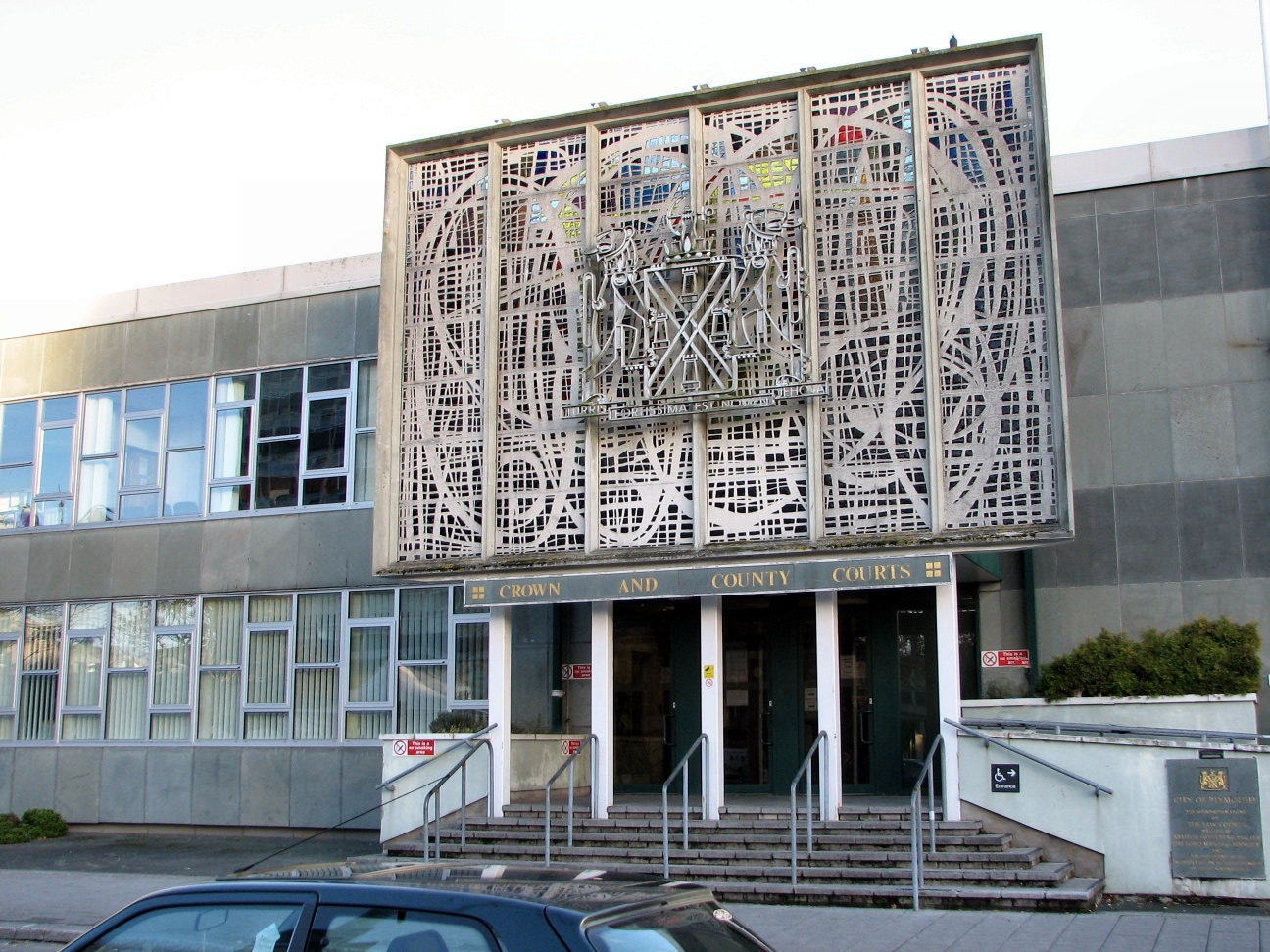
The Plymouth Combined Crown and County Court Centre

Plymouth City Council is responsible for waste management throughout the city and South West Water is responsible for sewerage. Plymouth's electricity is supplied from the National Grid and distributed to Plymouth via Western Power Distribution. On the outskirts of Plympton, a combined cycle gas-powered station, the Langage Power Station, which started to produce electricity for Plymouth at the end of 2009.

His Majesty's Courts and Tribunals Service provide a magistrates' court and a Combined Crown and County Court Centre in the city.

The Plymouth Borough Police, formed in 1836, eventually became part of Devon and Cornwall Constabulary. There are police stations at Charles Cross and Crownhill (the divisional HQ) and smaller stations at Plympton and Plymstock. The city has one of the Devon and Cornwall Area Crown Prosecution Service divisional offices.

Plymouth has five fire stations located in Camel's Head, Crownhill, Greenbank, Plympton and Plymstock which is part of Devon and Somerset Fire and Rescue Service.

The Royal National Lifeboat Institution has Atlantic 85 and Severn-class lifeboats at Plymouth Lifeboat Station.

The city is served by Plymouth Hospitals NHS Trust and its NHS hospital is Derriford Hospital 4 miles (6 km) north of the city centre. The Royal Eye Infirmary is located at Derriford Hospital. South Western Ambulance Service NHS Foundation Trust operates in Plymouth and the rest of the south west; its headquarters are in Exeter.

The mid-19th-century burial ground at Ford Park Cemetery was reopened by a successful trust formed in 2000 and the city council operates two large early-20th century cemeteries at Weston Mill and Efford, both with crematoria and chapels. There is also a privately owned cemetery on the outskirts of the city, Drake Memorial Park, which does not allow headstones to mark graves, but a brass plaque set into the ground.

== Religion ==
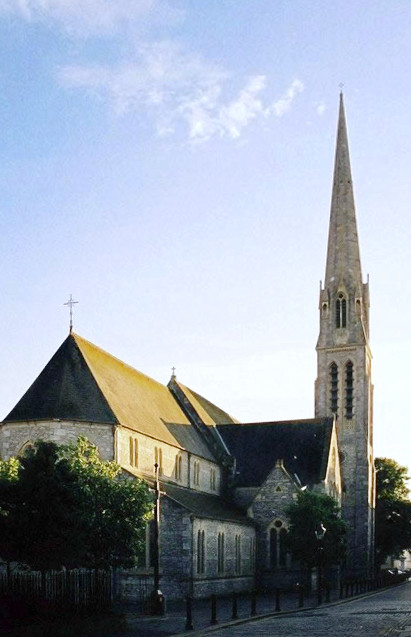
The Roman Catholic Cathedral Church of Saint Mary and Saint Boniface (Stonehouse)

Plymouth has about 150 churches city-wide. The Plymouth Cathedral is Roman Catholic, and is located in Stonehouse. It was opened in 1858, and consecrated in 1880. The city's oldest church is Plymouth Minster, also known as St Andrew's Church, (Anglican) located at the top of Royal Parade; it is the largest parish church in Devon and has been a site of gathering since AD 800.

The city also includes five Baptist churches, over twenty Methodist chapels, and thirteen Roman Catholic churches.

In 1831, the first Brethren assembly in England, a movement of conservative non-denominational evangelical Christians, was established in the city, so that Brethren are often called Plymouth Brethren, although the movement did not begin locally.

Plymouth has the first known reference to Jews in the South West from Sir Francis Drake's voyages in 1577 to 1580, as his log mentioned "Moses the Jew" – a man from Plymouth. The Plymouth Synagogue is a Listed Grade II* building, built in 1762 and is the oldest Ashkenazi Synagogue in the English speaking world. There are also places of worship for Islam, Baháʼí, Buddhism, Unitarianism, Chinese beliefs and Humanism.

In the 2011 census, 58.1% of the population described themselves as being at least nominally Christian and 0.8% as Muslim, with all other religions represented by less than 0.5% each. The portion of people without a religion is 32.9%; above the national average of 24.7%. 7.1% did not state their religious belief. Since the 2001 Census, the number of Christians and Jews has decreased (−16% and −7% respectively), while all other religions have increased and non-religious people have almost doubled in number.

== Culture ==
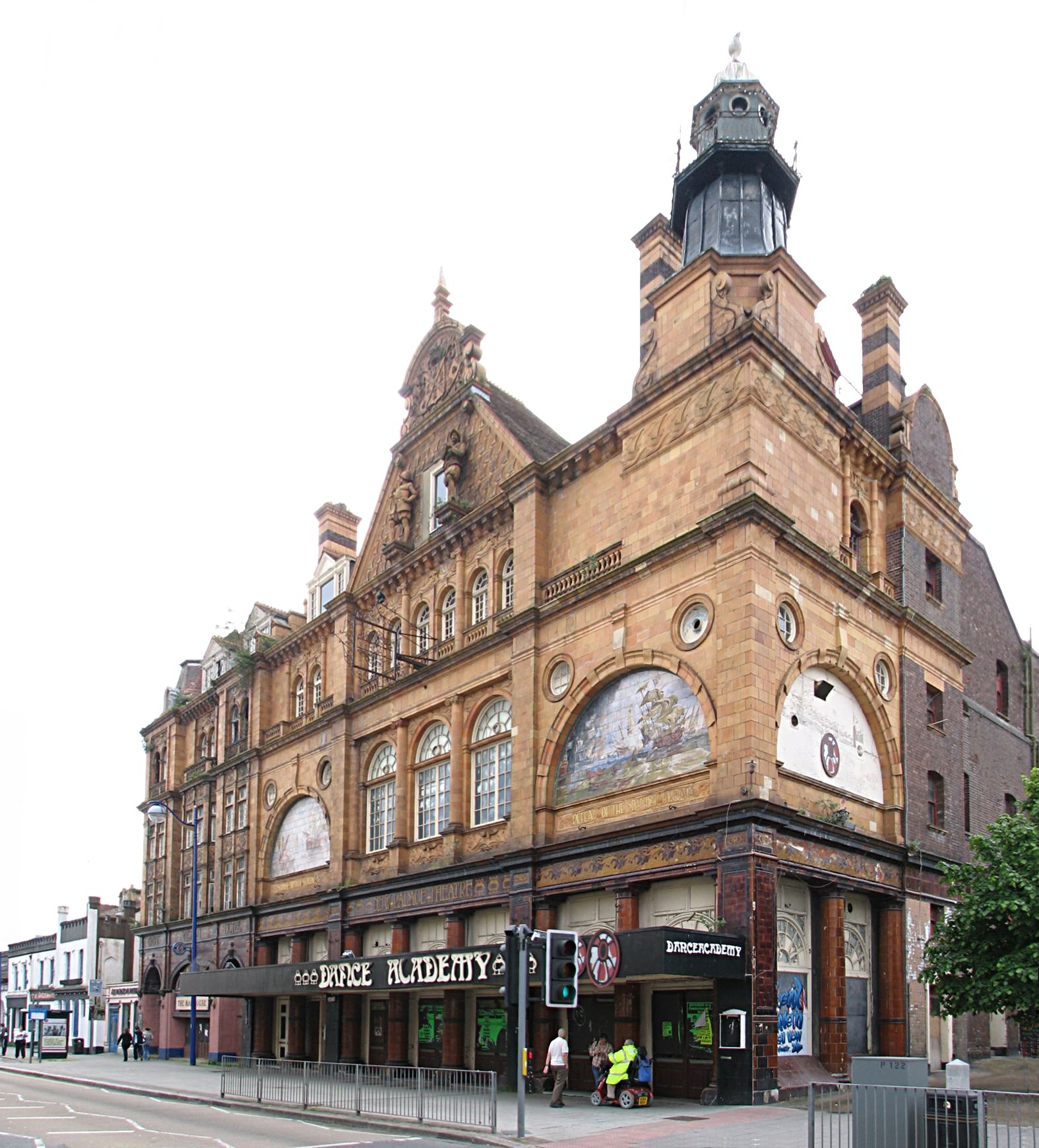
The New Palace Theatre in 2008

Built in 1815, Union Street was at the heart of Plymouth's historical culture. It became known as the servicemen's playground, as it was where sailors from the Royal Navy would seek entertainment of all kinds. During the 1930s, there were 30 pubs and it attracted such performers as Charlie Chaplin to the New Palace Theatre. It was described in 2008 as the late-night hub of Plymouth's entertainment strip.

Outdoor events and festivals are held including the annual British Firework Championships in August, which attracts tens of thousands of people across the waterfront. In August 2006 the world record for the most simultaneous fireworks was surpassed, by Roy Lowry of the University of Plymouth, over Plymouth Sound. From 2014, MTV Crashes Plymouth has taken place every July on Plymouth Hoe, hosting big-name acts such as The 1975, Little Mix, Tinie Tempah and Busted.

Between 1992 and 2012, the Music of the Night celebration was performed in the Royal Citadel by the 29 Commando Regiment and local performers to raise money for local and military charities. A number of other smaller cultural events taken place annually, including Plymouth Art Weekender, Plymouth Fringe Festival and Illuminate Festival.

The city's main theatre is Theatre Royal Plymouth, presenting large-scale West End shows and smaller works as well as an extensive education and outreach programme. The main building is located in the city centre and contains three performance spaces – The Lyric (1,315 capacity), Drum Theatre (200 capacity) and The Lab (60 capacity) – and they also run their own specialised production and creative learning centre called TR2, based in Cattedown. Plymouth Pavilions has multiple uses for the city staging music concerts, basketball matches and stand-up comedy. There are also three cinemas: Reel Cinema at Derrys Cross, Plymouth Arts Centre at Looe Street and a Vue cinema at the Barbican Leisure Park. The Barbican Theatre delivers a theatre and dance programme of performances and workshops, focused on young people and emerging artists contains a main auditorium (110 – 140 capacity) and rehearsal studio. It also hosts the B-Bar (80 capacity), which offers a programme of music, comedy and spoken word performance.

The Plymouth Athenaeum, which includes a local interest library, is a society dedicated to the promotion of learning in the fields of science, technology, literature and art. In 2017, its auditorium with a capacity of 340, returned to use as a theatre, having been out of service since 2009.

The Plymouth City Museum and Art Gallery, now renamed as The Box, is operated by Plymouth City Council allowing free admission – it has six galleries.

== Media ==
Plymouth is the regional television centre of BBC South West. A team of journalists are headquartered at Plymouth for the ITV West Country regional station, after a merger with ITV West forced ITV Westcountry to close on 16 February 2009.

The main local newspapers are The Herald, Western Morning News and the Plymouth Chronicle.

Greatest Hits Radio Plymouth, BBC Radio Devon, Radio Exe Devon and Heart West are the local radio stations with the most listeners.

== Sport ==
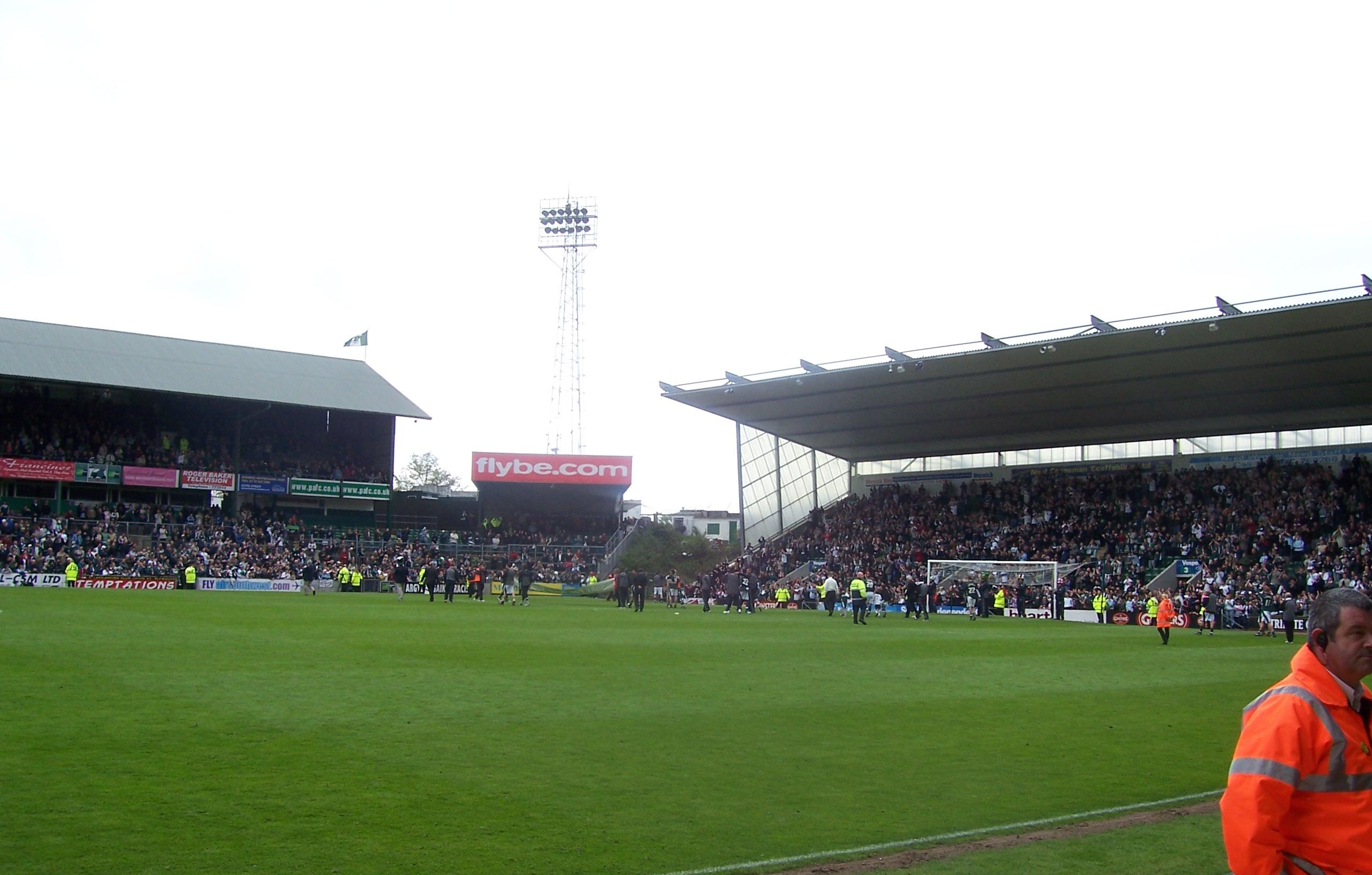
Home Park

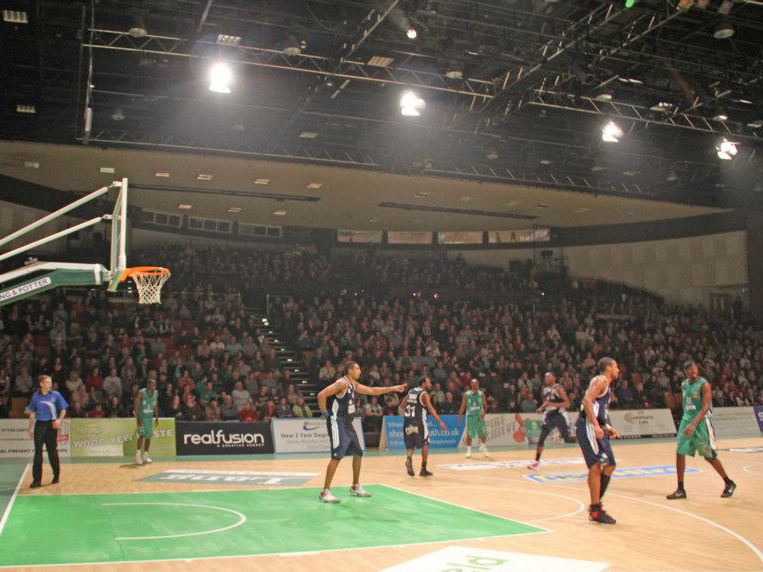
Plymouth Pavilions, home to the Plymouth City Patriots

Plymouth is home to Plymouth Argyle F.C. which, as of the 2025-26 season, plays in the third tier of English football, Sky Bet League One. The team's home ground is called Home Park and is located next to Central Park. It links itself with the group of English non-conformists that left Plymouth for the New World in 1620: its nickname is "The Pilgrims". The city also has three non-league football clubs; Plymouth Parkway who play at Bolitho Park, Elburton Villa who play at Haye Road and Plymstock United who play at Dean Cross. Plymouth Parkway were promoted to the Western League from the South West Peninsula League in 2018, and after two Covid-19 interrupted years to the Southern Football League in 2021, whilst Elburton Villa and Plymstock United continue to compete in the South West Peninsula League.

Plymouth Albion Rugby Football Club is a rugby union club that was founded in 1875 and is currently competing in the National League 1, the third tier of professional English rugby; it plays at the Brickfields.

In basketball, the city is represented by two teams: Plymouth City Patriots, of the top-tier British Basketball League, and Plymouth Raiders of the National Basketball League.

Plymouth Gladiators is a speedway team, currently competing in the Championship, with home meetings taking place at the Plymouth Coliseum. Plymouth cricket club was formed in 1843, the current 1st XI play in the Devon Premier League. The city is also home to Plymouth Marjons Hockey Club, with their 1st XI playing in the National League last season. Plymouth Mariners baseball club play in the South West Baseball League, they play their home games at Wilson Field in Central Park.

The city is an important centre for water sports, especially scuba diving and sailing. The Port of Plymouth Regatta is one of the oldest regattas in the world, and has been held regularly since 1823. In September 2011, Plymouth hosted the America's Cup World Series for nine days.

== Landmarks and tourist attractions ==
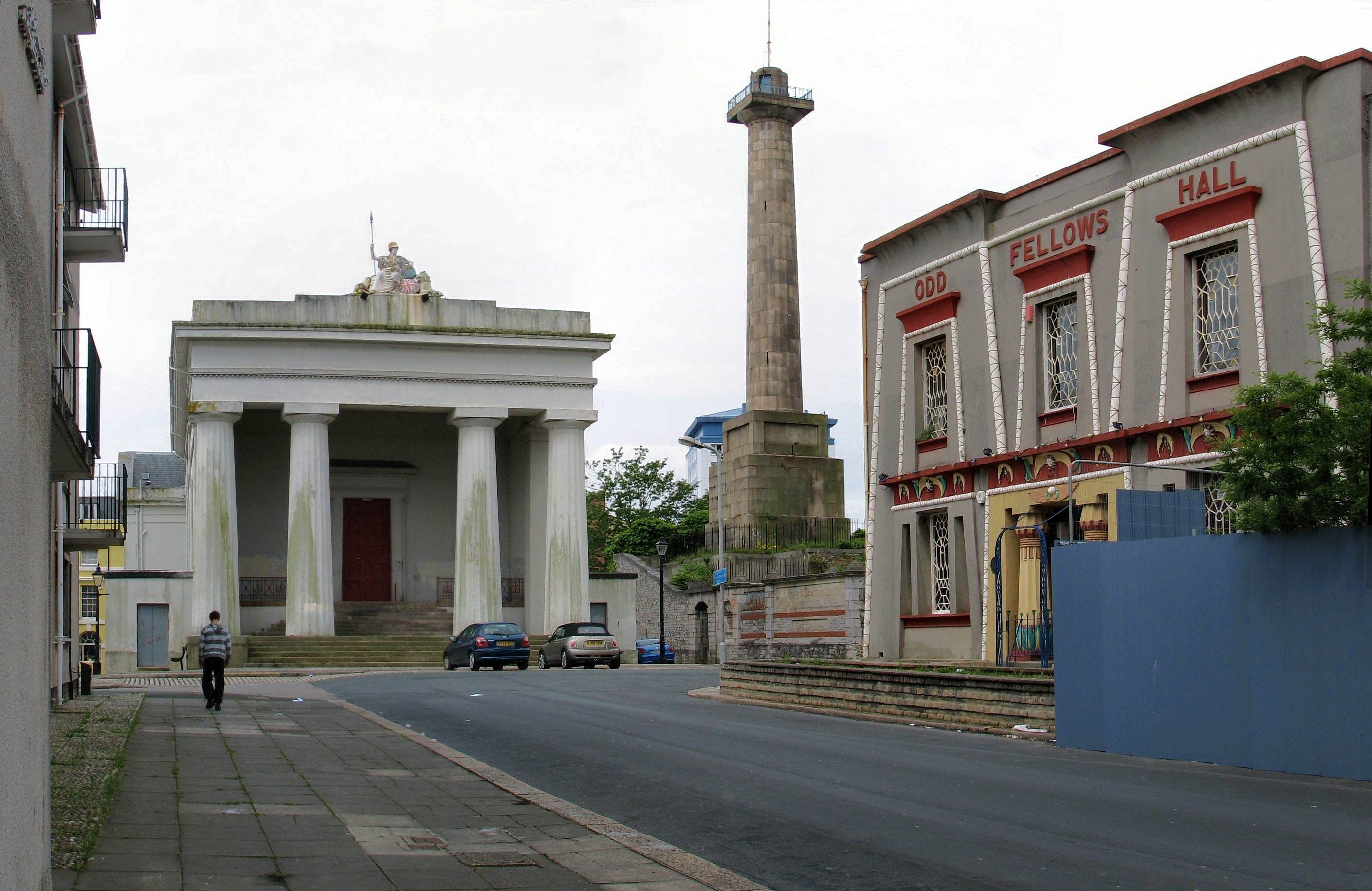
Grade I listed Town Hall, Column and Library in Devonport

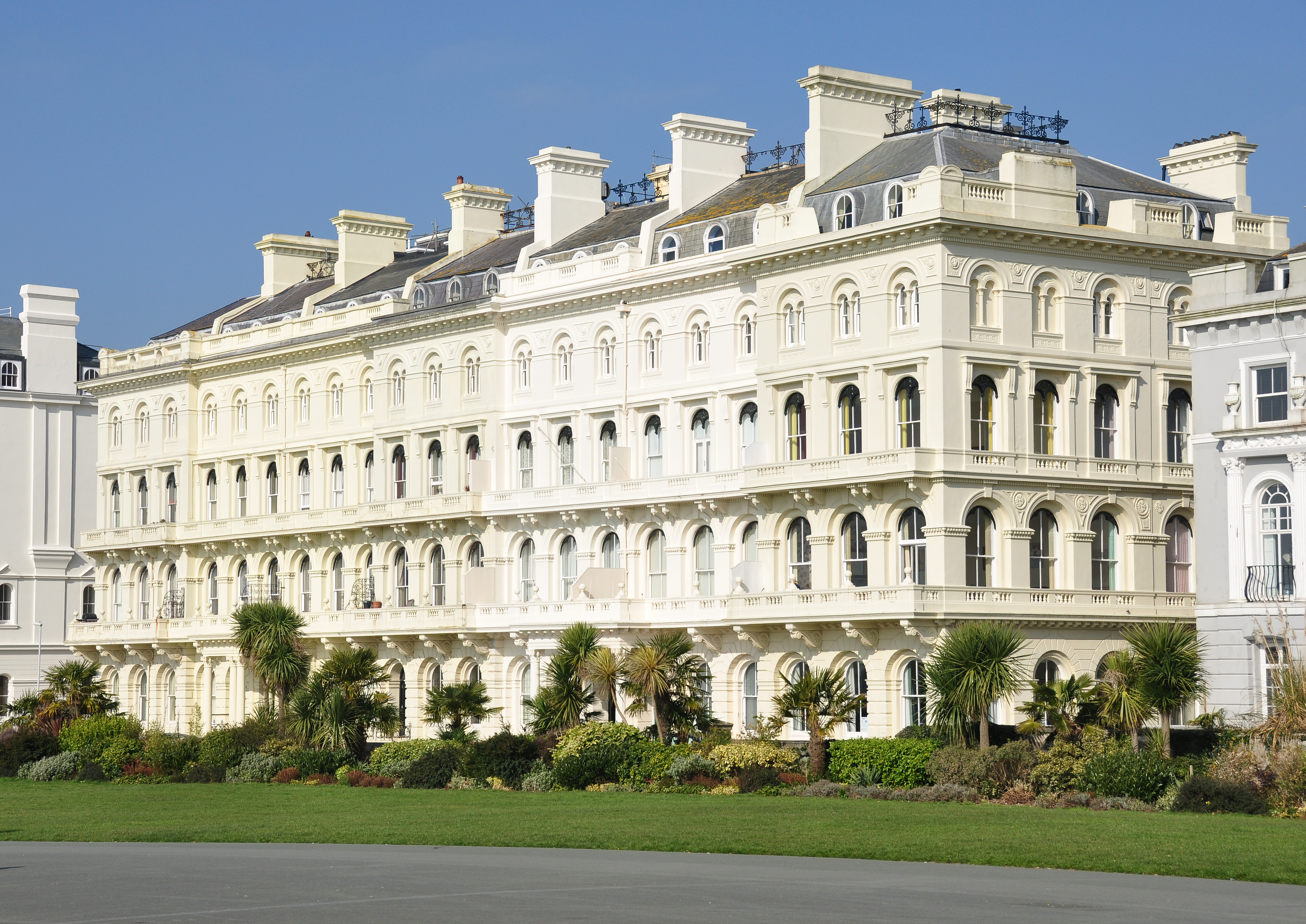
Elliot Terrace, Plymouth Hoe

After the English Civil War the Royal Citadel was erected in 1666 towards the eastern section of Plymouth Hoe, to defend the port from naval attacks, suppress Plymothian Parliamentary leanings and to train the armed forces. Currently, guided tours are available in the summer months. Further west is Smeaton's Tower, which is a standard lighthouse that was constructed in 1759; it was dismantled in 1877 and the top two-thirds were reassembled on Plymouth Hoe. It is open to the public and has views over the Plymouth Sound and the city from the lantern room. Plymouth has 20 war memorials of which nine are on The Hoe including: Plymouth Naval Memorial, to remember those killed in World Wars I and II who have no known grave, and the Armada Memorial to commemorate the defeat of the Spanish Armada.

The early port settlement of the city, called Sutton, approximates to the area now referred to as the Barbican and has 100 listed buildings and the largest concentration of cobbled streets in Britain. The Pilgrim Fathers left for the New World in 1620 near the commemorative Mayflower Steps in Sutton Pool. Also on Sutton Pool is the National Marine Aquarium, which displays 400 marine species and includes Britain's deepest aquarium tank.

On the opposite side of the Plym, 1 mile (1.6 km) upstream, is the Saltram estate which has a Jacobean and Georgian mansion.

On the northern outskirts of the city, Crownhill Fort is a well-restored example of a "Palmerston's Folly". It is owned by the Landmark Trust and is open to the public.

To the west of the city is Devonport, one of the city's historic quarters. As part of its millennium regeneration project, the Devonport Heritage Trail has been introduced, complete with over 70 waymarkers outlining the route.

Plymouth is often used as a base by visitors to Dartmoor, the Tamar Valley and the beaches of south-east Cornwall; Kingsand, Cawsand and Whitsand Bay are especially popular.

The Roland Levinsky Building, the landmark building of the University of Plymouth, is located in the city's central quarter. Designed by leading architect Henning Larsen, the building was opened in 2008 and houses the university's Arts faculty.

Beckley Point, at 20 storeys and 78 metres (256 ft) in height, is the city's tallest building and was completed on 8 February 2018. It was designed by Boyes Rees Architects and built by contractors Kier Group.

Images of landmarks

Smeaton's Tower

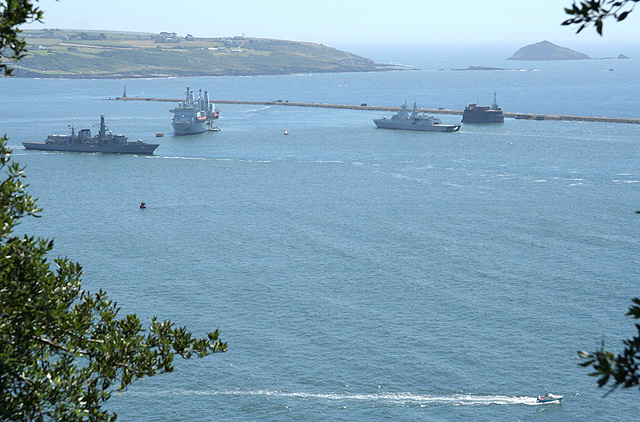
Plymouth Sound and Breakwater

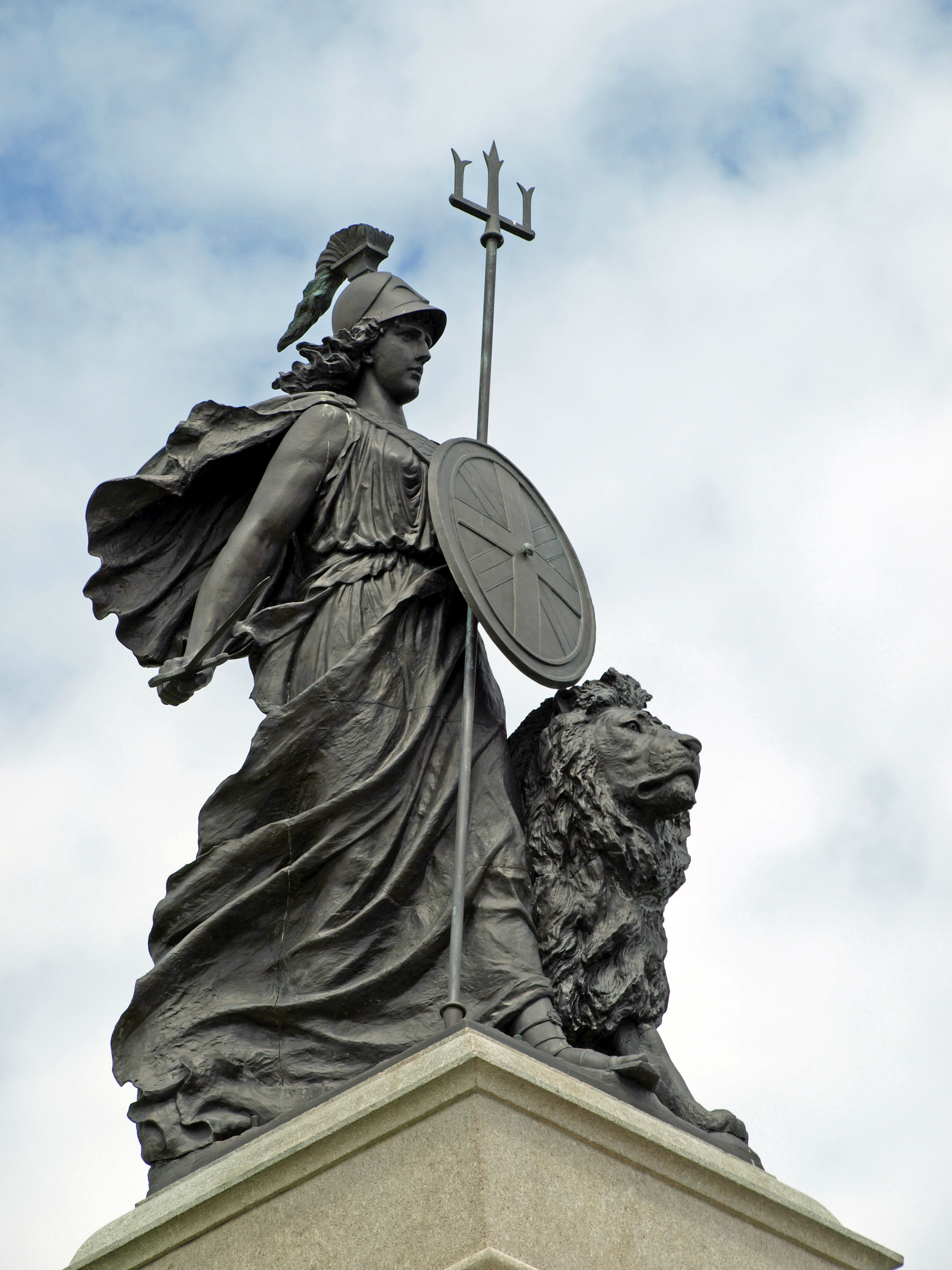
National Armada memorial (Britannia)

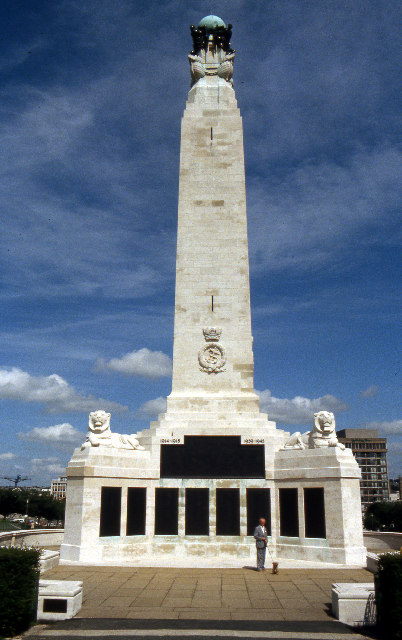
Naval War Memorial

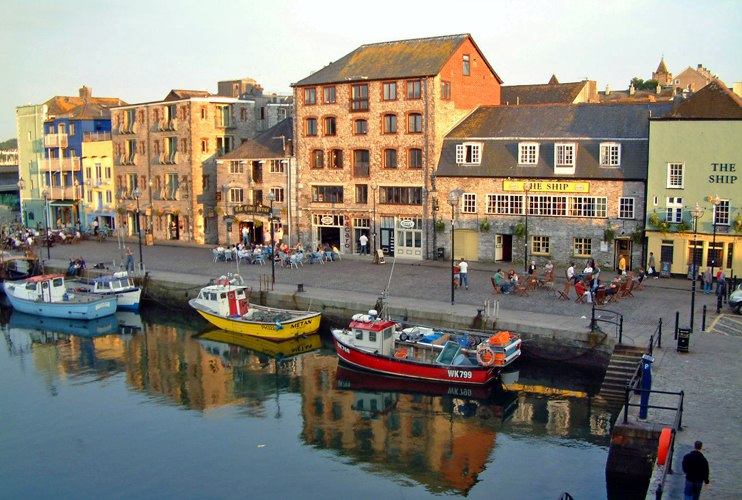
The Parade, Barbican

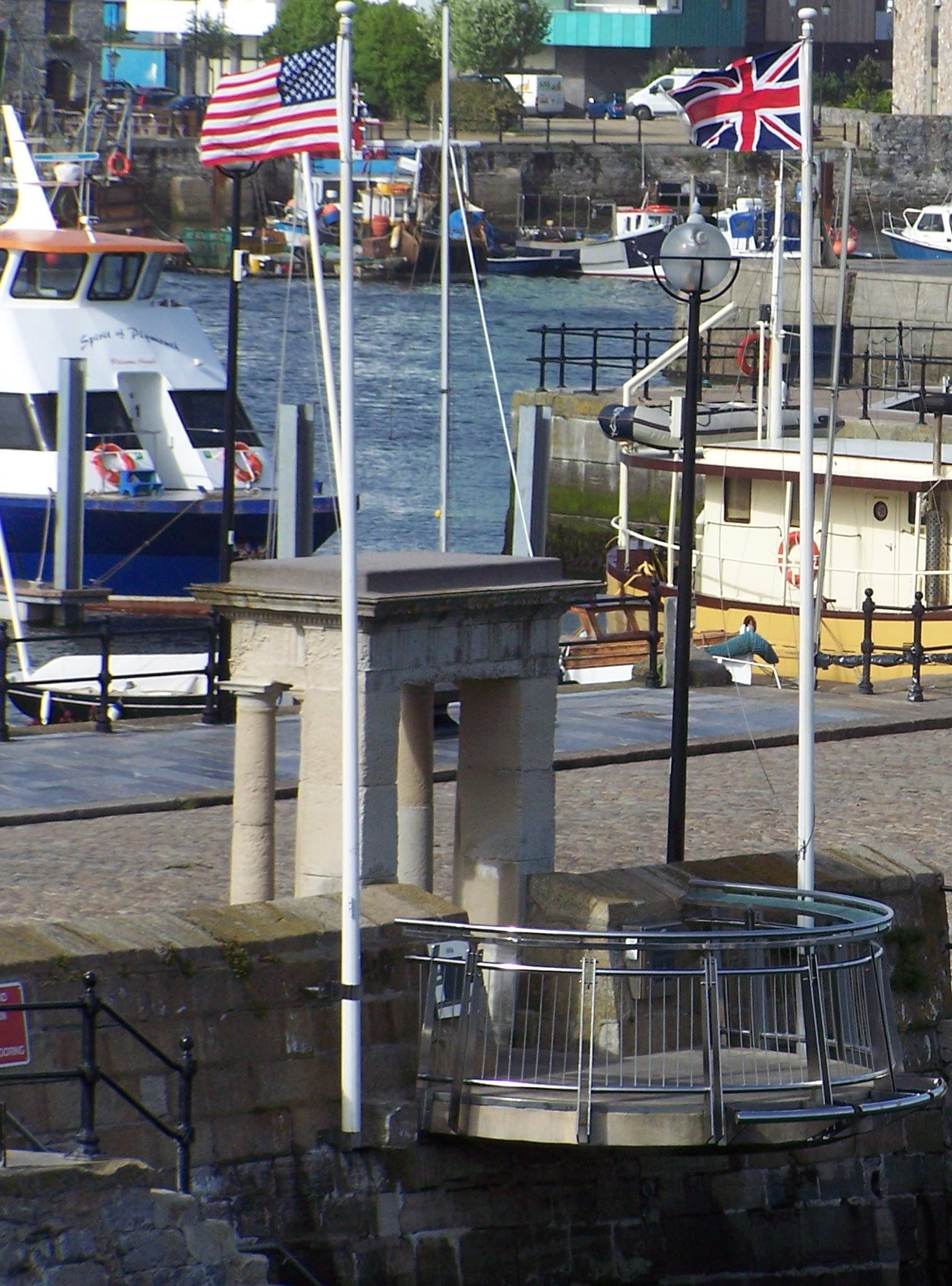
The Mayflower Steps Memorial

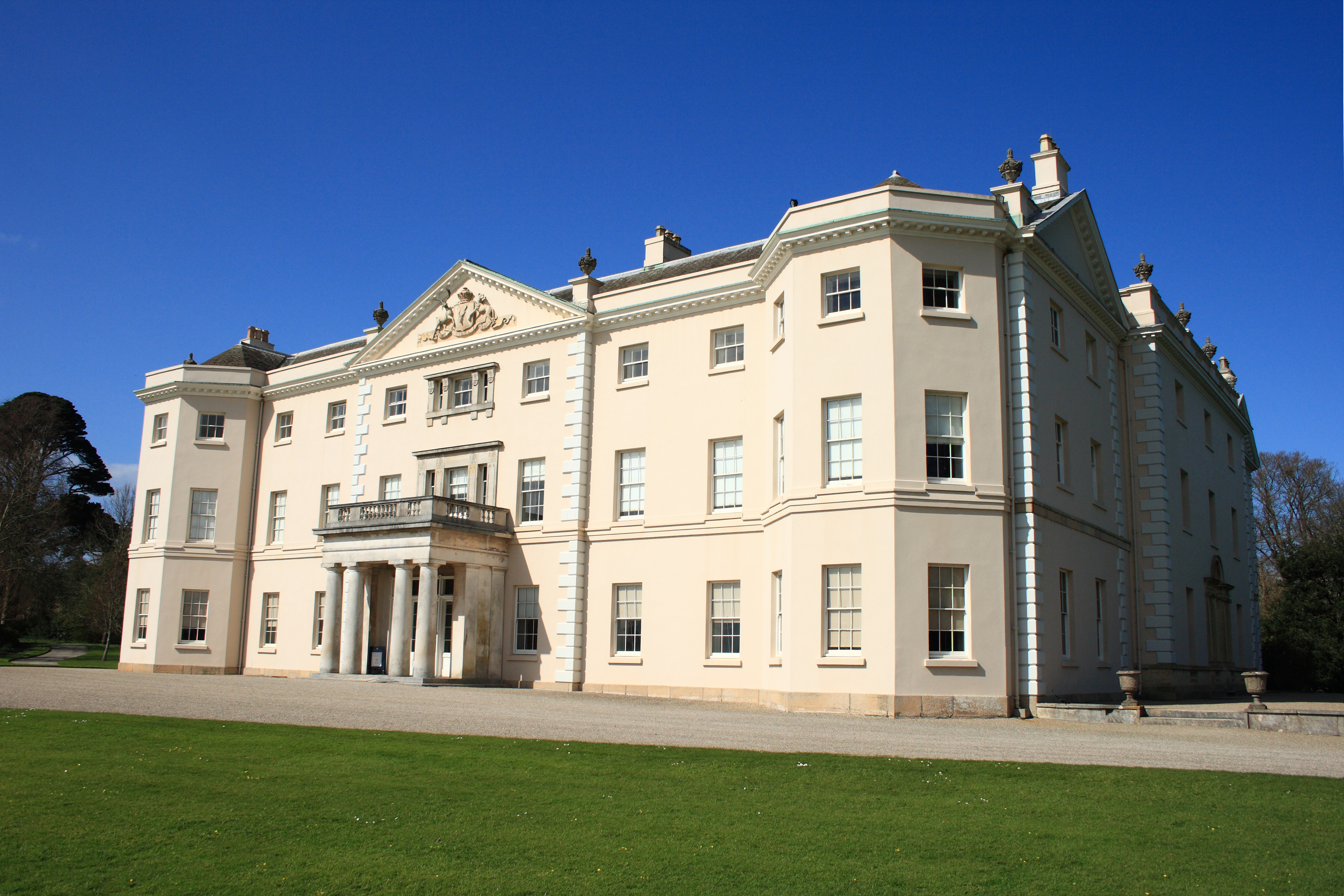
Saltram House remodelled by the architect Robert Adam

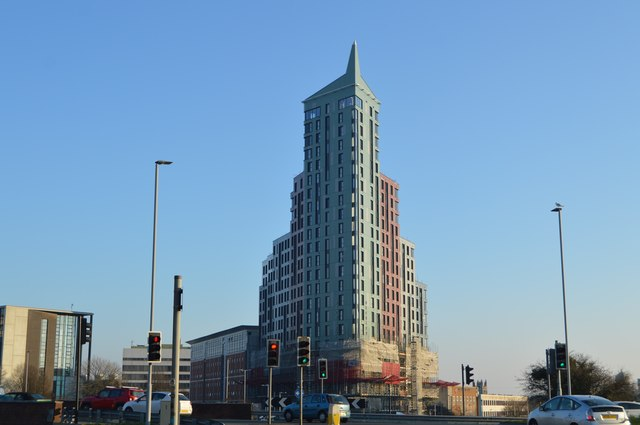
Beckley Point

== Notable people ==
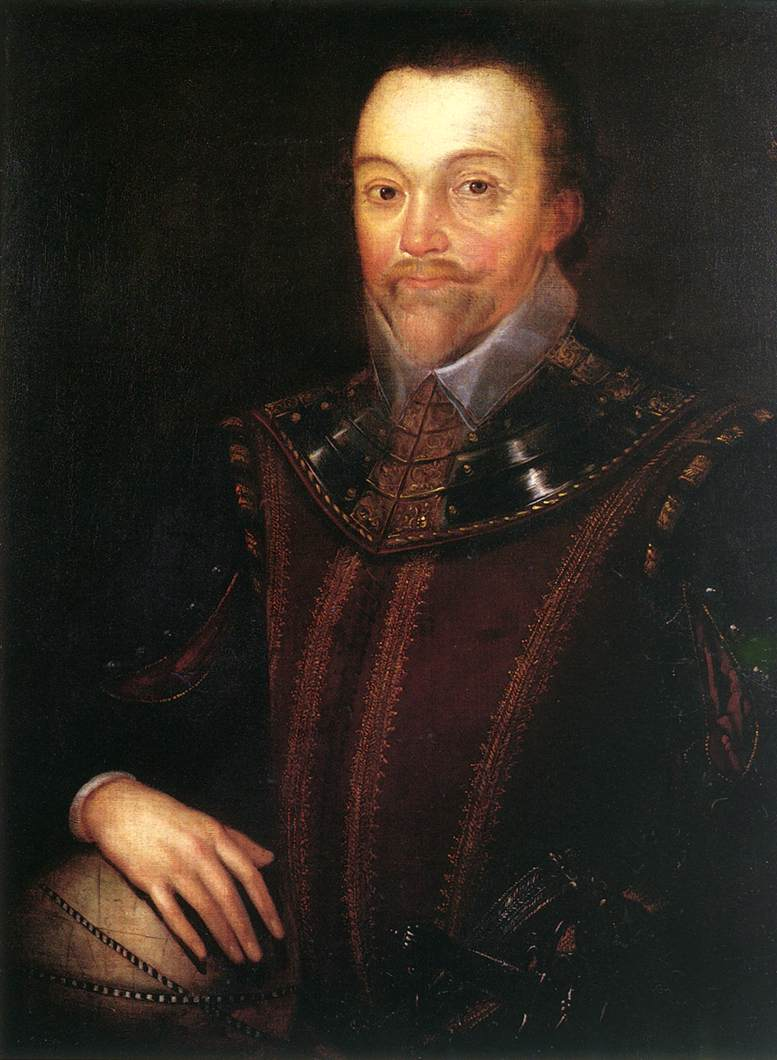
Sir Francis Drake

People from Plymouth are known as Plymothians or less formally as Janners. Its meaning is described as a person from Devon, deriving from Cousin Jan, (Note: The Devon form of John.) but more particularly in naval circles anyone from the Plymouth area.

The Elizabethan navigator, Sir Francis Drake, was born in the nearby town of Tavistock and was the mayor of Plymouth. He was the first Englishman to circumnavigate the world and was known by the Spanish as El Draco meaning "The Dragon" after he raided many of their ships. He died of dysentery in 1596 off the coast of Portobelo, Panama. In 2002, a mission to recover his body and bring it to Plymouth was allowed by the Ministry of Defence. His cousin and contemporary John Hawkins was a Plymouth man.

Painter Sir Joshua Reynolds, founder and first president of the Royal Academy was born and educated in nearby Plympton, now part of Plymouth. William Cookworthy, born in Kingsbridge, set up his successful porcelain business in the city and was a close friend of John Smeaton, designer of the Eddystone Lighthouse. Benjamin Robert Haydon, an English painter who specialised in grand historical pictures, was born here in 1786. The naturalist William Elford Leach, who did much to pave the way in Britain for Charles Darwin, was born at Hoe Gate in 1791.

Antarctic explorers Robert Falcon Scott, who was born in Plymouth, and Frank Bickerton both lived in the city. Artists include Beryl Cook whose paintings depict the culture of Plymouth and Robert Lenkiewicz, whose paintings investigated themes of vagrancy, sexual behaviour and suicide, lived in the city from the 1960s until his death in 2002. Illustrator and creator of children's series Mr Benn and King Rollo, David McKee, was born and brought up in South Devon and trained at Plymouth College of Art. Jazz musician John Surman, born in nearby Tavistock, has close connections to the area, evidenced by his 2012 album Saltash Bells. The avant-garde prepared guitarist Keith Rowe was born in the city, before establishing the jazz free improvisation band AMM in London in 1965 and MIMEO in 1997. The musician and film director Cosmo Jarvis has lived in several towns in South Devon; he has filmed videos in and around Plymouth. In addition, actors Sir Donald Sinden and Judi Trott were born in Plymouth. George Passmore of Turner Prize winning duo Gilbert and George was also born in the city, as was Labour politician Michael Foot whose family reside at nearby Trematon Castle.

Notable athletes include swimmer Sharron Davies, diver Tom Daley, dancer Wayne Sleep and footballer Trevor Francis. Other past residents include composer journalist and newspaper editor William Henry Wills, film music composer Ron Goodwin, journalist Angela Rippon and comedian Dawn French. Canadian politician and legal scholar Chris Axworthy hailed from Plymouth. America based actor Donald Moffat, whose roles include American vice president Lyndon B. Johnson in the film The Right Stuff and fictional president Bennett in Clear and Present Danger, was born in Plymouth. Canadian actor Mark Holden was also born in Plymouth. Kevin Owen is an international TV news anchor who was born in Freedom Fields Hospital, while his father served as a Royal Navy officer. Cambridge spy Guy Burgess was born at 2 Albemarle Villas, Stoke, whilst his father was a serving Royal Navy officer. The humanitarian Harrison Dax Nash is also from Plymouth.

== Twin cities ==
Plymouth City Council is formally twinned with:

- Brest, France (1963)
- Gdynia, Poland (1976)
- Novorossiysk, Russia (1990) (Note: Twinning was suspended in 2022.)
- San Sebastián, Spain (1990)
- Plymouth, Massachusetts, United States (2001).

== Freedom of the city ==
The following people, military units, organisations and groups have received the Freedom of the City of Plymouth:

=== Individuals ===
- John Henry Ellis: 9 November 1917
- Walter Hines Page: 17 September 1918
- Prince of Wales (later the Duke of Windsor): 13 June 1919
- Sir Thomas Baker: 13 October 1919
- Sir Henry Duke (later the Lord Merrivale): 14 March 1924
- Sir John Winnicott: 9 November 1934
- The Viscount Astor: 2 July 1936
- Jan Smuts: 9 November 1942
- Sir James Clifford Tozer: 8 September 1952
- Hubert Moses Medland: 9 September 1952
- Nancy Astor, Viscountess Astor: 16 July 1959
- Henry George Mason: 6 December 1965
- Ronald George King: 20 December 1972
- Harold Miller Pattinson: 20 December 1972
- Leslie Francis Paul: 20 December 1972
- Frederick John Stott: 20 December 1972
- Baroness Vickers of Devonport: 26 November 1982
- Michael Foot: 26 November 1982
- George Ernest Hillyer Creber: 26 November 1982
- Ivor Clarence Lowe: 26 November 1982
- John Joseph Ingham: 1 April 1998
- Thomas Edward Savery: 1 April 1998
- Arthur Raymond Stanley Floyd: 1 April 1998
- Sheila Anne Cassidy: 1 April 1998
- Sylvia Irence Brice: 1 April 1998
- Lord Owen: 23 March 2001
- Baroness Fookes of Plymouth: 23 March 2001
- Dennis Howard Dicker: 23 March 2001
- Reginald Cyril James: 23 March 2001
- Jean Nelder: 23 November 2015
- Sam Philpott: 23 November 2015
- Angela Rippon: 23 November 2015
- David Stark: 23 November 2015
- Mark Ormrod: 22 November 2021.
- Thomas Robert Daley: 17 February 2022.
- Lewis Pugh: 27 March 2023
- Heather Knight: 27 March 2023
- Sir Gary Streeter: 27 January 2025
- Kevin Nancekivell: 27 January 2025
- Linda Gilroy: 27 January 2025.

=== Military units ===
- Royal Marines: 7 May 1955
- Plymouth Command of The Royal Navy: 26 September 1963
- The Devonshire and Dorset Regiment: 19 March 1988
- 29th Commando Regiment Royal Artillery: 29 January 1996
- Royal Navy Reserve - HMS VIVID: 23 June 2008
- The Merchant Navy: 22 March 2009.
- The Rifles: 25 September 2010.
- The Ministry of Defence Hospital Unit Derriford: 30 January 2023.

=== Organisations and groups ===
- Veterans of the Falklands War: 25 June 2022.
- The Federation of Plymouth and District Ex-Services Associations: 19 June 2023.

== See also ==
- Fortifications of Plymouth
- Grade I listed buildings in Plymouth
- Grade II* listed buildings in Plymouth
