= Thomas Lee (1794–1834) =

English architect

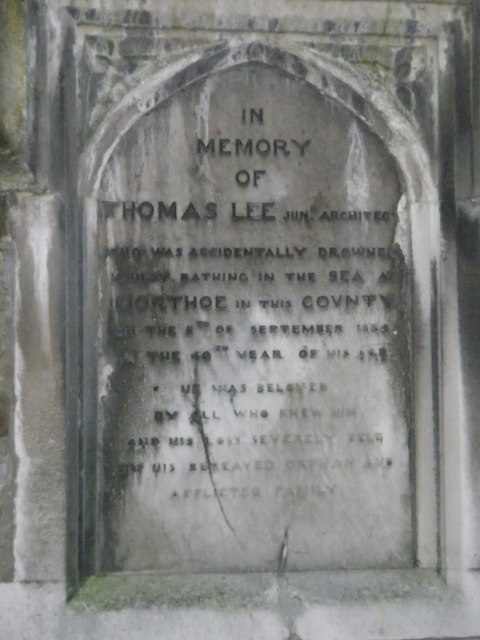
Memorial to Thomas Lee, Junior, at St. Anne's Chapel, Barnstaple

Thomas Lee (Jnr) (1794 – 5 September 1834), the son of Thomas Lee of Barnstaple, Devon, was an English architect.

He was educated at Barnstaple Grammar School and left to train briefly in 1810 at Sir John Soane's office, where his father no doubt placed him, but left for the office of David Laing. He was also admitted to the Royal Academy School in 1812 and won a Royal Academy silver medal in 1816, for a drawing of Lord Burlington's villa at Chiswick, and a gold medal from the Society of Arts, for a design for a British Senate House.

His first major work was the Wellington Monument, Somerset. Lee's further work was characterised as "eclectic" by Howard Colvin, who instanced the pared-down Soanean neoclassicism of Arlington Court, Devonshire (1820-23 for Col. J.P. Chichester), the Tudor Gothic Eggesford House, Devon (1822 for Hon. Newton Fellowes; now a ruin), several "Commissioners' Gothic" churches in Worcestershire, Cheshire and Staffordshire, as well as an unusually early neo-Norman one. In 1826 he designed the Guildhall in Barnstaple (finished 1828 and currently being restored) which makes an impressive frontage for the later Pannier Market.

In 1834 he died in a swimming accident at Mortehoe, near Barnstaple

His brother, Frederick Richard Lee was a successful painter.

== Notes ==
see "Some men who made Barnstaple..." 2010 by Pauline Brain
