= Pannier Market, Torrington =

Indoor market in Great Torrington, Devon, England

Coordinates: 50.9514°N 4.1421°W

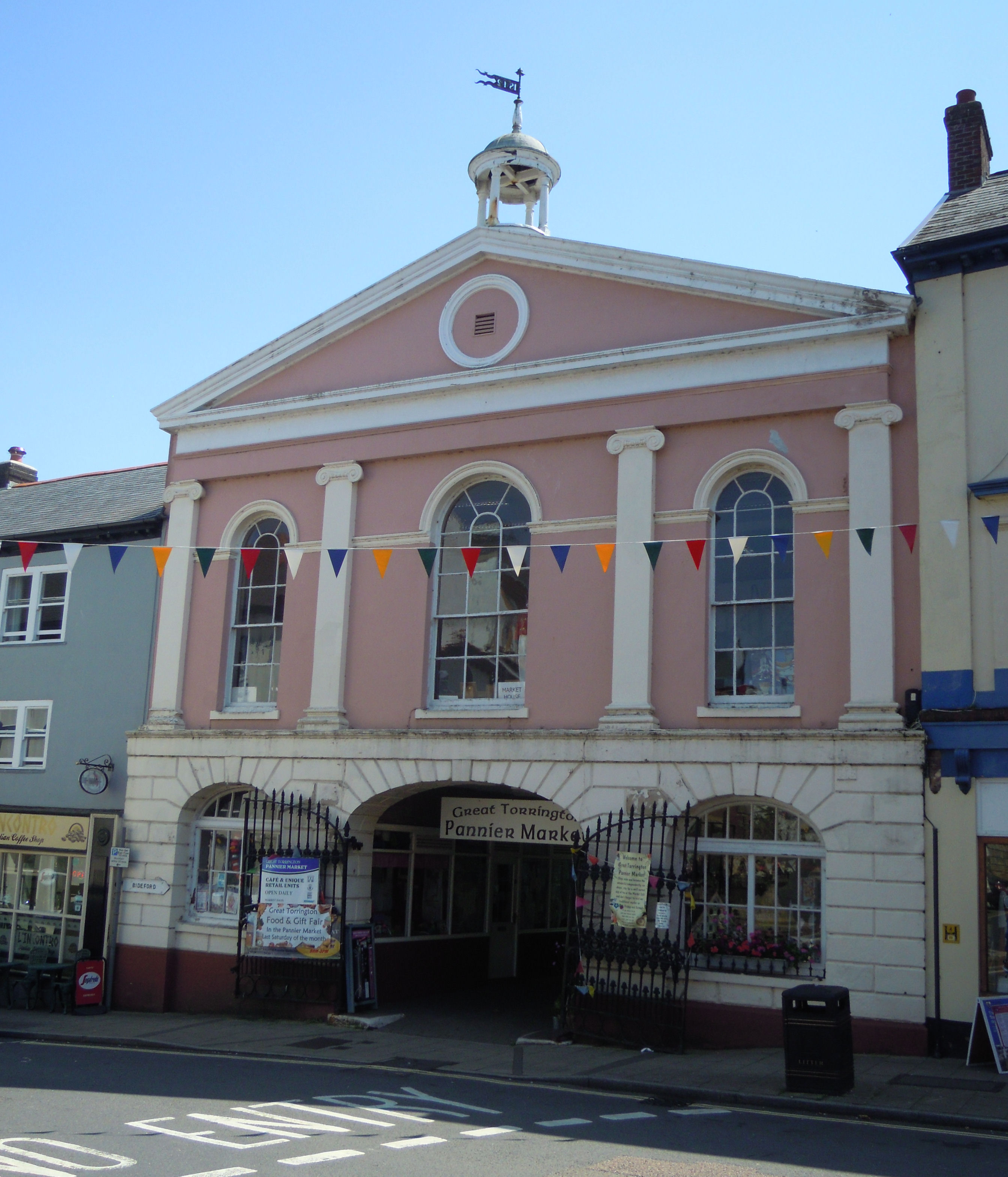
The Market House in Great Torrington in 2019

The Pannier Market in Great Torrington in Devon is a Victorian pannier market of 12 small indoor shops - six either side of a narrow cobbled lane built in 1842 and restored in 1999. The Market House building at the front of the complex has been a Grade II* listed building on the Historic England Register since 1951.

== History ==
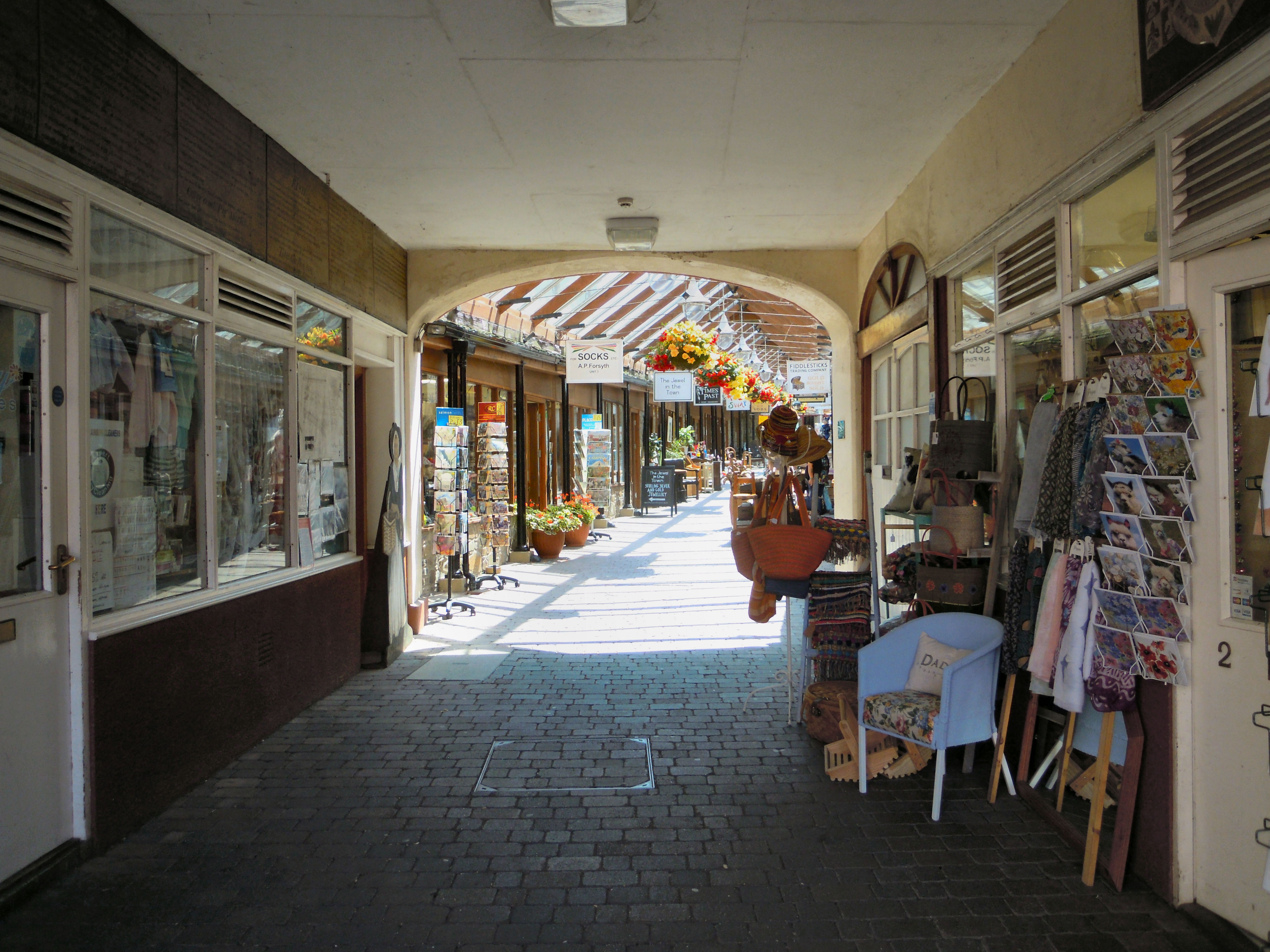
The Pannier Market

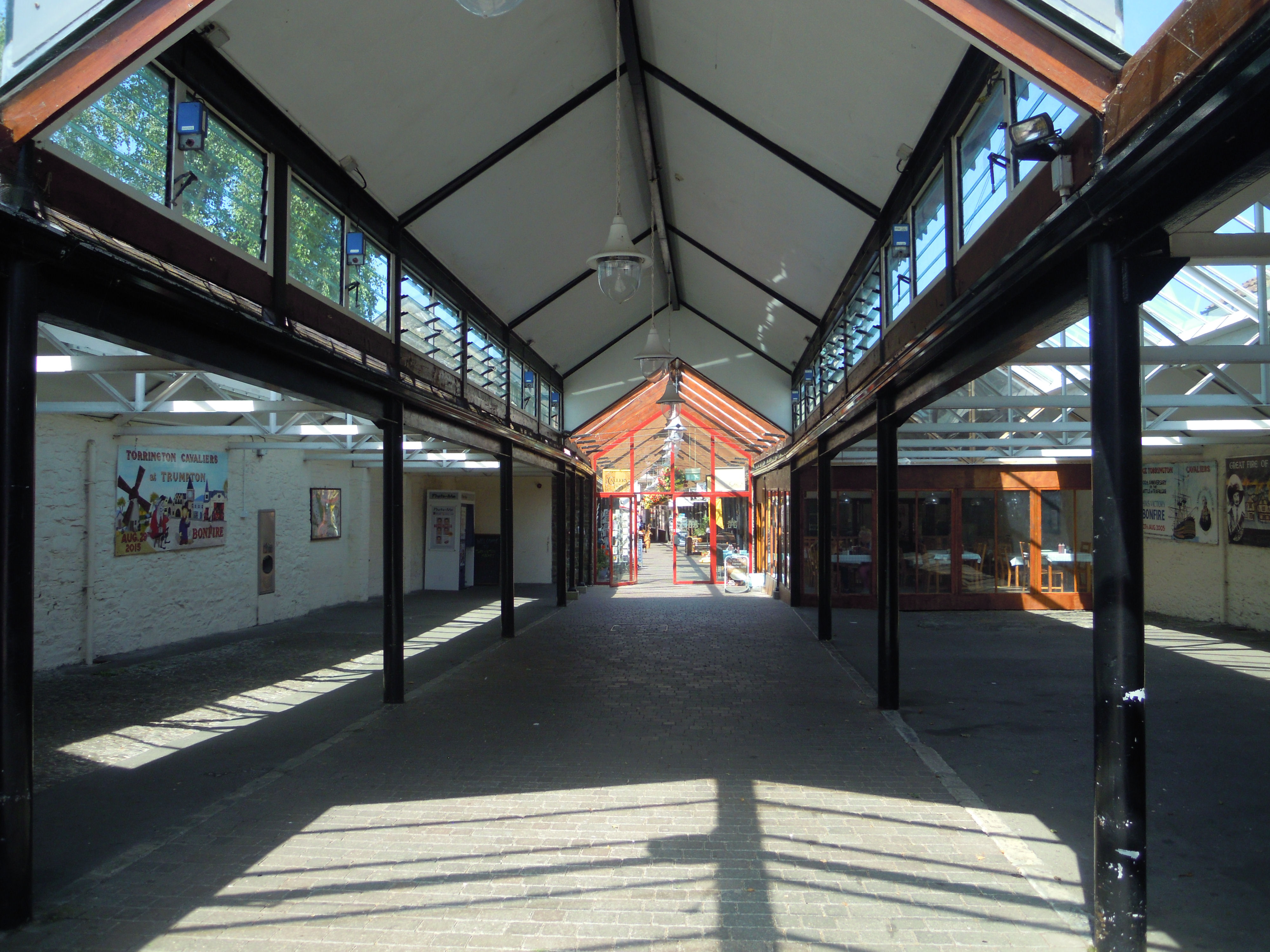
The Market Hall

Before 1842 market traders in Great Torrington had to set up their stalls in the streets while the butchers sold their meat in an open courtyard at the rear of the town hall known as 'the shambles'. To the left of the entrance can be seen the original table of tolls and rent. In 1842, £2,990 was raised and the present Market House and market were built where fresh farm produce, meat and fish could be sold. On its South Street frontage a hall was added with a gallery above the arch leading to the pannier market and market hall, reached by a narrow cobbled lane flanked by 12 small shops used as the pannier market. The hall was available for lectures and exhibitions and balls and concerts were also held here. In 1936 the hall became the public library until it relocated to its present site. The iron gates at the entrance to the market were made by a local blacksmith, Richard Baker. In 1892 the market hall roof was glazed.

The original Victorian building gradually fell into a state of disrepair during the first half of the 20th century and the glass roof becoming dangerous was eventually dismantled in 1948.

In 1996 Great Torrington was awarded £1,000,000 under the government's Rural Challenge scheme to help develop rural areas. In October 1999 the entire Market House building was refurbished and redeveloped as part of the Genesis Project, co-ordinated by the Great Torrington and District Community Development Trust which now manages the building with funding provided by various other agencies. The refurbishment included the Castle Hill Hotel and the setting up of the Great Torrington Heritage Museum beside the market building, tourist information centre, a modernised library and an IT centre. The Victorian pannier market was reconstructed with new fronts to the shop units and a new glass roof fitted to the market hall.

== Market House ==
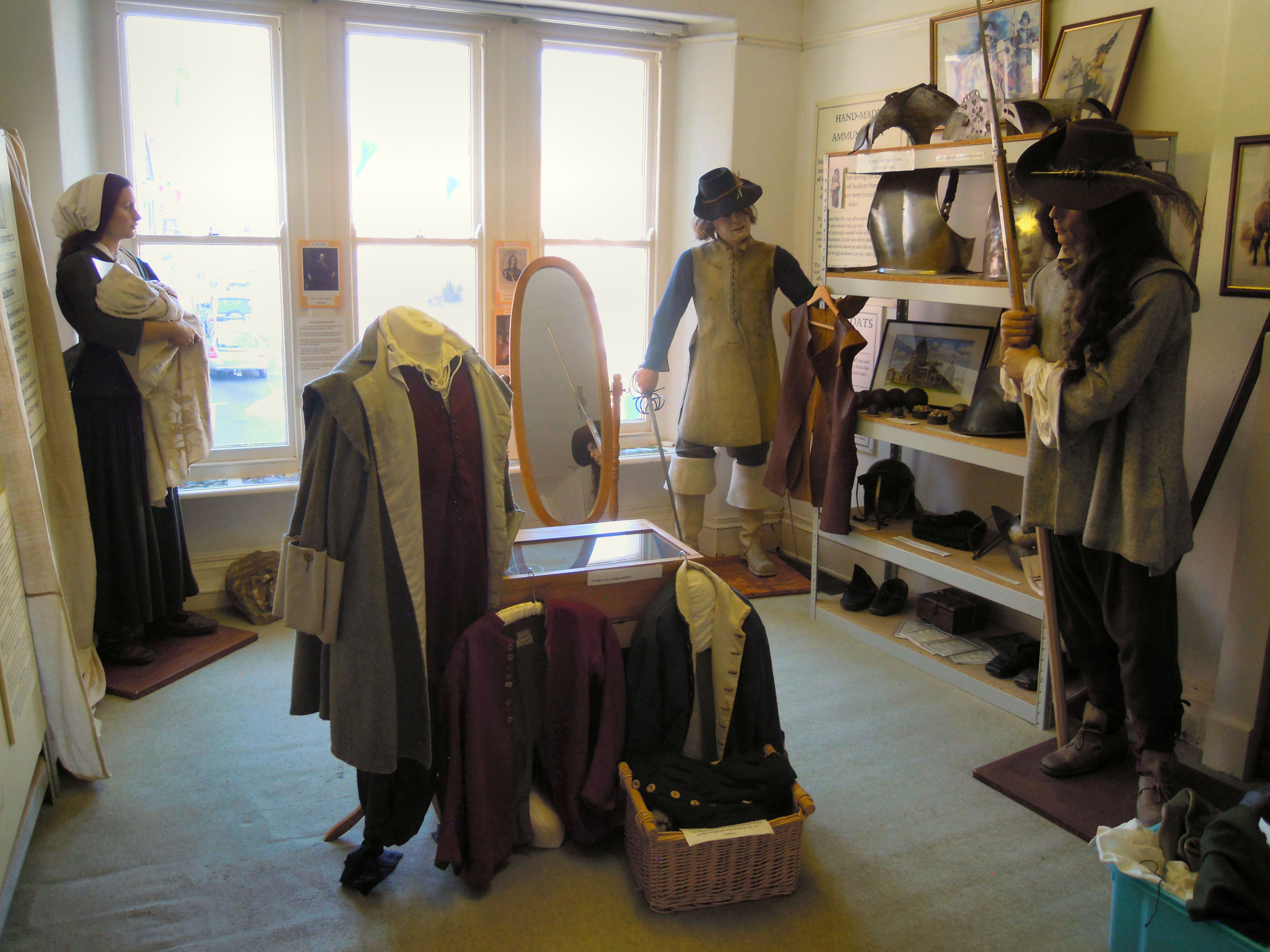
Display on the First English Civil War in the Market House

The Grade II* listed Market House fronts on to South Street with the pannier market and market hall behind it via a narrow cobbled lane. The two-storey structure has a stucco front with rusticated openings while in the central arch are ornamental iron gates made by a local blacksmith, Richard Baker. The upper storey has Ionic pilasters while above is a bell-cot with four Tuscan columns supporting a small dome.

Today the Market House is the location for the Great Torrington Heritage Museum and Archive including a room dedicated to the English Civil War and the battle at Torrington in 1646. Other displays include examples of gloving, blacksmithing, agriculture, printing and the Home Front during World War II. Also on view are a number of items from the museum's costume collection. The museum is run by volunteers and is open: Mondays 10:30 - 16:00; Tuesdays 10:30 - 16:00; Wednesdays 10:30 - 13:00; Thursdays 10:30 - 16:00; Fridays 10:30 - 13:00 and Saturdays 10:30 - 13:00. Entry is free.

== Services ==
The building is open from 07:00 to 19:00 seven days a week. In the approach to the market hall are 12 small retail units/craft workshops (the pannier market) and a café which are open Monday to Saturday from 10.00 am to 4.00 pm. The large market hall at the rear of the building holds the weekly General Market with stalls on Thursdays, Fridays and Saturdays. There is a bric-à-brac and collectables market on Fridays. The market hall is available for hire.

== See also ==
- Pannier Market, Barnstaple
- Pannier Market, Bideford
- Pannier Market, South Molton
