= Pannier Market, Bideford =

Historic market in North Devon, England

Coordinates: 51.0169°N 4.2072°W

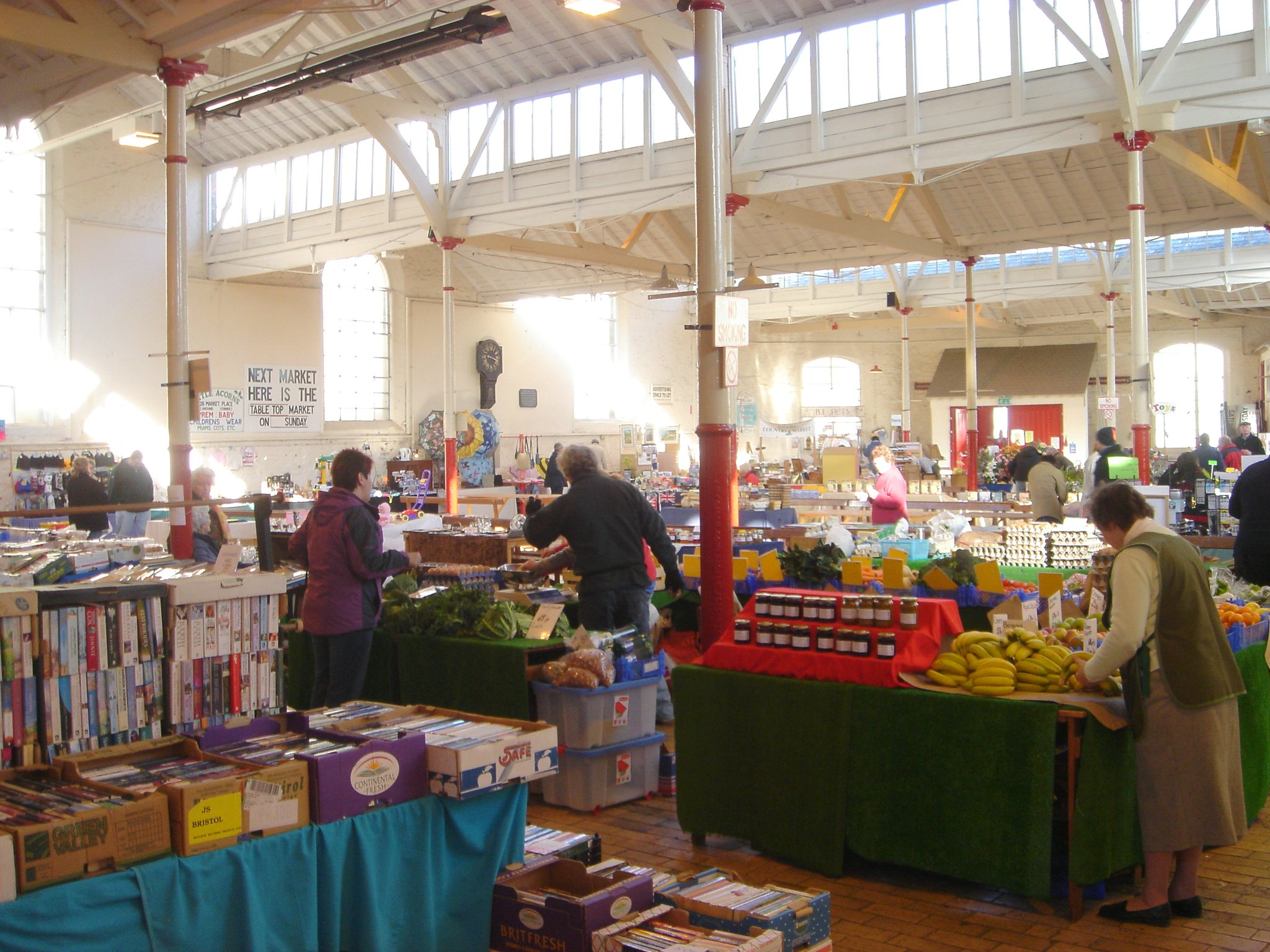
- Entrance to the Pannier Market
- Interactive map of the Pannier Market, Bideford area

General information
- Architectural style: Victorian
- Completed: 1884
- Cost: £4,200
- Client: Bideford Town Council
- Owner: Bideford Town Council

Technical details
- Material: Roughly-coursed stone rubble, red and cream brick, red terracotta, limestone, glass and iron roof

Design and construction
- Architect: J. Chudley

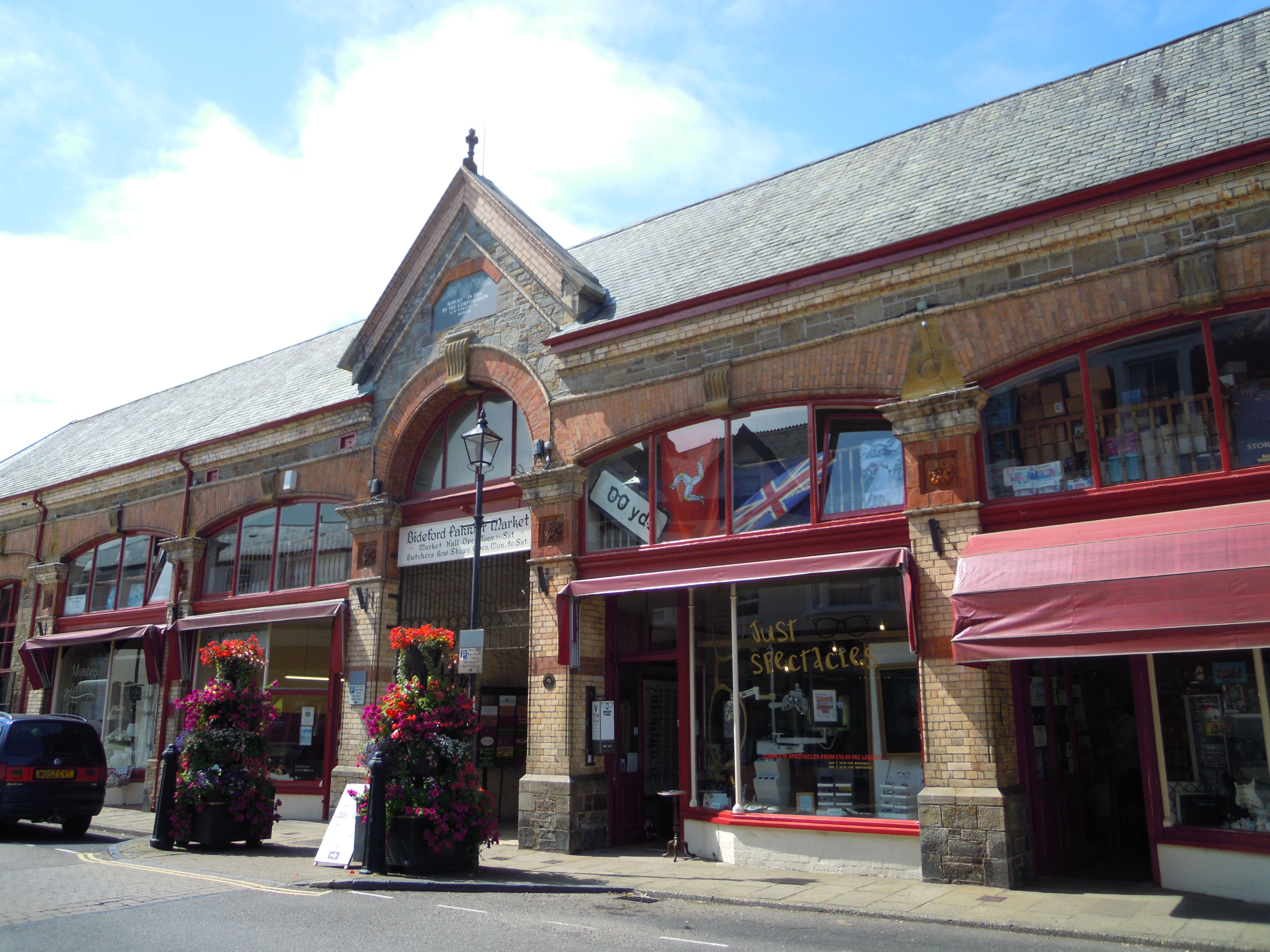
Entrance to the Pannier Market in Bideford

The Pannier Market in Bideford in North Devon is a large covered Victorian pannier market together with the Butcher's Row of small artisan stalls running along the lower level of the Market. There has been a market on the site since 1675. Since 1989 it has been a Grade II listed building on the register of Historic England.

== History ==
=== Origins ===
The Pannier Market from Honestone Street

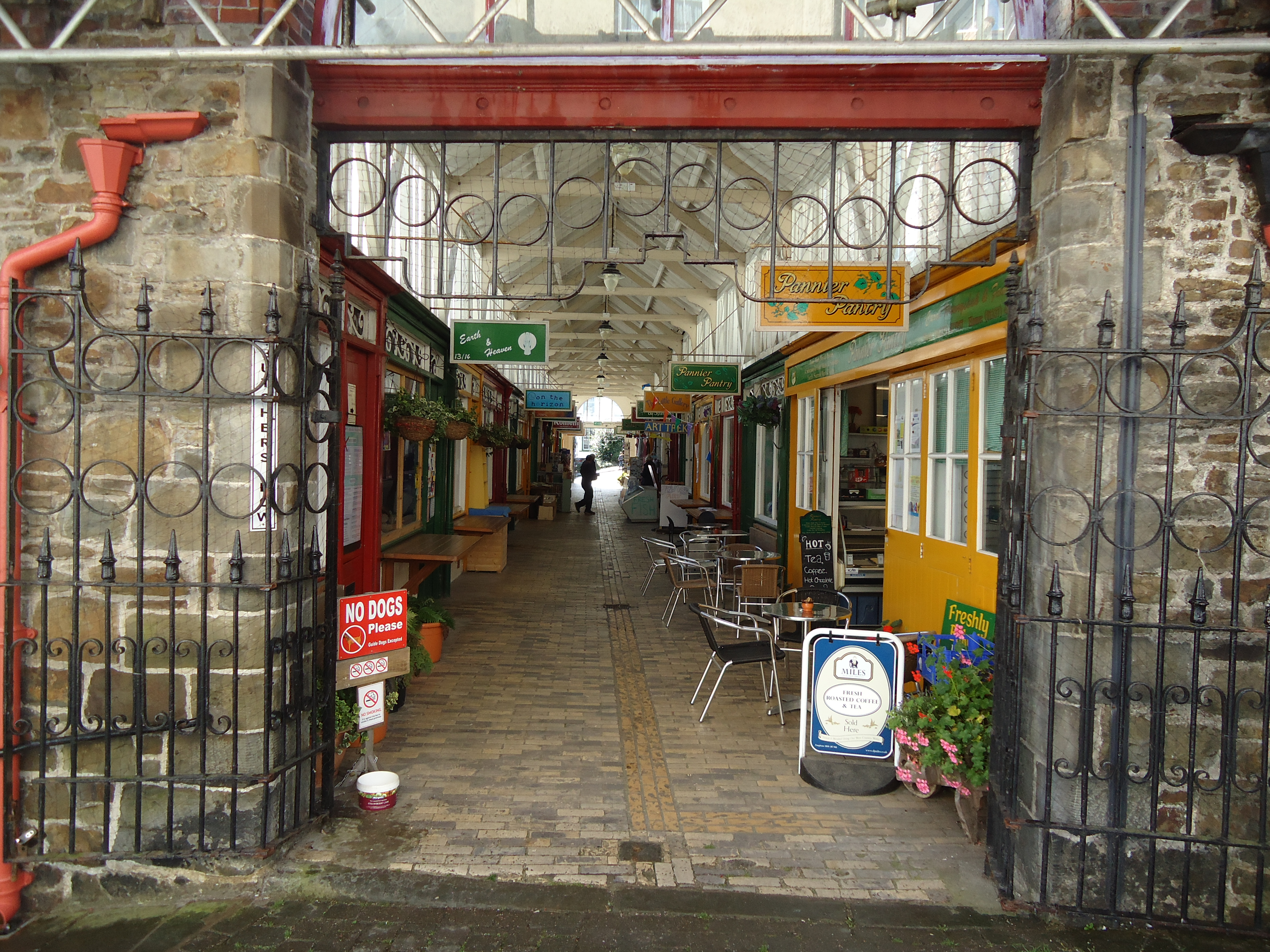
An Entrance to Butcher's Row in Bideford Pannier Market.

Inside the Market Hall in 1907

Bideford's market traces its origins to 1204 when Sir Richard Grenville, Lord of the Manor of Bideford, refers to it in a Charter setting out the rights of local people. These rights were confirmed in a Charter of 1272 granted by Henry III at which time the Medieval market was located at the bottom of the present High Street, by the river. These rights were renewed when Bideford received its Charter of Incorporation in 1573 which also established a town council and a Mayor of Bideford.

=== The Market moves ===
In 1675 the council moved the market from the High Street to its present site, it then being a collection of stalls with a 'shambles' or butcher's market in one section with the town stocks also bring present.

In 1750 the Manor of Bideford including the market rights passed to the hands of the Cleveland Family of nearby Tapeley Park in Instow. A glimpse of the market at that time is presented by Bideford's first historian, John Watkins, who wrote "It is very well supplied with all kinds of provisions, and at a moderate rate." By the 19th-century market traders were demanding better conditions and in 1825 the market was roofed over for the first time. In 1861 a tourist wrote "The whole building buzzed with a healthy, bustling good humoured crowd of women, and outside were the men, looking after the horse and pony market". Sheep were confined in pens below Victoria Terrace with larger animals tied to hooks once to be found in the wall below the houses.

=== Present Pannier Market ===
In 1881 Bideford Town Council purchased the manorial rights for the market from the Cleveland Family who had refused to pay for further repairs and improvements, and between 1883 and 1884 the Council demolished the old structure and built a new market to a design by Newton Abbot-based architect J. Chudley. Built of roughly-coursed stone rubble with dressings of red and cream brick, red terracotta and limestone, the Pannier Market in Bideford opened on 15 April 1884 having been built at a cost of £4,200. In use also as a corn exchange, market days were Tuesdays and Saturdays and were visited by local people and traders from the rural villages around Bideford. Like its sister market at nearby Barnstaple, the building has a glass and timber roof on iron columns.

During the opening celebrations the area around the Pannier Market was decorated with floral garlands while there was a peal of church bells from nearby St Mary's church, a gun salute and a procession with the Mayor of Bideford. A celebratory concert was held as well as a formal dinner for 200 local dignitaries, according to a report in the North Devon Gazette. Later in the week a tea party for 2,000 local children was held.

In 1919 900 recently demobilised servicemen sat down to a celebration dinner in the Market Hall while in 1929 a speech delivered by David Lloyd George in Devonport was relayed to an audience of 4,000 people in the hall. During times of hardship a soup kitchen operated in the hall and in 1942 a British Restaurant offering cheap meals to war workers was opened in the South West corner.

The market passed out of the hands of Bideford Town Council in 1974 when Torridge District Council took over all that body's assets. Moves to privatise the market in the 1980s were defeated and in 1991 Bideford Town Council regained control when it leased the market back.

== Butcher's Row ==
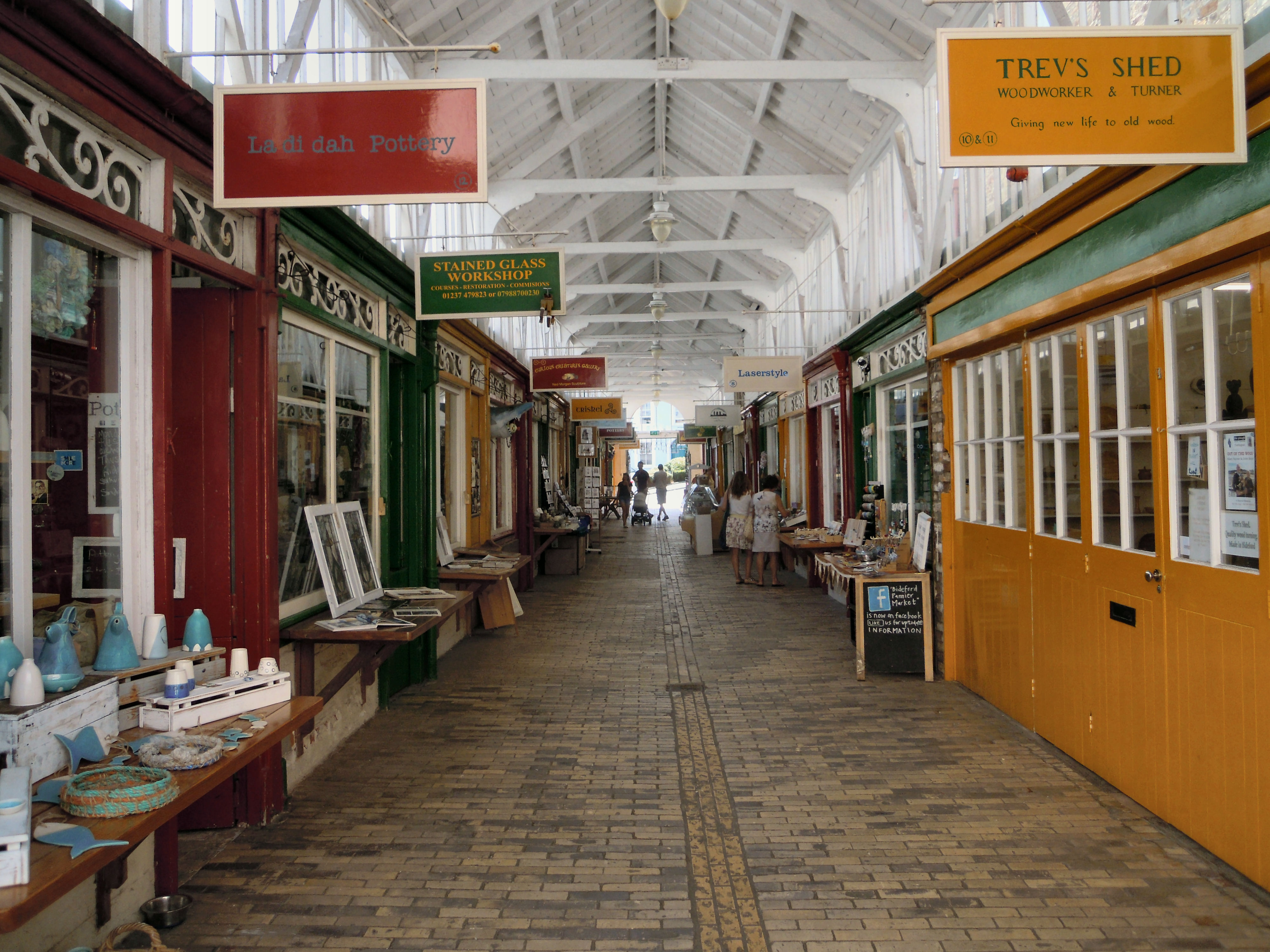
Butcher's Row

Butcher's Row is a covered row of 12 small shops devoted to artisan craftspeople but which originally were used by butchers and fishmongers and in some meat hooks are still in situ. Crafts available here include stained glass, hand-crafted jewellery and metal sculptures as well as wood sculptures carved by former Roobarb and Custard animator John Butler and slipware jugs by the notable Devon potter Harry Juniper, both of whom trained at Bideford Art School. In some of the shops you can watch as the craftspeople create their wares.

Butcher's Row is open Mondays to Saturdays throughout the year.

== Market Hall ==
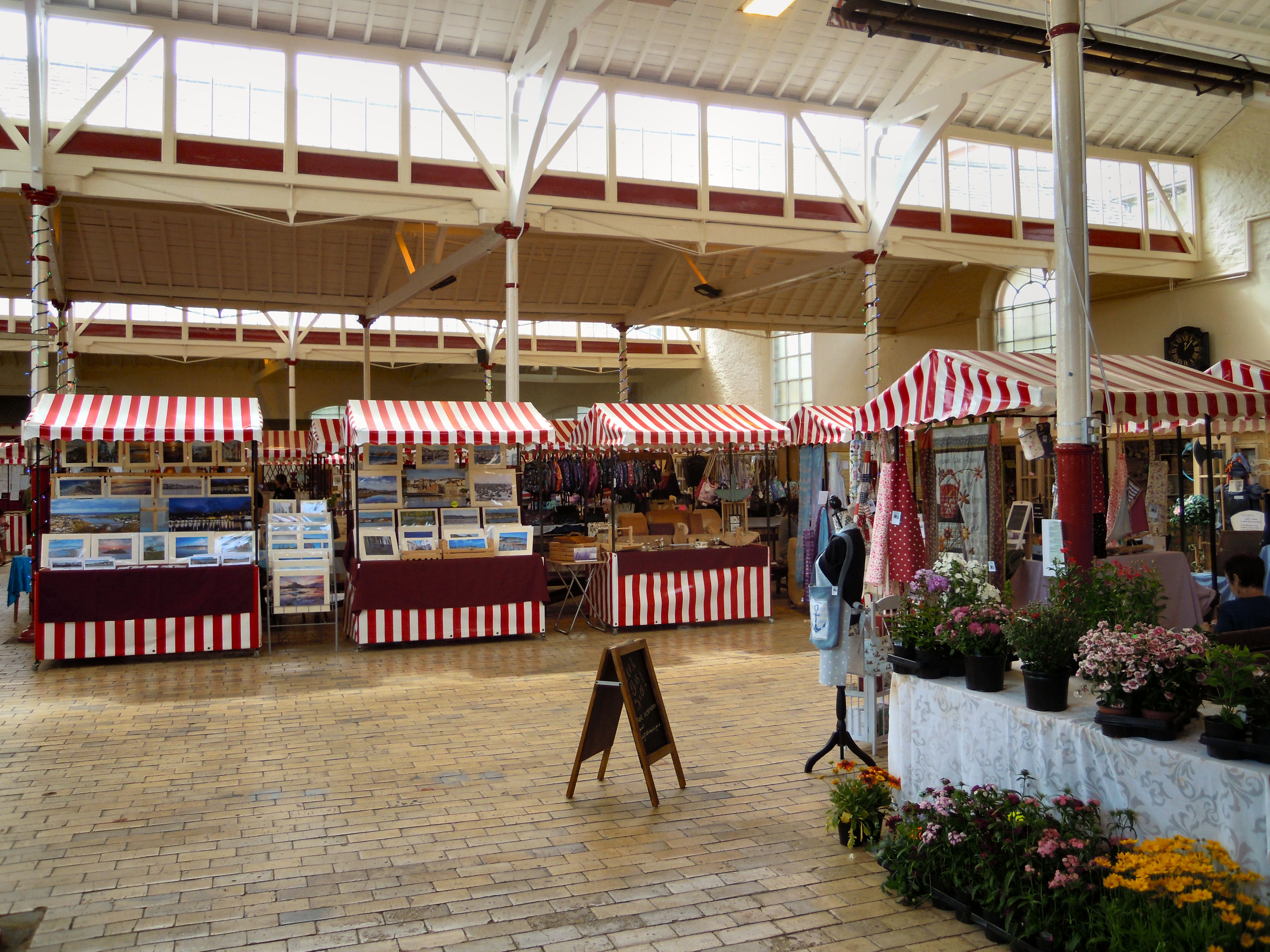
The Market Hall

The 1,000 square-metre covered market hall (described in 1889 as occupying '10,500 superficial feet') is reached from an external entrance on Honestone Street or from steps up from Butcher's Row. The Market Hall consist of five roof-spans carried on hollow iron columns with moulded caps and bases. These columns were moulded with the inscriptions 'Tardrew & Sons. Ironmongers & Iron Founders. Bideford. 1883' and 'J. H. Foaden. Contractor. Ashburton'. The hall has a floor of cream brick.

The covered Market Hall is undergoing extensive refurbishment until April 2027. There are no markets or shops within the Market Hall. A café serves a range of food and beverages.

== Market Place ==
Market Place is a row of seven shops that flanks the entrance to the Market and Butcher's Row on Grenville Street and during the Victorian era the fish market and corn exchange seem to have been at either end. Today these shops retain their original Victorian frontage with large windows and sell a wide range of goods ranging from fishing tackle to collectables and are open six days a week.

== See also ==
- Pannier Market, Barnstaple
- Pannier Market, Torrington
- Pannier Market, South Molton
