= Guildhall, Barnstaple =

Guildhall in Devon, England

Barnstaple Guildhall
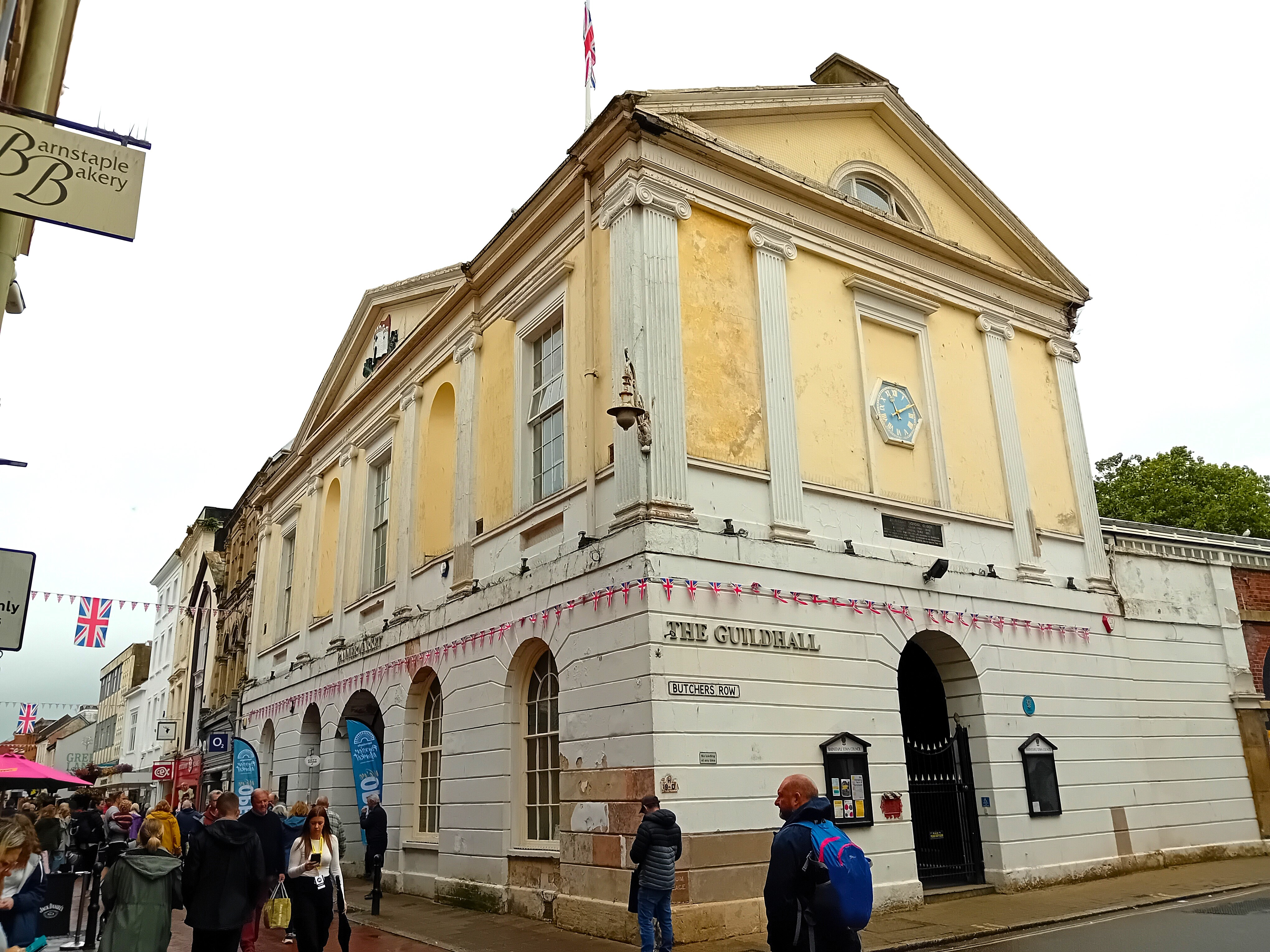
- The Guildhall and Pannier Market in Barnstaple in 2023

- Location within Devon
- 51.0803°N 4.0601°W
- Location: Barnstaple, Devon

History
- Built: 1828

Site notes
- Architect: Thomas Lee
- Architectural style: Neo-classical style

Listed Building – Grade II*
- Designated: 19 January 1951
- Reference no.: 1385188

The Guildhall in Barnstaple in Devon in the United Kingdom is the Guildhall for the town and was completed in 1828, replacing an earlier Guildhall. Beneath and behind the Guildhall is the Pannier Market; completed in 1855, the building has been a Grade II* listed building since 19 January 1951.

== The Guildhall ==
The Guildhall is located on Barnstaple's High Street, on the corner with Butchers' Row. Originally, a meat market was on the present site with a corn market above made up of 34 stalls running from the High Street to Anchor Lane, about halfway down the length of the present Pannier Market. The people of Barnstaple were unwilling to extend the market further at this time as they were concerned at the high cost required to buy the site and feared that a Pannier Market in the town would not be a success. Meanwhile, vegetables and dairy goods continued to be sold from panniers outside on either side of the High Street. Eventually it was decided to build a Guildhall on the High Street end of the meat market. Designed by Thomas Lee in the neo-classical style in 1826 and completed in 1828, the smoothly rusticated ground floor supports an upper floor with Ionic pilasters and pediment, modest in scale and appearance.

The High Street façade has five arches with the central bay wider than the others. The side wall facing Butchers' Row is probably by local architect R.D. Gould and dates to 1855. While the Guildhall is built of solid and rendered walls, portions exposed internally during works in 1991 suggest that the front wall is built of red brick while the right side wall (which is possibly a pre-1826 party wall) is built of stone rubble. The roof is slated while the rendered chimney has a moulded cornice on its right gable-end. A cupola at the apex of the roof, which is topped by an 'ornate weather-vane', contains a bell (from the old butchers' market) dating from 1714; (it was restored to use in 2024).

In the blind window facing Butchers' Row is an octagonal clock face originally on the Northgate from about 1760 to its demolition in 1842 when it was removed to the Bluecoat School where it remained from 1842 to 1971 until it was moved to its present position in 1982. To the left of the doorway below is the Mayor's poor box constructed of iron and dated to 1895.

== The Main Chamber ==
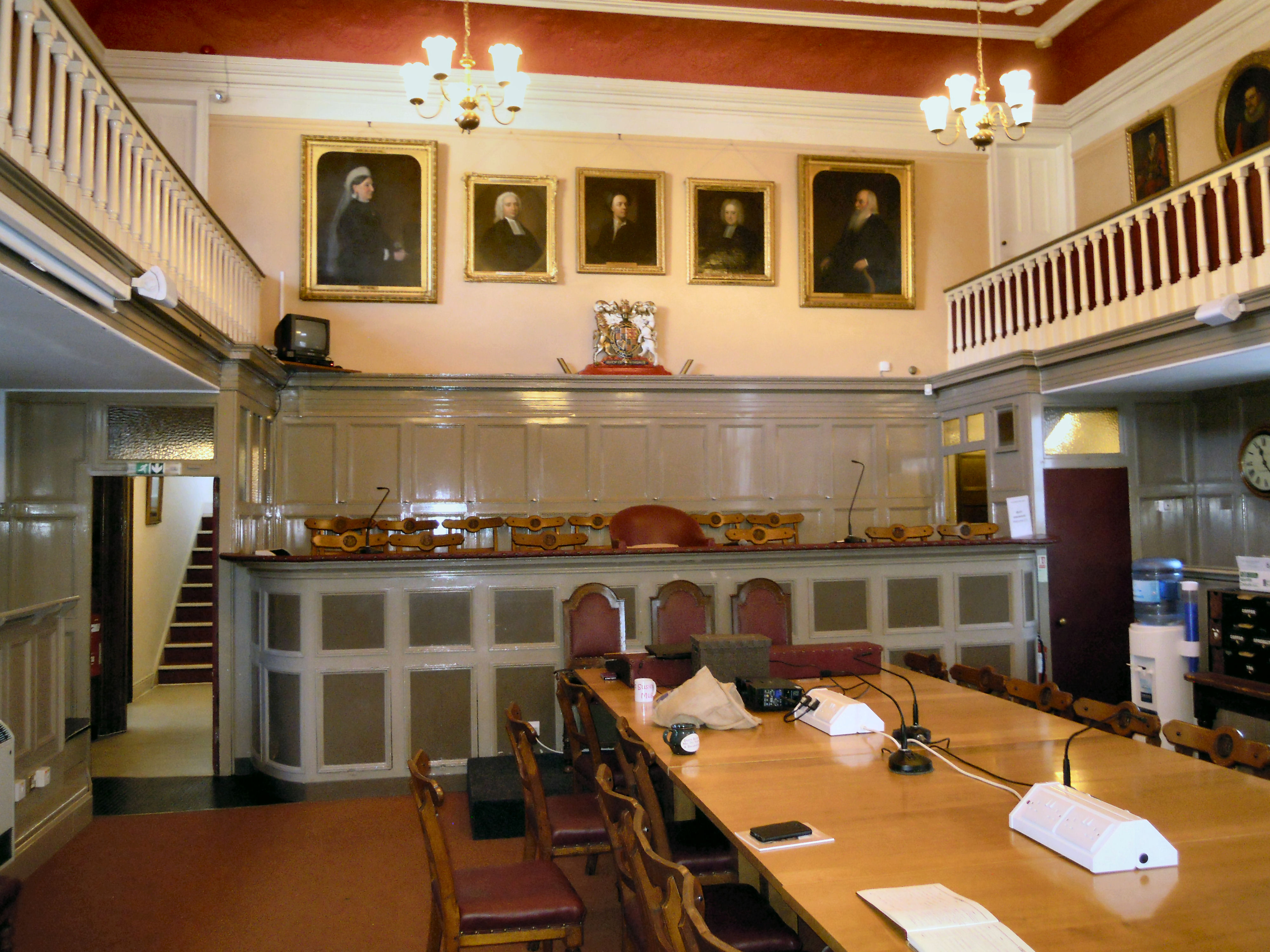
View of the Chamber looking South

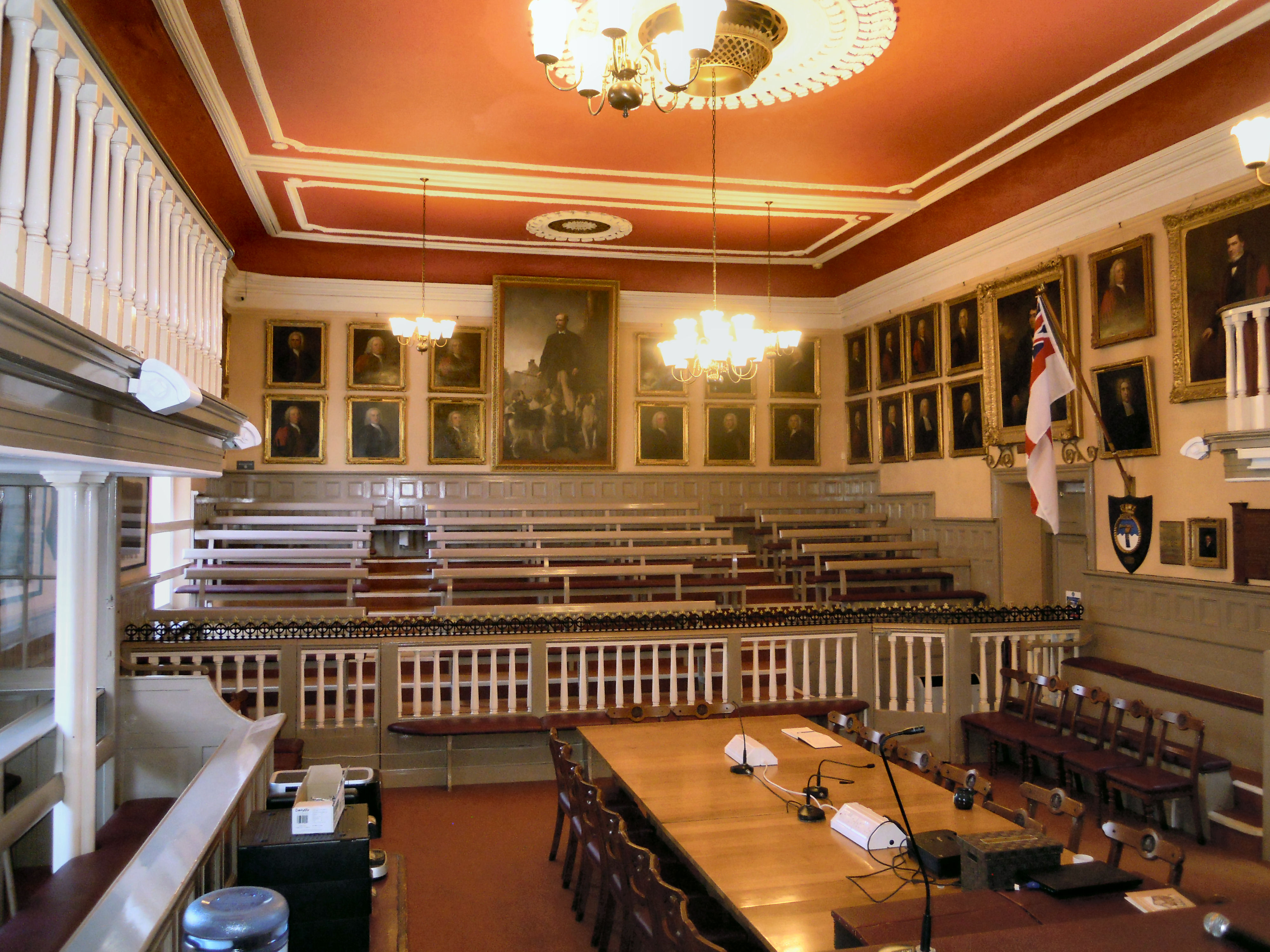
The Chamber looking North

The Chamber still retains may of its features from the time it served as a courtroom having a bench for the Justices' at its South side together with similar side-benches and two square mobile boxes on rollers for the accused and witnesses. Above the side benches are short galleries for ladies and the grand jury while at the North side is located tiered seating for the general public. In front of the bench is a large table for the clerk and lawyers.

The Chamber was the meeting place of the historic Borough of Barnstaple. The council moved its main offices to Castle House in the grounds of Barnstaple Castle in 1927. A new civic centre on North Walk was built in 1969 which included council offices, a council chamber and a courthouse, after which the chamber at the Guildhall was only used for occasional ceremonial council meetings. The Chamber continues to serve as the meeting room for Barnstaple Town Council and here take place the annual Mayor Making Ceremony and the Fair Proclamation.

On the walls of the Chamber are displayed portraits of former Mayors of Barnstaple and various other local dignitaries including local benefactor William Frederick Rock and Barnstaple-born John Gay, author of The Beggar's Opera. Some of these were painted by the noted artist Thomas Hudson and a number were restored with funding from the National Lottery.

== The Dodderidge Room ==
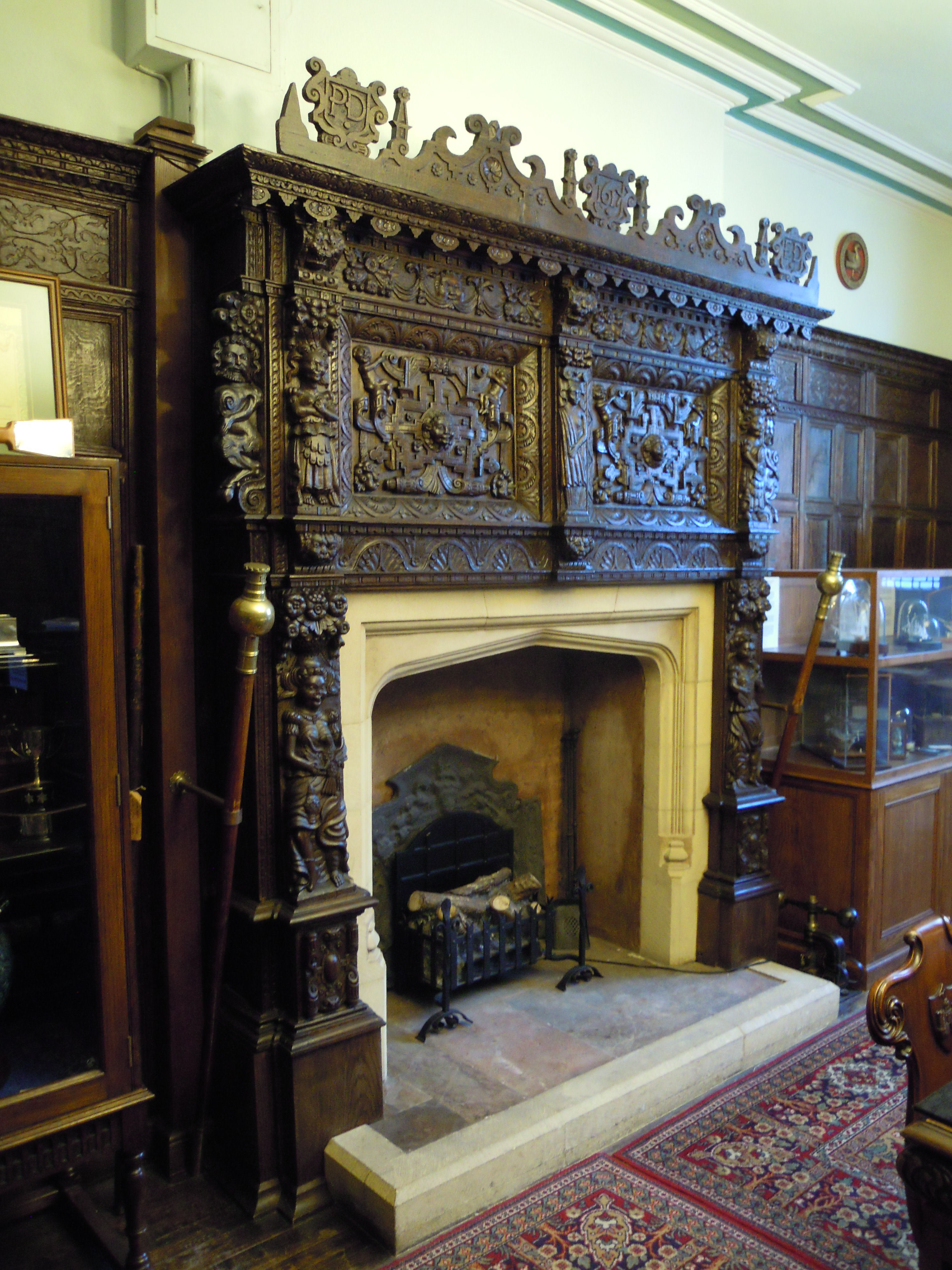
The ornately carved fireplace in the panelled Dodderidge Room

The Dodderidge Room displays the town's collection of silver and other relics connected with the history of Barnstaple.

The beautiful carved fireplace is from the former Dodderidge House in Cross Street in Barnstaple that belonged to wealthy local merchant, ship-owner and three times Member of Parliament for Barnstaple in 1621, 1624 and 1625, Pentecost Dodderidge, after whom the room is named. The house was demolished in 1910 following which the fireplace was moved to a Marist Convent in the town. In 1949 the fireplace and panelling in the room were given to the Guildhall by Alderman John Smale. The top feature on the fireplace was carved locally and dates from 1617 and displays the initials PD and ED; PD for Pentecost Dodderidge himself and ED for his wife, Elizabeth, whom he married in 1599. The main body of the fireplace may have been carved in London or Spain.

The Mayoral chain displayed in a cabinet in the room dates from 1872; this became the chain of the Lady Mayoress in 1911 when a new Mayor's chain was designed and created by Fred Partridge. This new Mayor's chain was funded by donations from the descendants of former Mayors of Barnstaple and the medallions incorporate scenes from the town including the old Guildhall, the Castle Mound and Queen Anne's Walk together with representations of the old town seals and portraits of William Frederick Rock and Pentecost Dodderidge.

The display of silver includes a silver-gilt steeple cup and cover of 1589 given, according to its Latin inscription, by Richard Dodderidge, the father of Penetcost Dodderidge after whom the room is named; silver-gilt steeple cups and covers of similar design dated 1606 and 1620, the latter donated by John Penrose, after whom Penrose's Almshouses in the town are named; two silver-gilt ceremonial maces made by local goldsmith John Peard and dated 1660, replacing earlier ones made in 1425; two silver tankards from 1676 donated by Thomas Horwood, Mayor of Barnstaple in 1653; a punch bowl of 1745 donated by Thomas Benson, Member of Parliament for Barnstaple in 1749; and an 18 inch long oar c1780 signifying an Admiralty warrant for the Mayor in his capacity as Water Bailiff for the Port of Barnstaple. It is inscribed "John Morse Esq., Mayor" on one side, and "Barnstaple Water Bailiff" on the other. The smaller oar signifies the Admiralty warrant of Harbourmaster and would have been worn by Barnstaple's Harbourmaster like a piece of jewellery. Also displayed in this room is a small collection of ship models made by French prisoners-of-war from the Napoleonic Wars.

== The Mayor's Parlour ==
The Mayor's Parlour was created in 1922 out of the former charge-room and cell and today is a working office and meeting space. Displayed here are a number of historic artifacts including an American flag donated by Barnstaple's twin town of Barnstable in Massachusetts.

Displayed on the walls are rolls of honour listing past Mayors of Barnstaple together with a number of pictures and other artifacts connected with Barnstaple's twin towns and the town's links with the Royal Family.

== Pannier Market ==
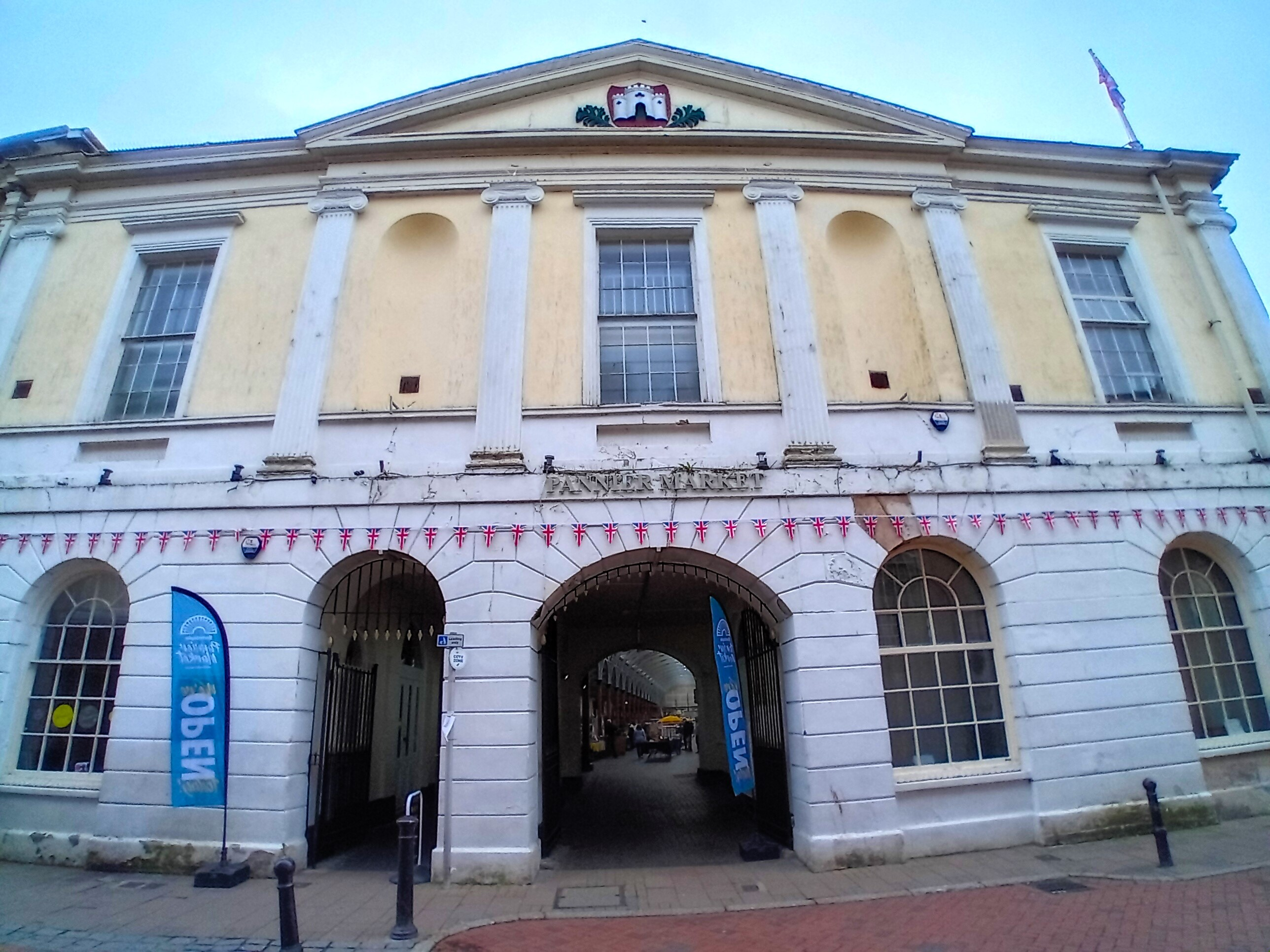
Main elevation of building to High Street, with arch through to Pannier Market.

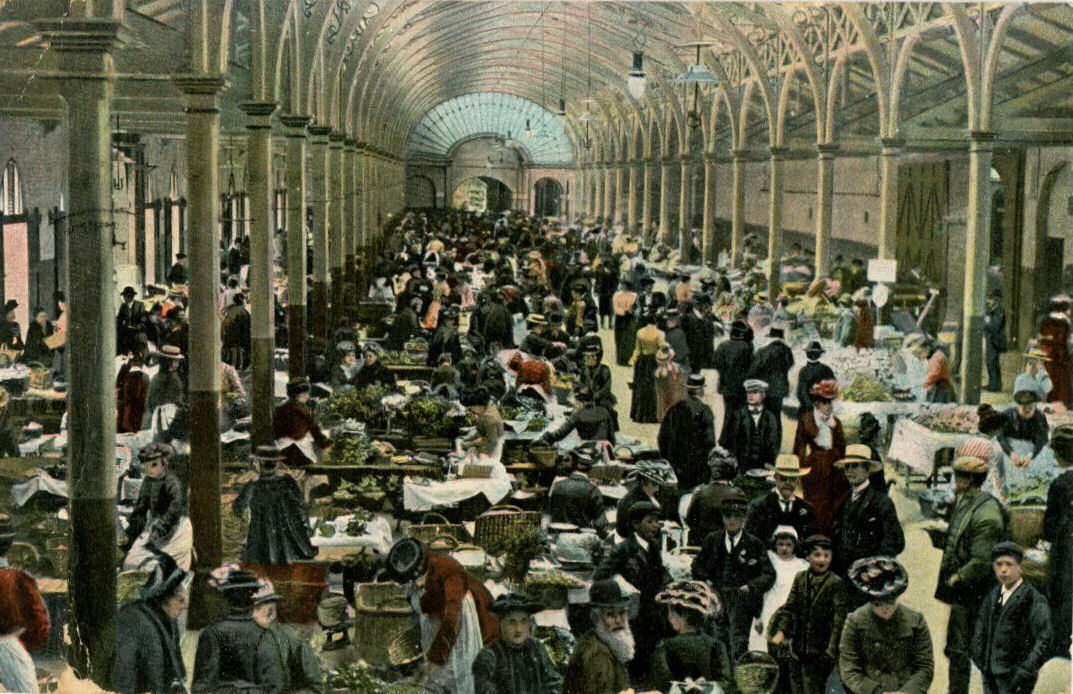
Interior of the Pannier Market in 1907

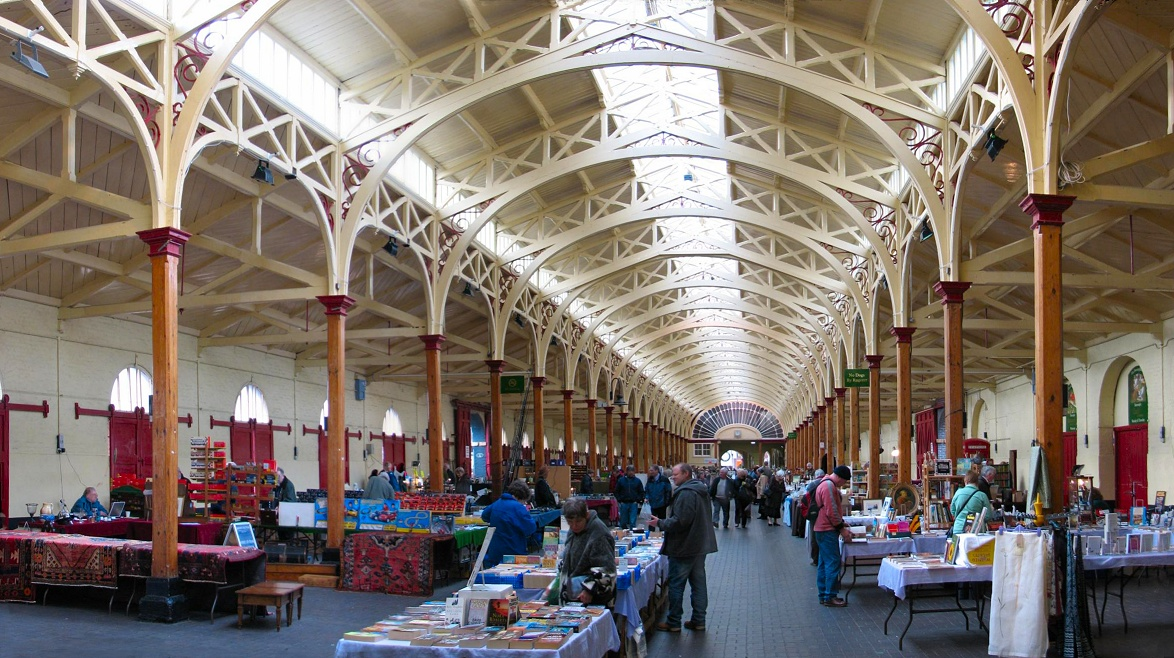
The interior of the Pannier Market at Barnstaple in Devon in 2018

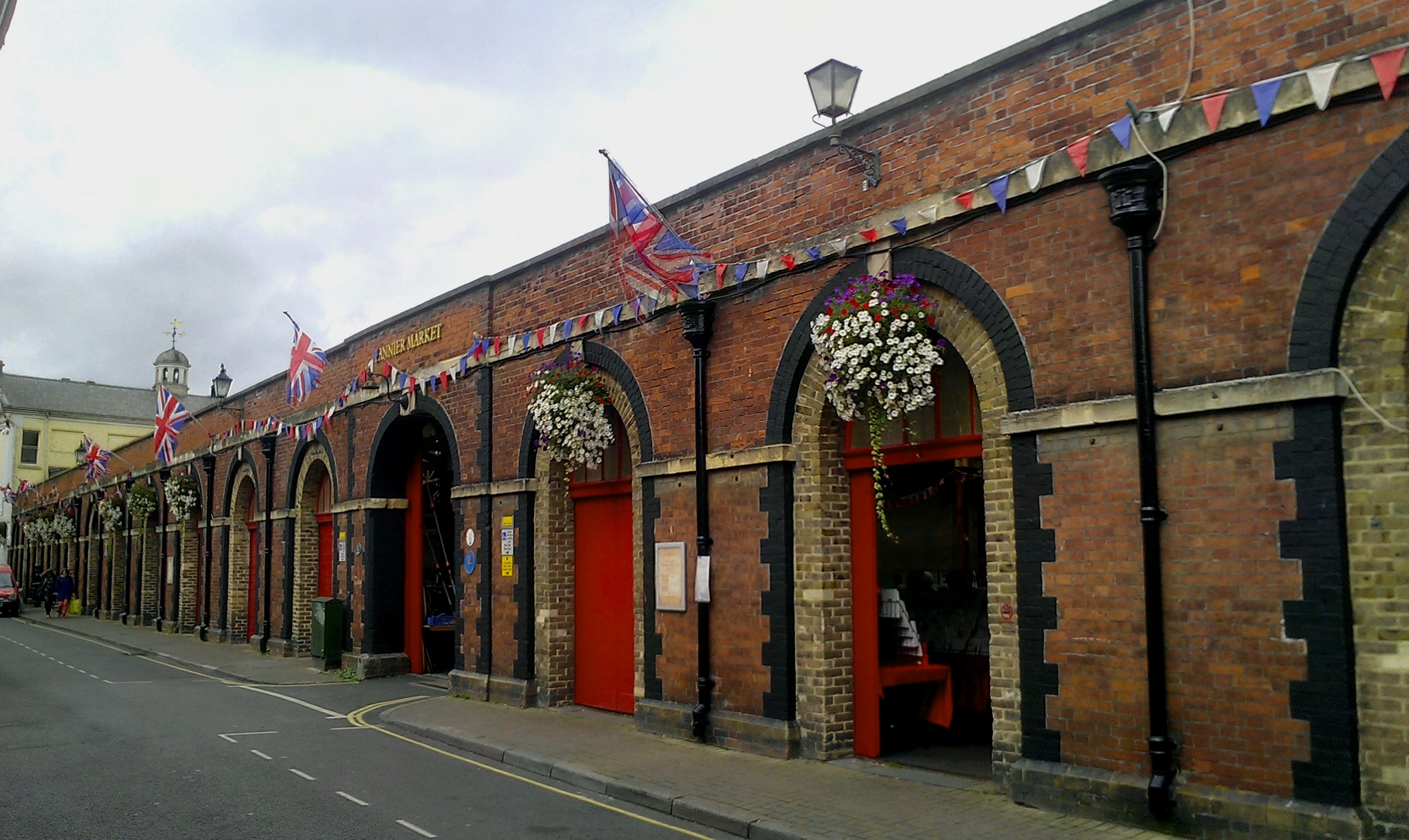
The exterior of the Pannier Market

Barnstaple has been the major market for North Devon since Saxon times. Demands for health regulation of its food market in Victorian times saw the construction in 1855 to 1856 of the town's Pannier Market, originally known as the Vegetable Market and designed by local architect Richard Davey Gould. Like its sister market at nearby Bideford, the building has a high glass and timber roof on iron columns. At 107 yards (98 m) long, it runs the length of Butchers' Row from the High Street to Boutport Street. This new building intended for the selling of vegetables was built on the site of the old meat market, with a Corn Market and Music Hall built shortly after at the Boutport Street end. The butchers who were forced out of their meat market on the site were given new and permanent stalls just across the road in Butchers' Row.

The Pannier Market became a great success and in 1897 local historian W.F. Gardiner wrote: "The result is that Barnstaple can to-day boast of the possession of Markets such as many a county town might well envy. Indeed, Barum's Pannier Market is one of the finest in the Kingdom".

Before the days of supermarkets, the Pannier Market was the best place to obtain daily goods, many supplied by local farmers. Today, the Pannier Market sells a wide range of goods on an almost daily basis, with occasional special days such as wedding fairs.

Built on the other side of the street at the same time as the Pannier Market, Butchers' Row consists of ten shops with pilasters of Bath Stone, and wrought iron supports to an overhanging roof. Only one of the shops remains as a butcher.

Until his death in 2018 local naturalist Johnny Kingdom regularly had a stall at the market from which he sold signed copies of his books, DVDs and photographs of wildlife.

As of early 2020, the local Council's website provided this summary for Pannier Market: "Largely unchanged in over 150 years, Barnstaple's historic Pannier Market has a wide range of stalls, with everything from fresh local produce, flowers and crafts, to prints and pictures, fashion and ... two cafés".

The "Pannier Market, Butchers Row" has been Grade II listed since 1951.

== See also ==
- Pannier Market, Bideford
- Pannier Market, Torrington
- Pannier Market, South Molton

== Sources ==
- Clarke, Peter (1986). Guide to the Barnstaple Guildhall. Aycliffe Press.
