= Plymouth Pannier Market =

Market hall in Plymouth, Devon

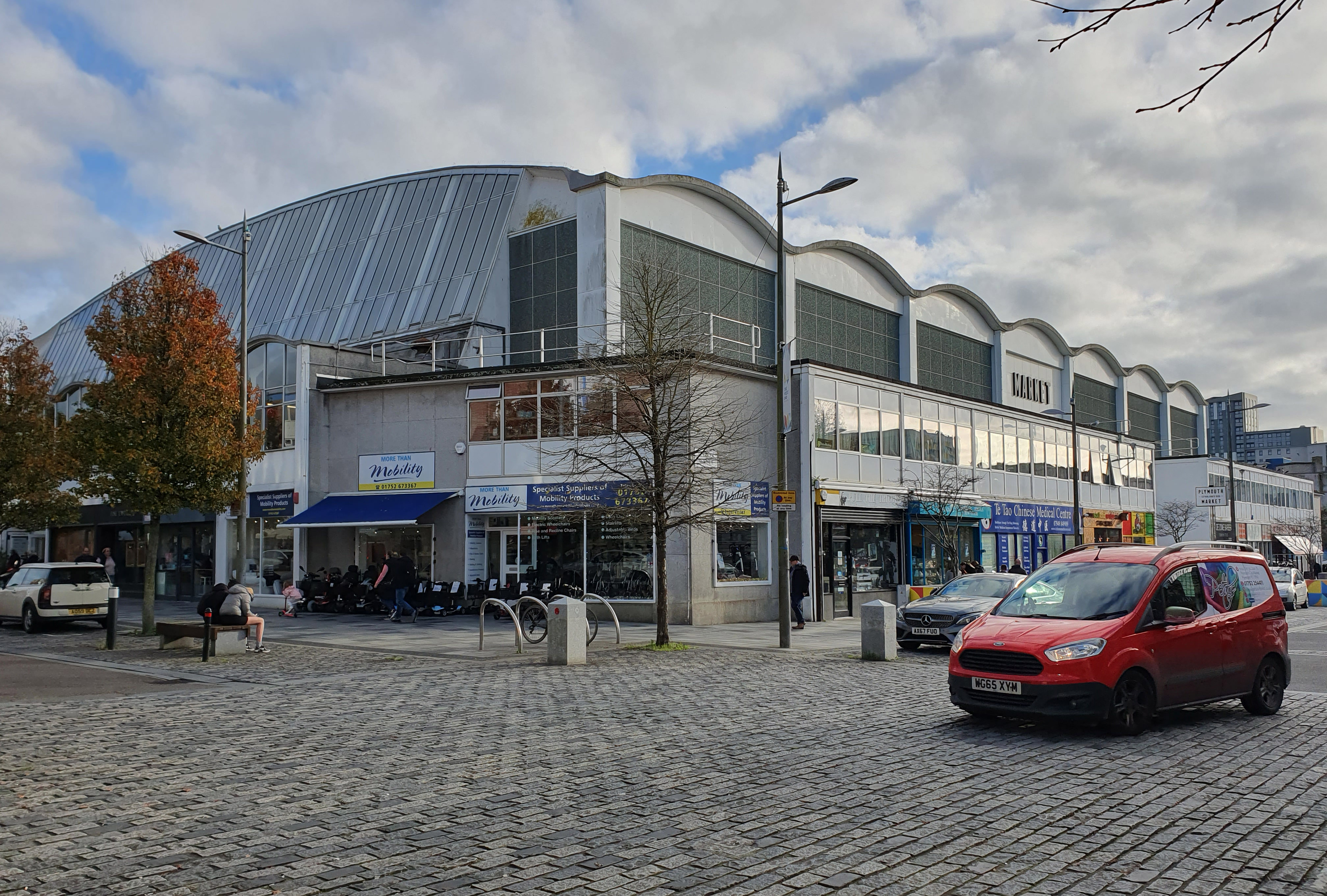
- The Pannier Market from Market Avenue in 2023

- Location within Devon
- 50.37190°N 4.14651°W
- Location: Plymouth, Devon

History
- Built: 1956-1959

Site notes
- Architect(s): Walls & Pearn
- Architectural styles: Modernist; Festival of Britain style

Listed Building – Grade II
- Designated: 25 March 2003
- Reference no.: 1350321

Plymouth Pannier Market, also called Plymouth City Market, is a pannier market in Plymouth, Devon. The building was designed by local architects Walls & Pearn and built in 1959 and 1960. The market was granted Grade II listed status in 2003, and is seen as one of Plymouth's most innovative and important post-war buildings. It gets over a million visitors per year, making it one of the most visited markets in the country.

== Background ==
The Prior of Plympton was first granted a charter to hold markets in Sutton (the ancient name of Plymouth) in 1253. A market building was constructed in 1805 on an "almost unrivalled" site though according to Plymouth architect James Hine, the building itself was "not worthy of a great and civilized community like Plymouth". It was rebuilt in 1853 and modified again in 1891.

Although Historic England says that the original market was bombed in 1941, Elain Harwood and documents from Plymouth City Council say it survived. Harwood writes that the old market closed on 5 September 1959 with a firework display.

== History ==
The project lasted between 1956 and 1959, and its 1959 opening by Lord Mayor Percival Washbourn signalled the completion of the city centre's redevelopment.

In March 2003, the market was listed at grade II by Historic England, noted for "the quality of its interior and technical ingenuity on a large scale".

The market underwent a £3.2 million refurbishment from September 2016 to September 2017, with stalls remaining open for the duration of the works. The refurbishment included restoring the roof, which had deteriorated due to leaks and build-up of guano from seagulls. The completion of works was celebrated with a 'Grand Day Out' event.

Plymouth's strategic masterplan, released in 2017, proposes the market become the focal point of a new 'Market Quarter' within a new market square.

== Design ==
Plymouth's city architect Hector J.W. Stirling was meant to design the market along with a conference centre and an exhibition hall but the level of work meant the market project was outsourced to a local firm. It was instead designed by H.F. Walls and C.H.P. (Paul) Pearn with Ken Bingham being the project architect.

The market has a 40 feet (12 m) high ceiling with seven concrete frames that span 150 feet (46 m). Walls and Pearn worked with Albin Chronowicz, a celebrated structural engineer, to create the building's concrete shell. The roof also had vaults containing north-facing rooflights, which give the interior an even, natural light. Cantilevered flights of stairs at either end of the market lead up to a gallery cafe.

The porches at the main entrances are decorated with murals by sculptor David Weeks.

The building has been described as modernist, Festival of Britain-style, and a rejection of classical composition. It was awarded a Civic Trust Award in 1960.

Alex de Rijke proposed that the market could be used more effectively by the introduction of a mezzanine, creating a balcony level which could be used by cafes and bars.

== Gallery ==
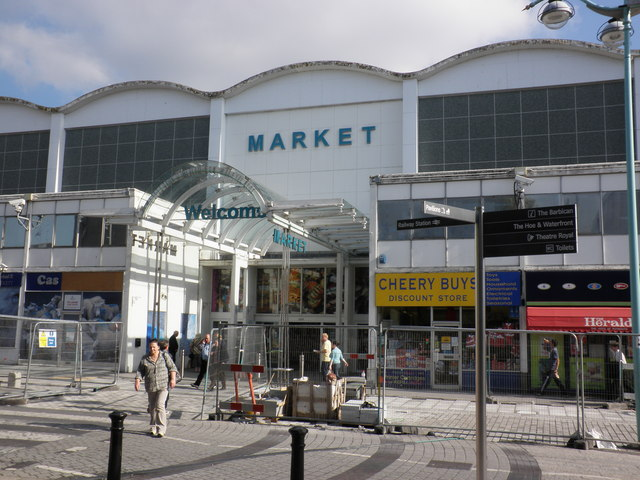
Entrance from Market Avenue in 2009

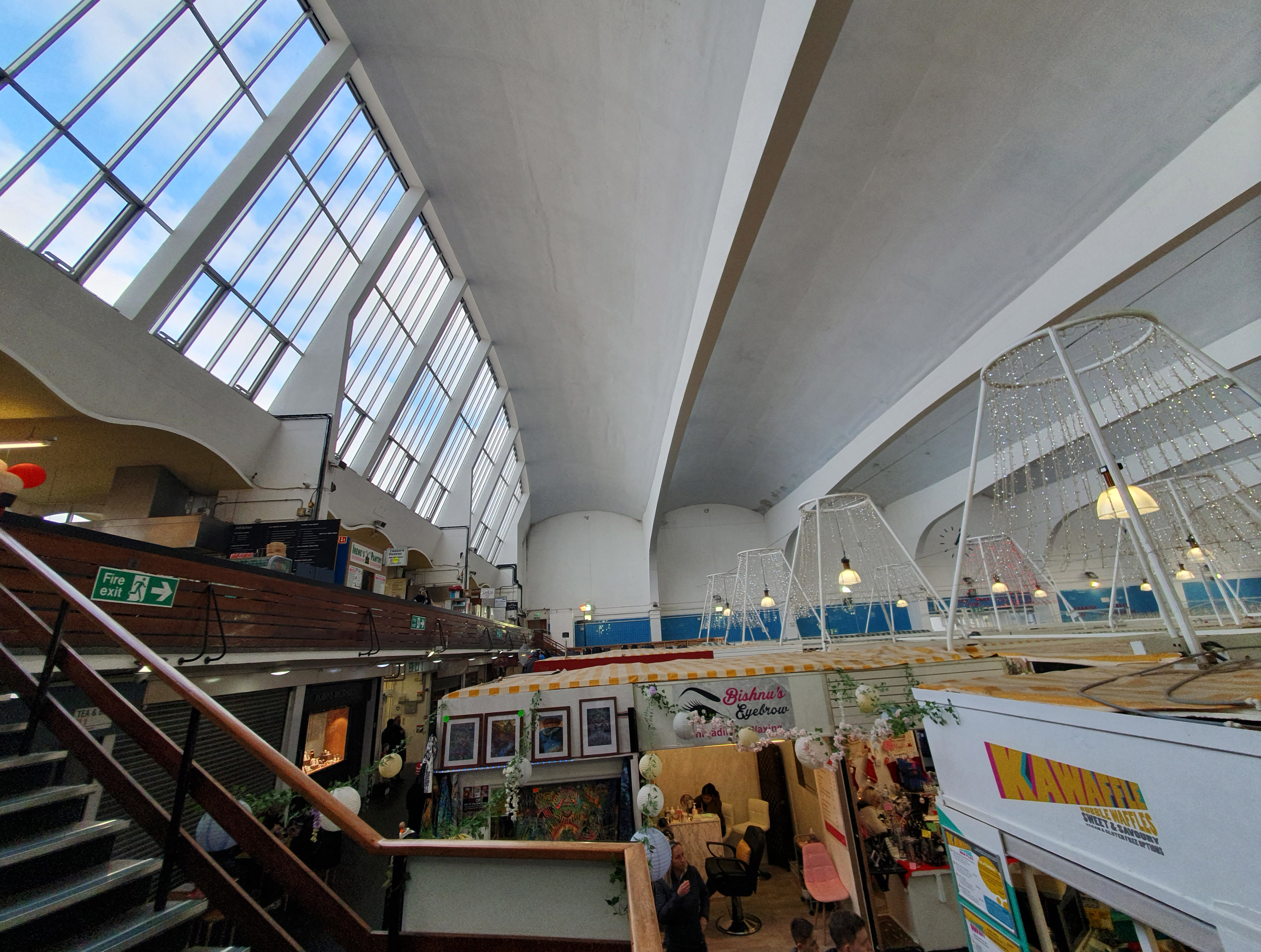
Interior of the market showing ceiling vaults and rooflights

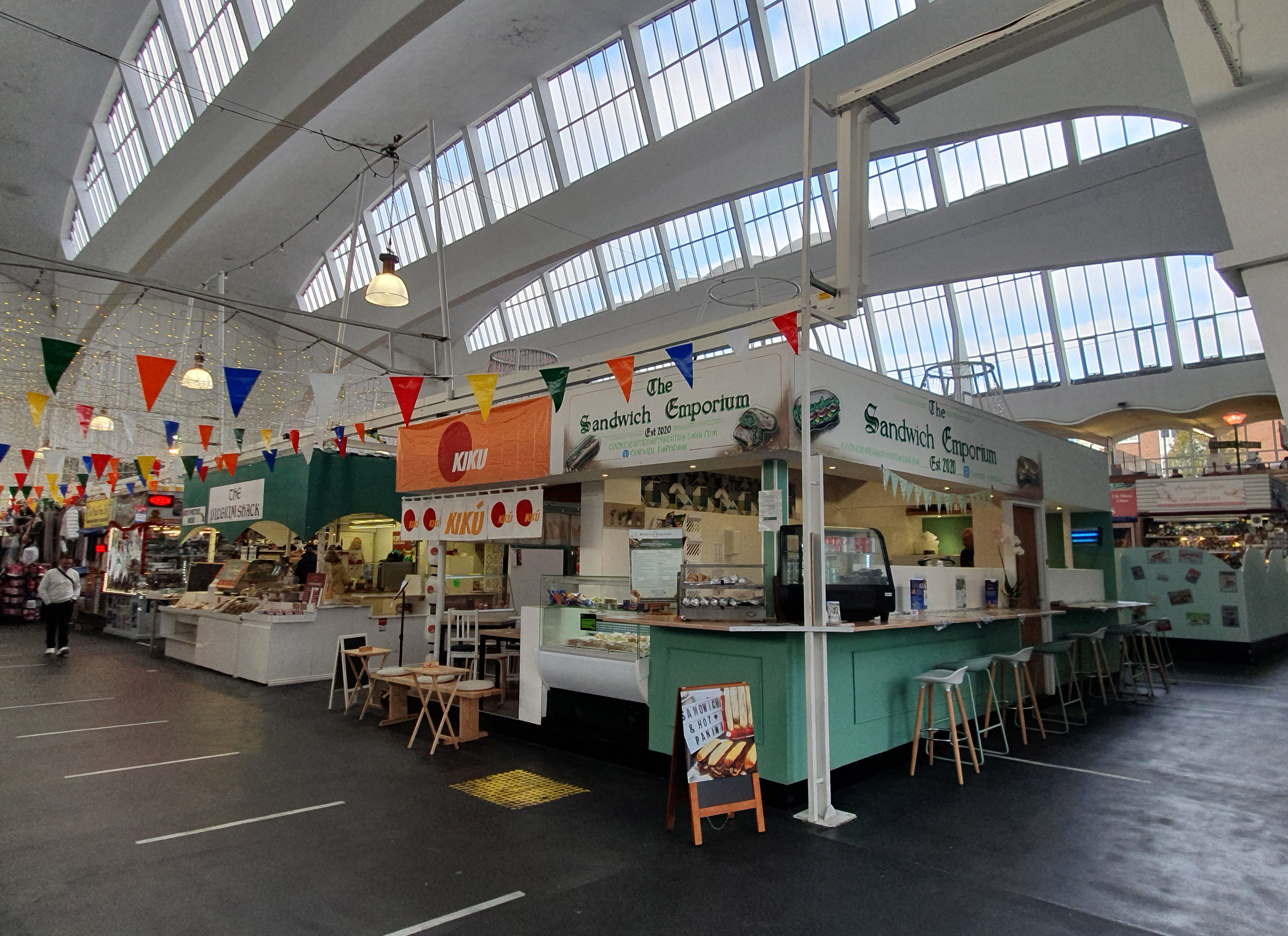
Food stalls inside the market

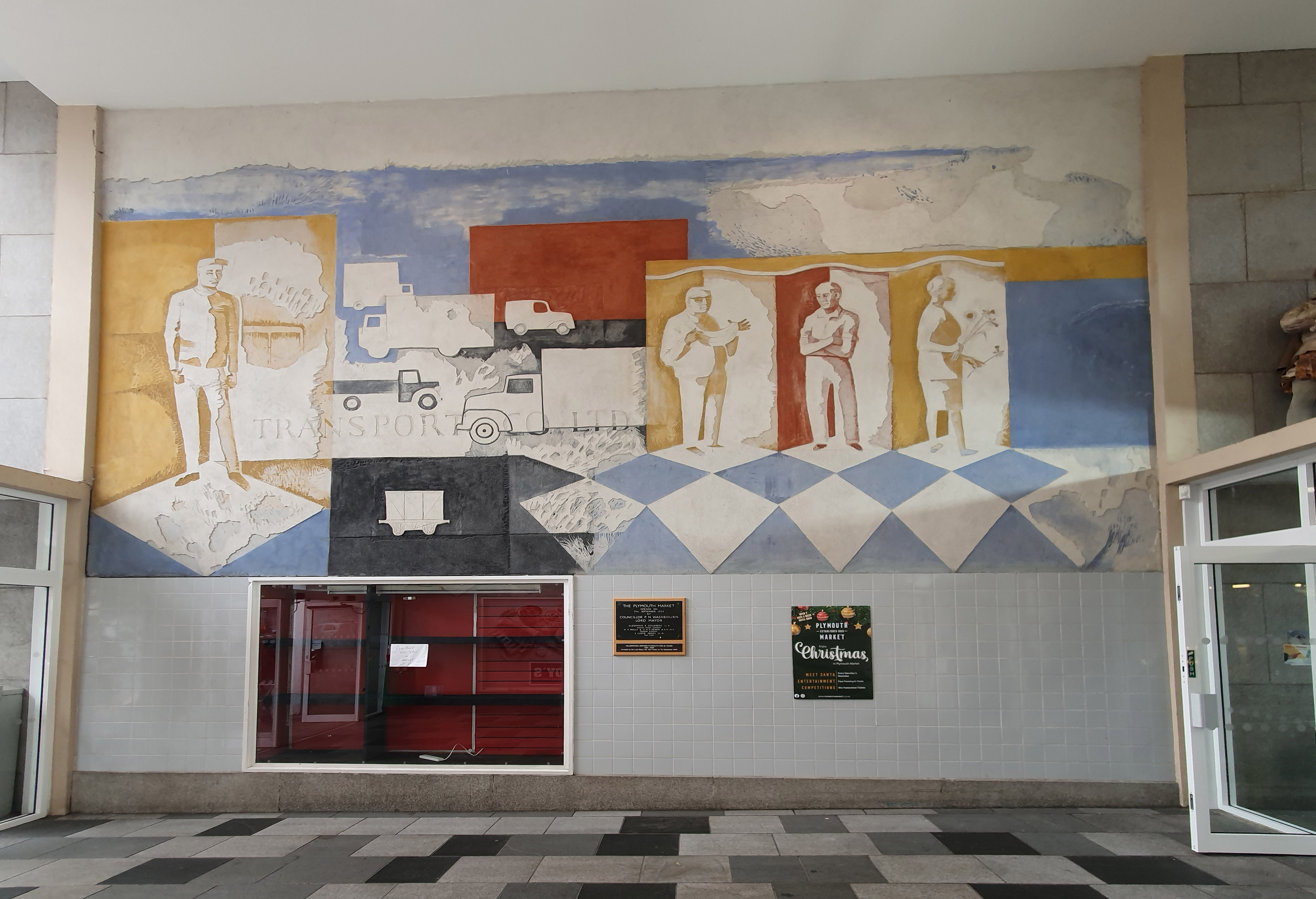
Example of porch artworks

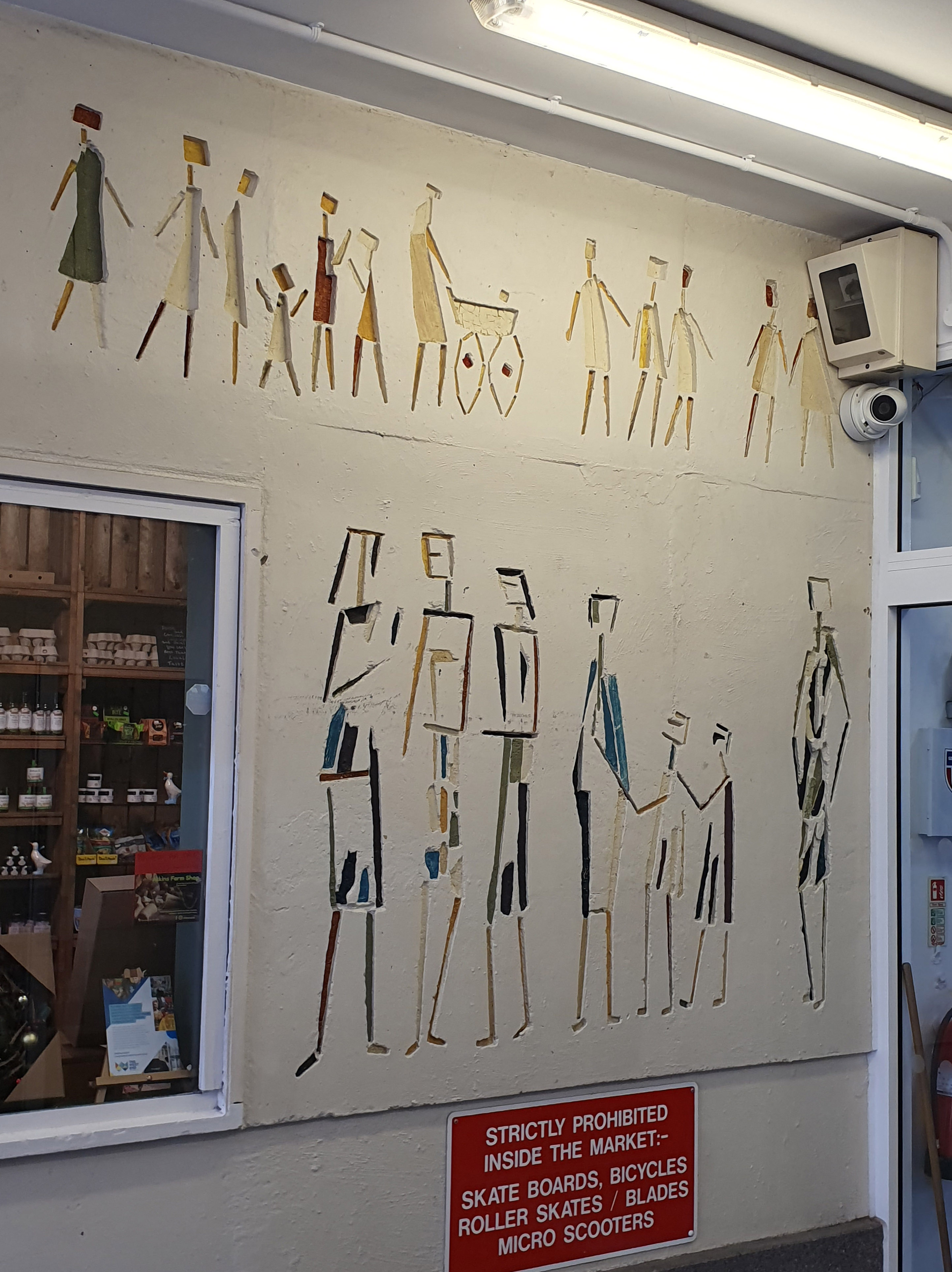
Example of porch artworks
