= Pannier Market, South Molton =

Indoor market in South Molton, Devon, England

Coordinates: 51.0169°N 3.8343°W

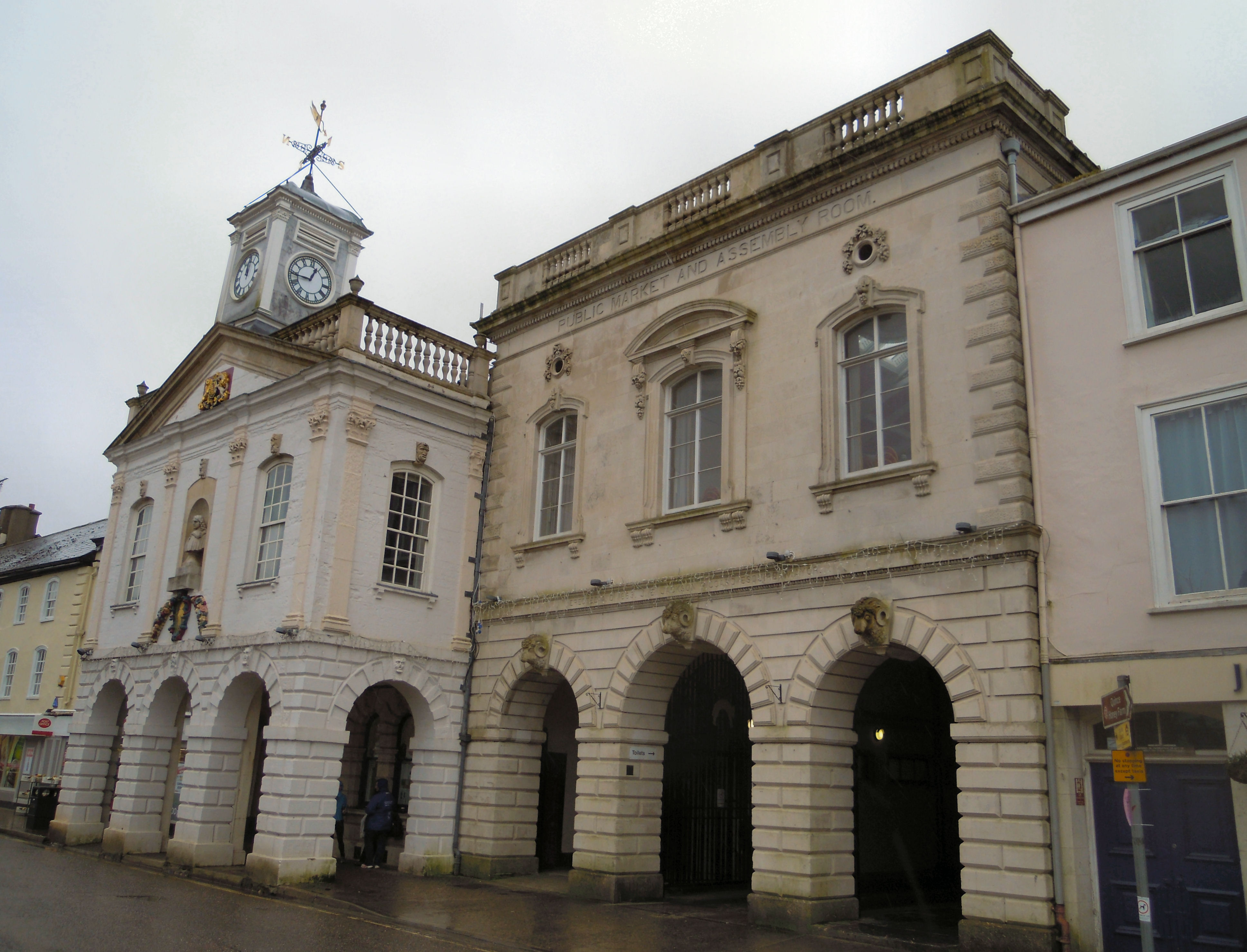
The Pannier Market is reached through the 18th-century Guildhall

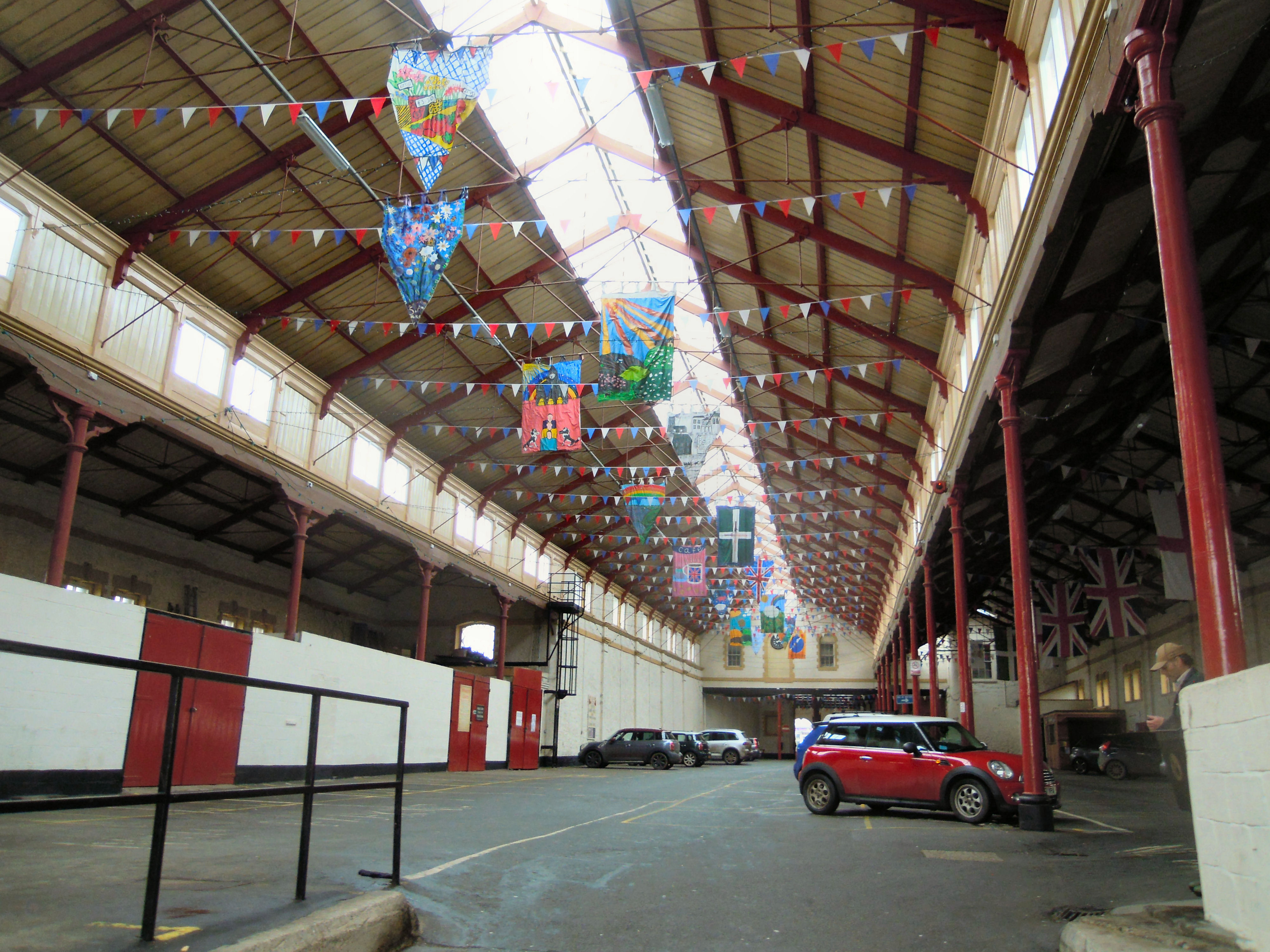
The Pannier Market hall in 2018

South Molton Pannier Market is the pannier market for the town of South Molton in Devon, England located behind the town's Grade I listed Guildhall which was constructed between 1739 and 1741.

Originally, goods were sold in the Old Market House in the town which was built to replace the shambles of butchers and other small shops which stood around the Market Square. In 1860 South Molton Town Council made the decision to build a new covered area for stall holders - the Pannier Market. A property next to the Guildhall was bought with the foundation stone being laid in 1863. Over the Market was built a large Assembly Room with an arched ceiling. The Pannier Market was opened in February 1864 by the Mayor of South Molton.

South Molton Market is held here every Thursday and Saturday from 8am to 1pm hosting about 70 local businesses selling a wide range of locally produced, reared and grown foods including fruit and veg, bread, fresh fish and meat, eggs and pasties. Other goods available include flowers, clothing, jewellery, plants, antiques and hand crafts, etc. Sunday events at the market include Salvage Fairs and Flea Markets.

== See also ==
- Pannier Market, Bideford
- Pannier Market, Barnstaple
- Pannier Market, Torrington
