= Plymouth Blitz =

WWII bombing of England

- Part of the Strategic bombing campaign of World War II
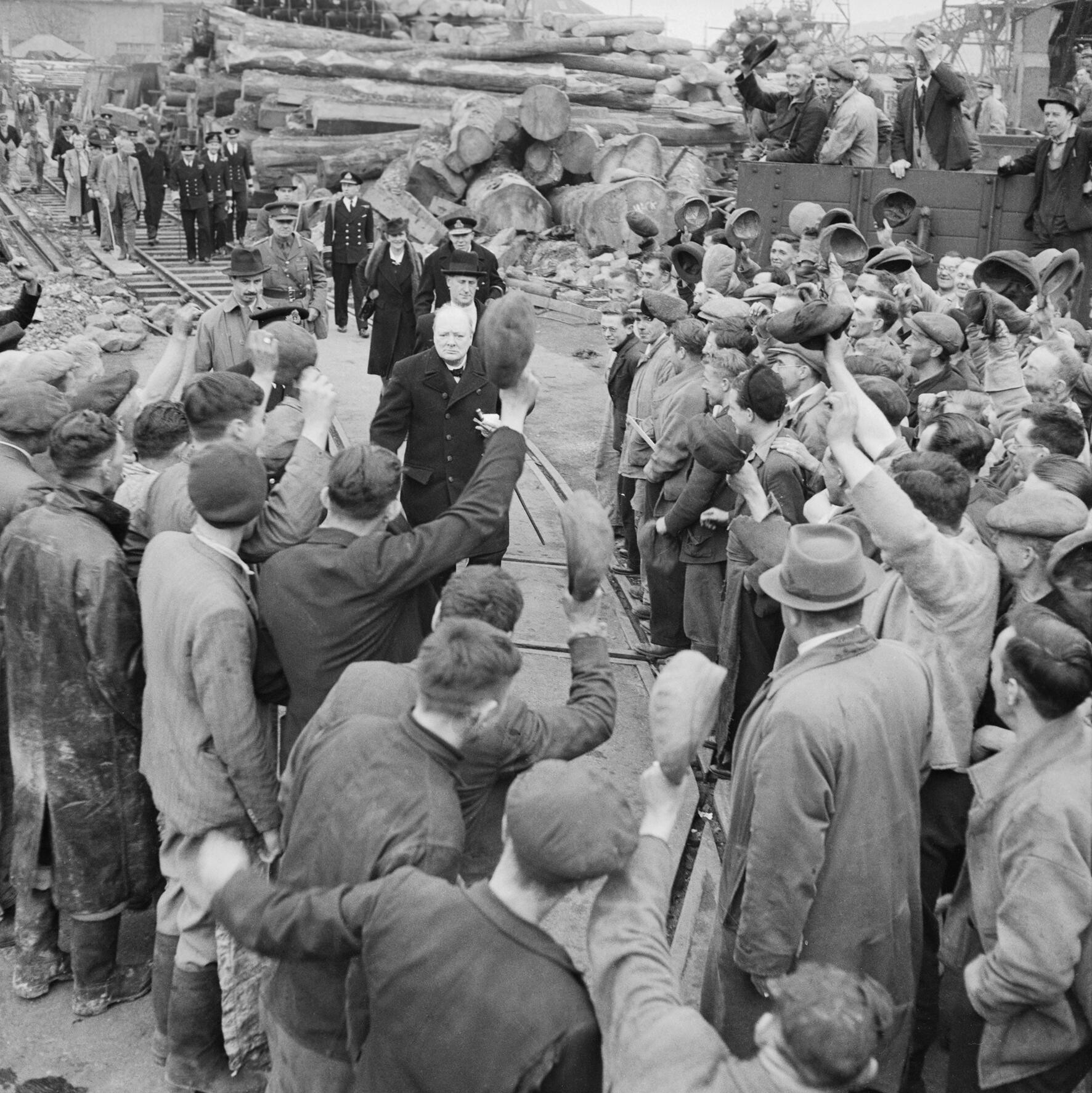
- Winston Churchill is cheered by workers during a visit to bomb-damaged Plymouth on 2 May 1941.
Date	6 July 1940 – 30 April 1944 (3 years, 9 months, 24 days)
Location	United Kingdom

Belligerents
United Kingdom	Germany

Casualties and losses
1,174 civilians killed 4,448 injured 22,143 houses damaged or destroyed	Unknown

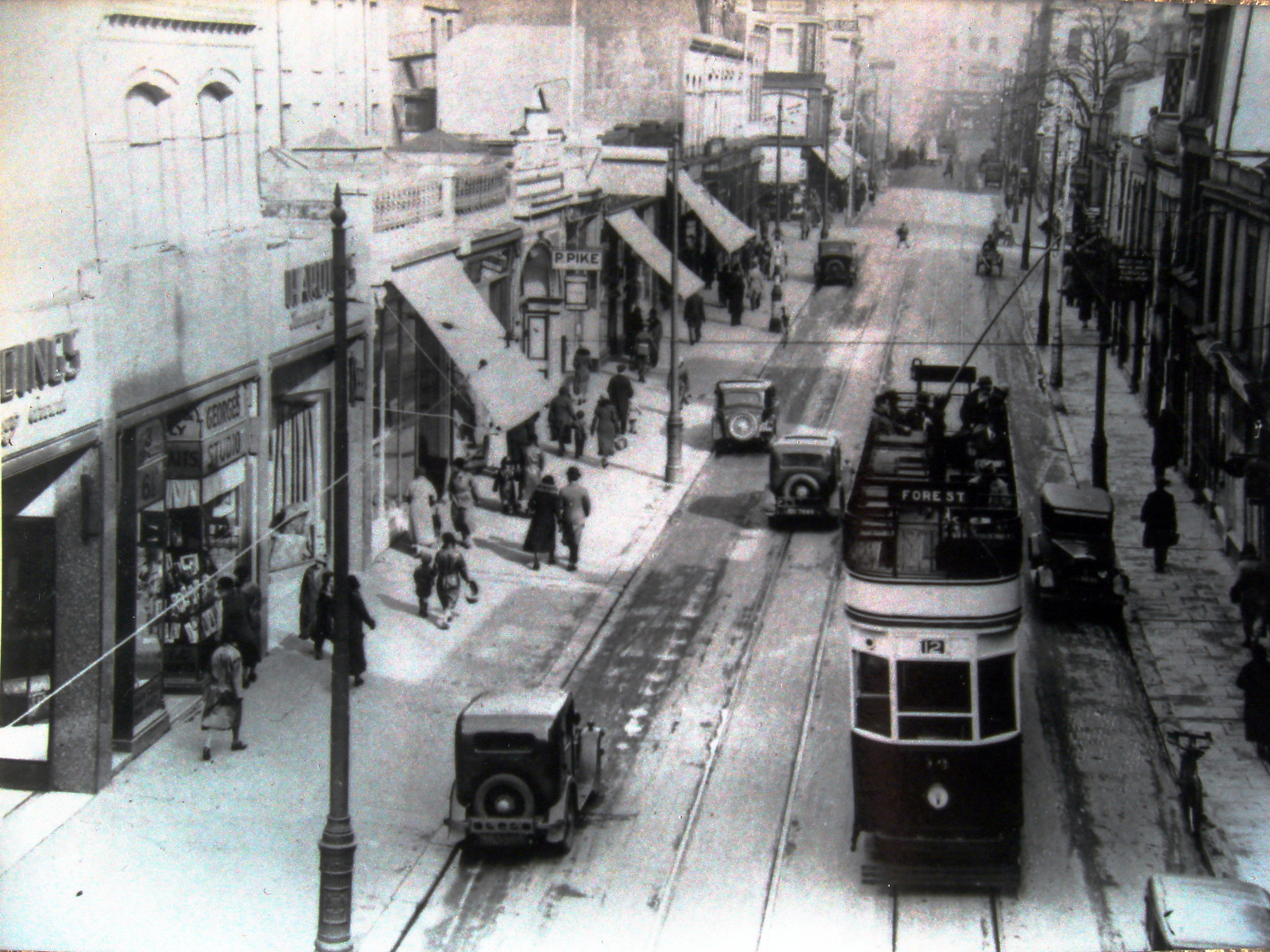
Union Street before World War II showing trams

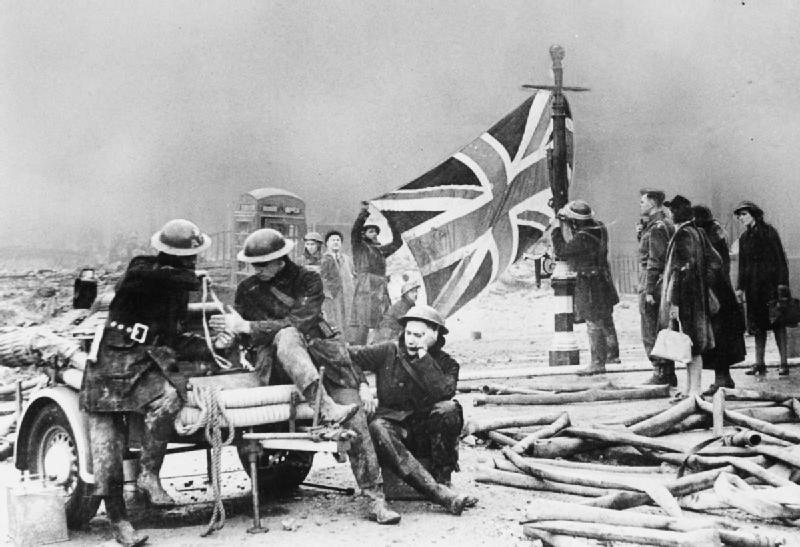
Britain's Home Front 1939 - 1945- Air Raid Damage HU36253

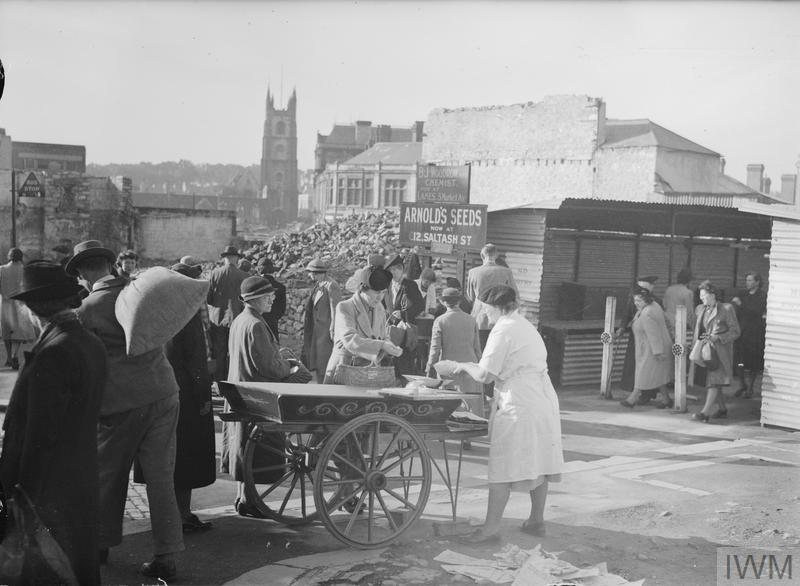
Shopping in wartime Plymouth, May 1943

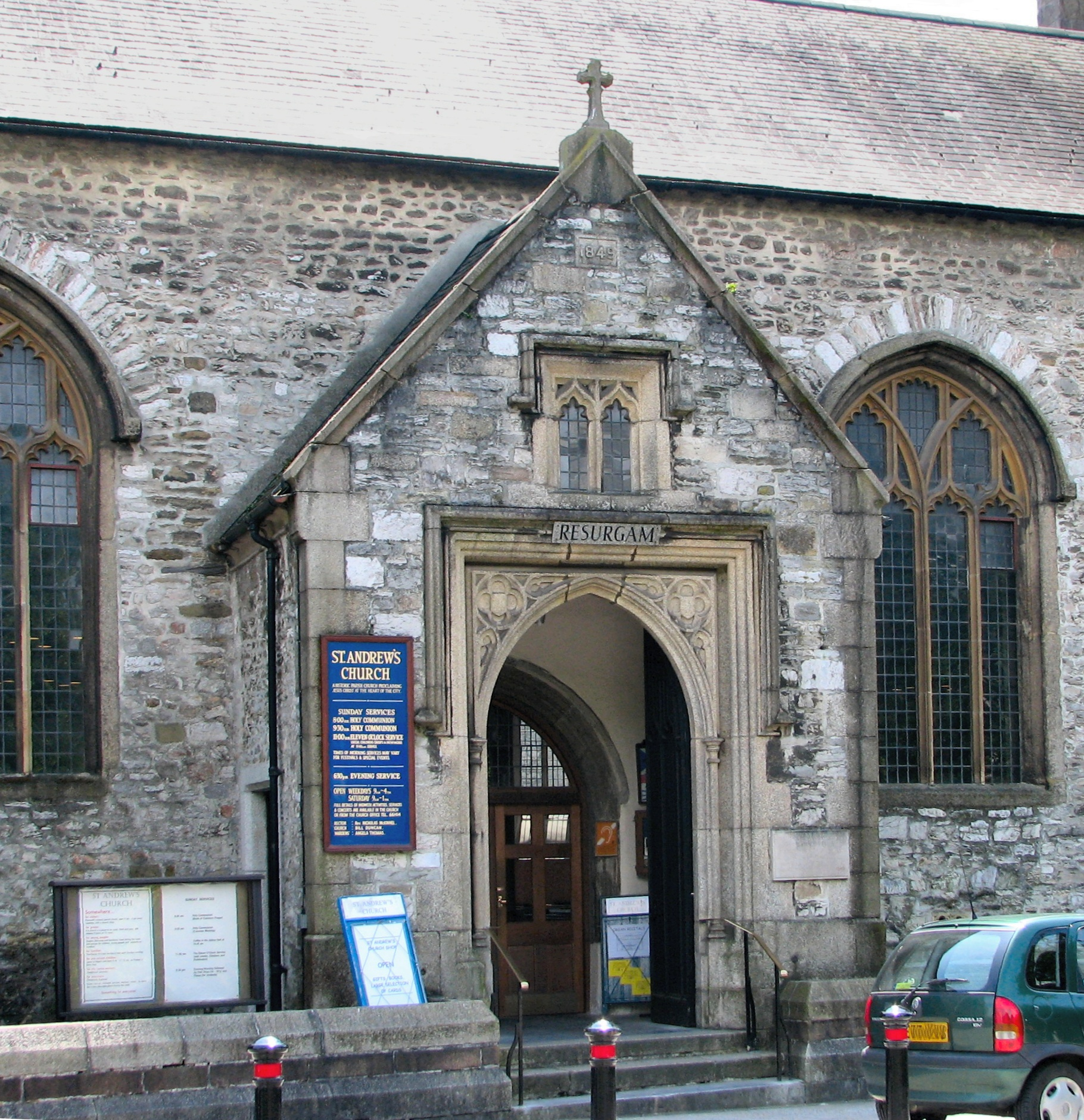
The "Resurgam" door of St Andrew's Church

The Plymouth Blitz was a series of bombing raids carried out by the German Luftwaffe against the English city of Plymouth during the Second World War as part of the Luftwaffe's strategic assault on Britain. The attacks began in July 1940 and, after reaching their height in the spring of 1941, continued intermittently until 1944. The most destructive raids took place in March and April 1941. Plymouth was targeted principally because of the strategic importance of HMNB Devonport, Britain's largest naval dockyard, and its associated industrial and military facilities. The city was among the worst-blitzed cities in England, with the scale of destruction particularly severe in proportion to its population.

The heaviest raids occurred on the nights of 20 and 21 March and 21, 22, 23, 28 and 29 April 1941. Much of the city centre was destroyed or severely damaged, including shops, civic buildings, churches, schools and thousands of homes. Those attacks accounted for the majority of the city's civilian casualties and injured hundreds more; thousands of residents were evacuated or temporarily displaced as a result of the bombing. The bombing of the communal air-raid shelter at Portland Square on the night of 22–23 April killed at least 71 people and became one of the most significant civilian tragedies of the Plymouth Blitz.

After the height of the bombardment in the spring of 1941, attacks continued intermittently until as late as May 1944, with two minor air raids in that month. (Note: "During the month of May 1944, there were eight air raid alerts and two minor air raids in this area." - ‘War Diary, 5/1-31/44’, page 3, Plymouth USNAAB, 15 June 1944) Over the course of Plymouth's 59 bombing raids, at least 1,174 civilians were killed and 4,448 injured.

The destruction resulting from the Blitz fundamentally altered Plymouth. After the war, the city centre was comprehensively replanned and rebuilt according to the Plan for Plymouth, prepared by Patrick Abercrombie and James Paton Watson. Reconstruction began in 1948 and transformed the historic street pattern of the city centre. The surviving ruins of Charles Church and other sites of wartime destruction subsequently became important memorials to the civilian victims of the Blitz.

== History ==
=== Background ===
Plymouth was an important target for German bombing because of the presence of HMNB Devonport, one of Britain's principal naval dockyards and a major base for the Royal Navy. The city also contained naval, military and industrial facilities supporting Britain's war effort. The concentration of dockyard facilities alongside densely populated residential and commercial districts meant that attacks directed at military targets also posed a substantial threat to the civilian population.

At the outbreak of the Second World War, Plymouth had a population of approximately 220,000. The city had been formed through the amalgamation of Plymouth, Devonport and East Stonehouse in 1914, and its central areas contained extensive Victorian and earlier housing, commercial premises and civic buildings. The city's geography, with the dockyard and other military installations interspersed with residential districts, contributed to the widespread effects of bombing.

=== The Bombing Campaign ===
At the beginning of the war, Plymouth was therefore neither considered entirely safe from air attack nor expected to be subjected to the level of bombing anticipated in areas closer to the principal German approach routes.

This situation changed rapidly during the spring of 1940. The German invasion of the Low Countries and France in May and June brought German forces to the western coast of continental Europe and substantially reduced the distance that German aircraft had to travel to reach south-western England. The fall of France placed the Luftwaffe's occupied bases on the French Atlantic and Channel coasts considerably closer to Plymouth. The city's strategic importance as the location of HMNB Devonport and a major naval base consequently became more significant in German planning, resulting in the wider metropolis of Plymouth becoming increasingly exposed to air attack.

The first bombs fell on the city on Saturday, 6 July 1940 at Swilly, killing three people, including a woman who had gone into her home to check in on the family dinner, a man shining his shoes on the front stoop, and a teenage boy who later died from injuries sustained that day. During the summer and early autumn, attacks remained intermittent and were generally smaller than those experienced by cities such as London, Birmingham, Coventry, Manchester and Liverpool. Plymouth's residents nevertheless faced an increasingly uneasy existence of air-raid warnings, attacks and preparations for possible bombing. The sporadic nature of the raids required the city's civil-defence authorities to conduct emergency drills and educate residents about the precautions to take during air attacks.

The pattern changed in November. Most attacks during the late autumn still involved single aircraft or relatively small formations and caused limited damage, but the raid of 27–28 November represented a significant escalation. More than 100 German aircraft took part in the attack, which was described by one witness as the most severe air raid Plymouth had yet experienced. The principal target was the Royal Air Force station at Mount Batten and its facilities for Sunderland flying boats. The attack began at approximately 7:30 p.m. in clear weather, allowing German crews to make effective use of visual bombing.

Early in the raid, German aircraft dropped flares over Plymouth Sound to illuminate the target area. One flare struck an aircraft hangar at Mount Batten, which caught fire and provided a conspicuous landmark for subsequent waves of bombers. Another aircraft struck an oil tank at Turnchapel, causing a major explosion. The resulting fires created exceptionally difficult conditions for the city's firefighters. Intense heat caused water from fire hoses to evaporate before reaching the flames, while toxic fumes forced firefighters to withdraw from some areas. When an oil tank exploded, burning oil fell onto firefighters, killing several of them. Reinforcements were brought into Plymouth to assist with the emergency response.

The resulting fire continued for several days and produced a column of smoke visible across the surrounding countryside. Despite the scale of the attack, the Luftwaffe subsequently concentrated its efforts on other British cities, including Liverpool, Southampton and London. The November raid nevertheless demonstrated the vulnerability of Plymouth's military and industrial infrastructure and foreshadowed the increasingly destructive attacks that would follow during the winter.

A further serious raid took place on the night of 28–29 December. Eleven people were killed and twelve were critically wounded. Seventeen houses were destroyed and approximately 300 others were seriously damaged. The raid also marked an escalation in the weight of German bombs used against Plymouth, including several 500-pound bombs. A one-tonne bomb that failed to explode landed beneath a house in Woldson Street and was subsequently removed by a bomb-disposal team.

=== Winter 1940–41 ===
The intensity of the attacks increased during the winter of 1940–41. Plymouth's position on the south-western coast made it particularly vulnerable to attacks launched from German-occupied France. The relatively short distance between the French coast and Plymouth reduced the warning time available to the city's defences and meant that German aircraft could reach their targets and begin their return journeys before British fighter aircraft could effectively intercept them.

On 14 January 1941, Plymouth experienced one of the most serious raids to that point. The attack lasted approximately three hours and caused extensive damage to the city's electricity and gas infrastructure. Twenty-six people were killed, sixty houses were destroyed and approximately 400 were seriously damaged, while around 2,000 other properties suffered less serious damage. The City Hospital and Prince of Wales's Hospital both received direct hits. Sherwell Congregational Church, on the edge of Portland Square, was also badly damaged after its roof caught fire, rendering the building unusable.

Another significant attack occurred on the night of 13 February. A large formation of approximately seventy German bombers was initially observed heading towards targets farther north, including Cardiff and Liverpool. On their return flight towards bases in France, the formation passed over Plymouth. Because the aircraft were believed to have already released their bombs over their primary targets, the air-raid warning was not activated. Some aircraft nevertheless retained bombs and jettisoned them over Plymouth. Among the buildings damaged was the Royal Eye Infirmary at Mutley.

The raid also caused a number of deaths among residents of Alfred Road near Devonport. Several members of local families were killed, including Violet Trotman and her children Pamela and Leonard; Joseph Henry and Edith Watts and their children Terence and Ruth; and the elderly siblings Richard and Emmeline Shears. Their deaths illustrated the increasingly personal cost of the bombing campaign as attacks reached residential areas beyond the immediate vicinity of the dockyard.

By February 1941, Plymouth had therefore experienced a marked escalation in the frequency, scale, and destructive power of German attacks. The raids of November, December, January and February had progressively tested the city's defences and emergency services. They also provided a grim prelude to the catastrophic raids of March and April, when Plymouth would experience the most destructive bombing in its history.

== The Blitz ==
In early 1941, seven night raids - 20 and 21 March and 21, 22, 23, 28, 29 April - reduced much of the city to rubble. These seven nights are, collectively, referred to as the "Plymouth Blitz."

=== March Blitz ===
The March phase began on 20 March only hours after the royal visit of King George VI and Queen Elizabeth. The city went from the heights of royal pageantry to the depths of peril as Plymouth experienced two consecutive nights of heavy aerial bombardment.

A specialized pathfinder force dropped over 12,500 incendiary devices across the city center during the initial wave, creating signal fires that guided the remainder of the 125-strong contingent that would drop 159 tonnes of high explosives and 30,000 incendiaries.

The assault resumed on March 21, when 168 bombers dropped an additional 36,000 incendiaries and 197 tonnes of explosives over a four-hour window.

The resulting firestorm destroyed central Plymouth's commercial and civic infrastructure. Prominent department stores, hotels, historic churches, and municipal offices near Guildhall Square were reduced to smouldering ruins, while approximately 20,000 properties sustained damage. Emergency personnel faced broken water mains, incompatible equipment from outside fire units, and destroyed communications. The two raids resulted in 336 fatalities, overwhelming the local mortuary network and prompting emergency daily bulletins to coordinate temporary housing, relief operations, and the relocation of local commerce to outlying districts.

=== April Blitz ===
Following a month-long lull with a couple of so-called nuisance raids, 120 German aircraft renewed the assault on the night of April 21, 1941, conducting a six-hour strike. The attack force dropped 35,996 incendiary devices alongside 704 high-explosive bombs—including 31 one-tonne blockbusters—targeting both maritime infrastructure and urban areas. The bombardment damaged key facilities at the naval dockyards, including a direct strike on a barracks block that killed 96 personnel.

Severe destruction also spread across densely populated residential neighborhoods north of the city center, resulting in at least 113 civilian fatalities and destroying businesses that had recently relocated after the March raids. Regional Civil Defence leadership stepped in to assist the overwhelmed local Emergency Committee, while fear of repeated nightly attacks prompted thousands of residents to evacuate to the countryside each evening.

On the evening of 22 April 1941 during an attack on the central area, the communal air-raid shelter at Portland Square took a direct hit just after midnight which killed at least 71 people. The incident was the city's single-deadliest civilian fatality incident of the war and among the most severe on the British Home Front.

This intensity continued on the evening of 23 April and again on 28 and 29 April when the Luftwaffe strike force expanded the target zone and concentrated efforts on districts closer to HMNB Devonport.

== Reconstruction and Remembrance ==
=== Resurgam ===
In March 1941, St Andrew's Parish Church was bombed and badly damaged. A headmistress of a girls' school, Margaret Smith, arranged to have a wooden sign nailed over the door saying simply Resurgam (Latin for I shall rise again), indicating the wartime spirit that would become Plymouth's watchword. Today, that entrance to St Andrew's is still referred to as the "Resurgam" door and a carved granite plaque is now permanently fixed there.

=== Cityscape ===
During the Blitz the two main shopping centres and nearly every civic building within a half-mile radius of the Guildhall were destroyed, along with 26 schools, eight cinemas, and 41 churches. In total, 3,754 houses were destroyed, with a further 18,398 seriously damaged.

So great was the devastation of the largely Victorian era streets of central Plymouth, that in the autumn of 1941, the City Council appointed Professor Patrick Abercrombie, an eminent town planner, to prepare a plan for the city's reconstruction. The completed plan, which was co-authored by James Paton Watson, A Plan for Plymouth, was published in March 1944, and proposed a radical redevelopment. Main roads were diverted around the city, while the original street plan of city centre, with the exception of Union Street, was to be erased and replaced with a grand vista leading from Naval Memorial on Plymouth Hoe to Plymouth railway station, intersected by new roads and lined by modern buildings. The Plymouth Athenaeum and the Pannier Market were among the buildings which were rebuilt during the reconstruction. Plymouth was the only British city to retain its wartime plans; reconstruction of the city centre began in 1948 and was completed in 1962.

=== Memorials ===
Charles Church, Plymouth, destroyed by incendiaries on the nights of 20–21 March 1941, has been preserved in its ruined state as a memorial to civilian victims of the Blitz.

The Portland Square incident was commemorated by the University of Plymouth, which named a new building (Portland House) on the site of the incident, and commissioned local artist Frances Favata to create a commemorative piece. Barbara Mills (nee Cundy), who was the last living survivor of the tragedy, had the honor of unveiling the statue Hope.

== Bibliography ==
- "75th Anniversary - Portland Square Air Raid Shelter Bombing". plymouth.ac.uk. University of Plymouth. Archived from the original on 21 March 2018.
- Bayley, Jon (14 November 2017). "Fascinating footage show bunker under Plymouth University". plymouthherald.co.uk. Plymouth Herald.
- Gardiner, Juliet. The Blitz: The British under attack. (Harper Press, 2010).
- Gill, Crispin (1993). Plymouth. A New History. Devon Books. pp. 259–262. ISBN 0-86114-882-7.
- Gould, Jeremy (2010). Plymouth: Vision of a modern city. Swindon: English Heritage. ISBN 978-1848023222.
- Hardy, A.C. (1946). "Stanley Wells Kemp 1882-1945" (PDF). Archived from the original (PDF) on 3 March 2012.
- Masters, Warren, Plymouth in the Blitz (The heavy raids March and April 1941)
- McLaughlin, Michael C. 'Burying the Blitz: The Grief and Politics of Commemoration in Wartime Plymouth,' The Journal of the Institute of Cemetery and Crematorium Management (Summer, 2025, p. 10-11)
- McLaughlin, Michael C. 'Churchill Visits Plymouth, 2 May 1941, Finest Hour (December, 2023, p. 32-37).
- McLaughlin, Michael C. 'Civilian Casualty Management in World War II: A Case Study of Plymouth’s Halwell Street Mortuary;, Omega: The Journal of Death and Dying (2024)
- McLaughlin, Michael C. (2026). Plymouth Blitz: The Bombing of Portland Square and the Devastation of a City. Pharos Publishing. ISBN 1784276731. www.michaelwriteshistory.com
- McLaughlin, Michael C. 'Private and Public Civilian Burial in Second World War Britain: A Case Study of the Plymouth Blitz,' The Journal of Mortality (2026); Mortality, 31(3), 809–825. (Originally e-published December 2025)
- McLaughlin, Michael C. Voices from the Blitz: The Portland Square Air Raid Shelter Tragedy, 23 April 1941 (Old Plymouth Society, 2026)
- "Places of Worship". www.plymouth.gov.uk. Plymouth City Council. Archived from the original on 13 October 2007.
- Ramsey, W. G. (Ed.). The Blitz: Then and now (Vols. 1–3). (After the Battle, 1987-1990)
- Twyford, H. P. It came to our door. (Underhill, 1947).
- Van der Kiste, John Plymouth: A city at war 1914–45. (The History Press, 2014).
- "War Diary, 5/1-31/44". www.fold3.com. Plymouth USNAAB. 15 June 1944 – via Fold3.
- Wasley, Gerald, Blitz: An account of Hitler's aerial war over Plymouth in March 1941, and the events that followed. (Halsgrove, 1991).
