= Pannier market =

British indoor market hall

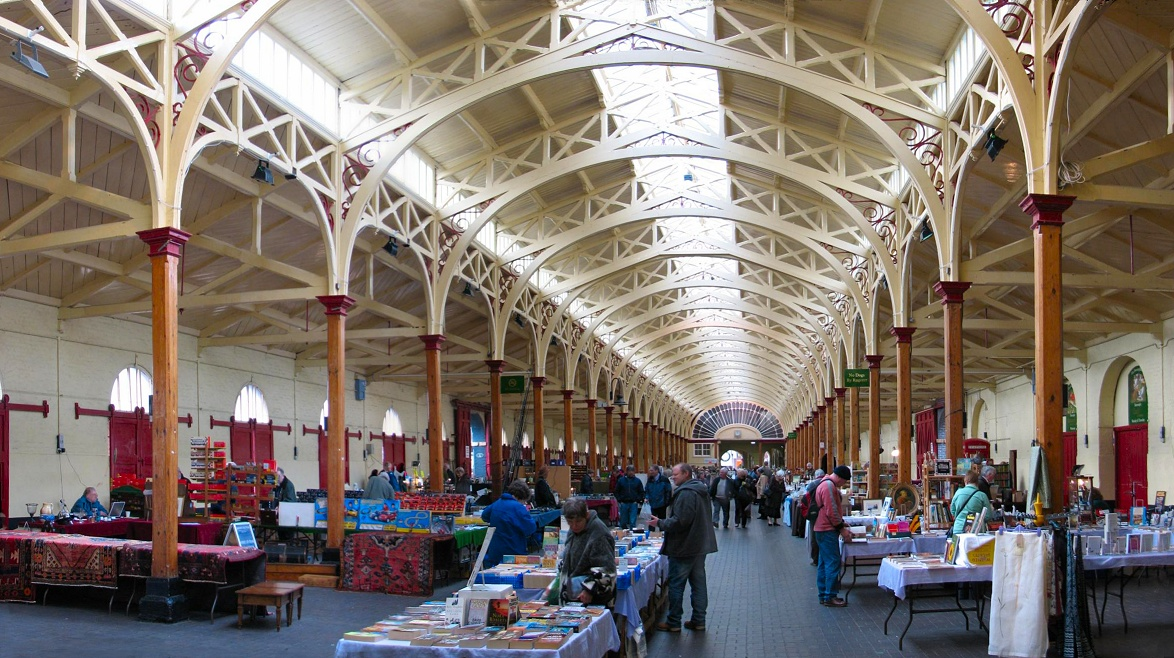
The interior of the Pannier Market at Barnstaple in Devon

A pannier market is a form of indoor market especially popular in Devon in the West Country of the United Kingdom where they can be found in various cities and towns. They take their name from the panniers once used to carry goods to market on the back of pack animals.

The word "pannier" derives from the French meaning 'basket', so "pannier market" literally means "basket market"; in Devon it has become a term for a fruit and vegetable market. Today they are a form of market hall that will have market stalls from which goods are sold. Examples can be found in Plymouth, Truro, Bideford, Great Torrington, Barnstaple, Tavistock, Tiverton, Newton Abbot, Holsworthy and Sherborne, among others.

== Pannier markets ==
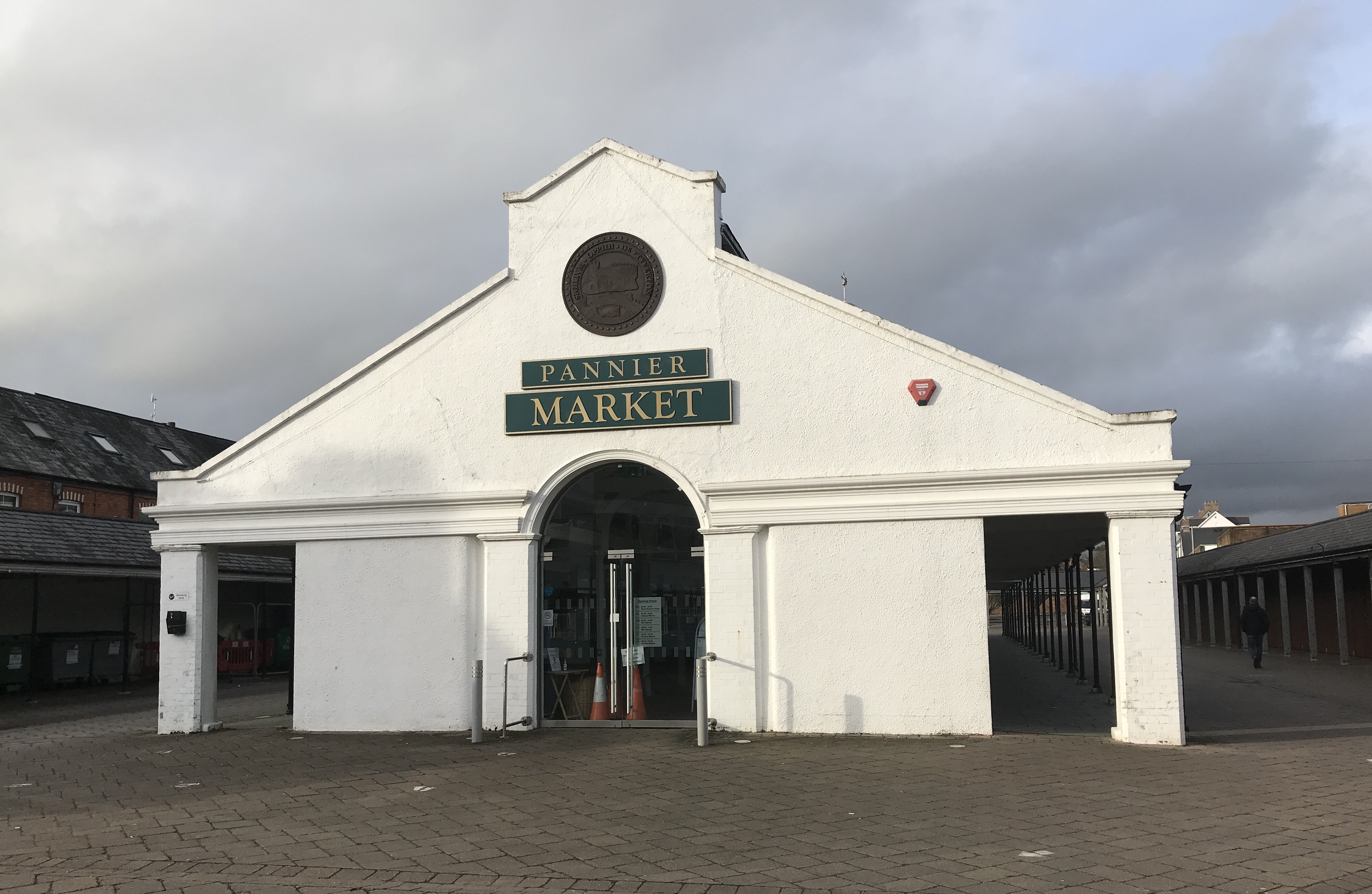
The Pannier Market in Tiverton, Devon in 2021

- Pannier Market, Bideford
- Pannier Market, Barnstaple
- Pannier Market, Plymouth
- Pannier Market, Torrington
- Pannier Market, South Molton
