= Danny Southworth =

Welsh rugby player (born 1999)

- Born: 4 May 1999 (age 27) Barnstaple, England
- Height: 183 cm (6 ft 0 in)
- Weight: 120 kg (265 lb)
- School: Pilton Community College

Rugby union career
- Position: Loosehead Prop
- Current team: Cardiff
Senior career
Years	Team	Apps	(Points)
2020–2024	Exeter Chiefs	26	(10)
2022–2023	→ Coventry	11	(0)
2024–	Cardiff	23	(15)
International career
Years	Team	Apps	(Points)
2025–	Wales	1	(0)

Danny Southworth (born 4 December 1999) is a Welsh professional rugby union footballer who plays as a prop for Cardiff Rugby. Born in England, he was called up to represent Wales at international level in 2025, qualifying on ancestry grounds.

== Club career ==
=== Exeter Chiefs ===
Born in Barnstaple, Devon, Southworth started playing rugby union for his home town club Barnstaple RFC before signing to the academy at Exeter Chiefs.

Initially a number eight, he transitioned to play as a prop forward. Southworth had a try-scoring senior debut for Exeter in 2020, scoring against Wasps in the Rugby Premiership. He made 25 appearances in total for the Exeter Chiefs first team, and also featured for the club in the European Rugby Champions Cup.

=== Coventry ===
Southworth joined Coventry R.F.C. on loan ahead of the 2022–23 RFU Championship. He returned to them once more on loan in November 2023.

=== Cardiff ===
Southworth joined Cardiff Rugby ahead of the 2024-25 season. He made his debut in the opening round against Zebre Parma. In May 2025, he signed a new contract with the club.

== International career ==
=== Wales ===
Southworth qualifies for Wales through his grandparents. In October 2025, he was named in the senior Wales squad for the Autumn International series. He made his debut on 29 November 2025, against South Africa.
