= Albert Memorial (disambiguation) =

The Albert Memorial is a memorial in London, England, to Prince Albert, the consort of Queen Victoria. A related memorial is the adjacent Royal Albert Hall, a concert hall.

It may also refer to:

- Albert Clock, Barnstaple, a clock tower in Barnstaple, Devon
- Albert Memorial Clock, Belfast, a clock tower in Belfast, Northern Ireland
- Royal Albert Memorial Museum, a museum in Exeter, Devon
- The memorial monument in Albert Square, Manchester, a square in Manchester
- Statue of Albert, Prince Consort, North Inch, a memorial in Perth, Scotland
- Prince Albert Memorial, Swanage, an obelisk memorial in Swanage, Dorset
- Albert Lock, a lock on the Jamestown Canal in Ireland
- Albert Medal (Royal Society of Arts), a medal awarded by the Royal Society of Arts

The Albert Memorial Bridge (Regina, Saskatchewan) is not a memorial to Prince Albert; it is a memorial to WWI soldiers, and it is named 'Albert' as it carries Albert Street.
