= Jed Harper-Penman =

English footballer (born 1994)

Personal information
- Full name: Jed Ethan Patrick Harper-Penman
- Date of birth: 1 February 1994 (age 32)
- Place of birth: Barnstaple, England
- Height: 5 ft 7 in (1.70 m)
- Position: Winger

Team information
- Current team: Torrington FC

Youth career
- –2008: Barnstaple Town
- 2008–2011: Plymouth Argyle

Senior career*
Years	Team	Apps	(Gls)
2011–2012	Plymouth Argyle	2	(0)
2012	→ Bideford (loan)		
2013	Barnstaple Town		
2013	Frome Town	3	(1)
2013	Truro City	1	(0)
2013–2018	Barnstaple Town	+19	(0)
2018–?	Willand Rovers		
- Torrington FC
- * Club domestic league appearances and goals as of 16:10, 14 October 2013 (UTC)

Jed Ethan Patrick Harper-Penman (born 1 February 1994) is an English footballer who plays for Torrington F.C. as a winger.

== Playing career ==
Harper-Penman began his career with local side Barnstaple Town, playing in their youth team. He attended training sessions in Chivenor with the Plymouth Argyle Development Centre before joining the club's Centre of Excellence in 2008 on a two-year contract. Having progressed to the club's youth team, he signed a two-year professional apprenticeship which began in July 2010. He was promoted to the first team squad in April 2011, along with Jake Baker, after impressing manager Peter Reid while playing for the reserve side. "It's all experience for them being with the first team, and you can't buy that," said Reid. He made his debut on 5 April 2011 in a 2–0 defeat at Leyton Orient, replacing Joe Mason as a second-half substitute. Harper-Penman signed his first professional contract in July 2012.

He joined Southern League Premier Division side Bideford on loan for three months on 4 August. Harper-Penman returned to Argyle at the end of the loan and was released when his contract expired in December. He rejoined Western League Premier Division club Barnstaple Town in January 2013, and scored three goals in his first two appearances. He moved to Frome Town in March until the end of the season, and played in three games. Harper-Penman joined Southern League Premier Division side Truro City in August, having spent time on trial there in pre-season, and made one appearance later that month. He returned to Barnstaple in September and scored in his first game.

== Personal life ==
Harper-Penman was born in Barnstaple, and has an older brother called Aaron, who has played non-League football as a defender. He attended Pilton Community College in Barnstaple in his youth.

== Career statistics ==
As of match played on 9 April 2011.

Appearances and goals by club, season and competition
Club	Season	League		FA Cup		League Cup		Other		Total	
Club	Season	Apps	Goals	Apps	Goals	Apps	Goals	Apps	Goals	Apps	Goals
Plymouth Argyle	2010–11	2	0	0	0	0	0	0	0	2	0
Plymouth Argyle	2011–12	0	0	0	0	0	0	0	0	0	0
Plymouth Argyle	2012–13	0	0	0	0	0	0	0	0	0	0
