= Tarka Leisure Centre =

Leisure centre in Barnstaple, England

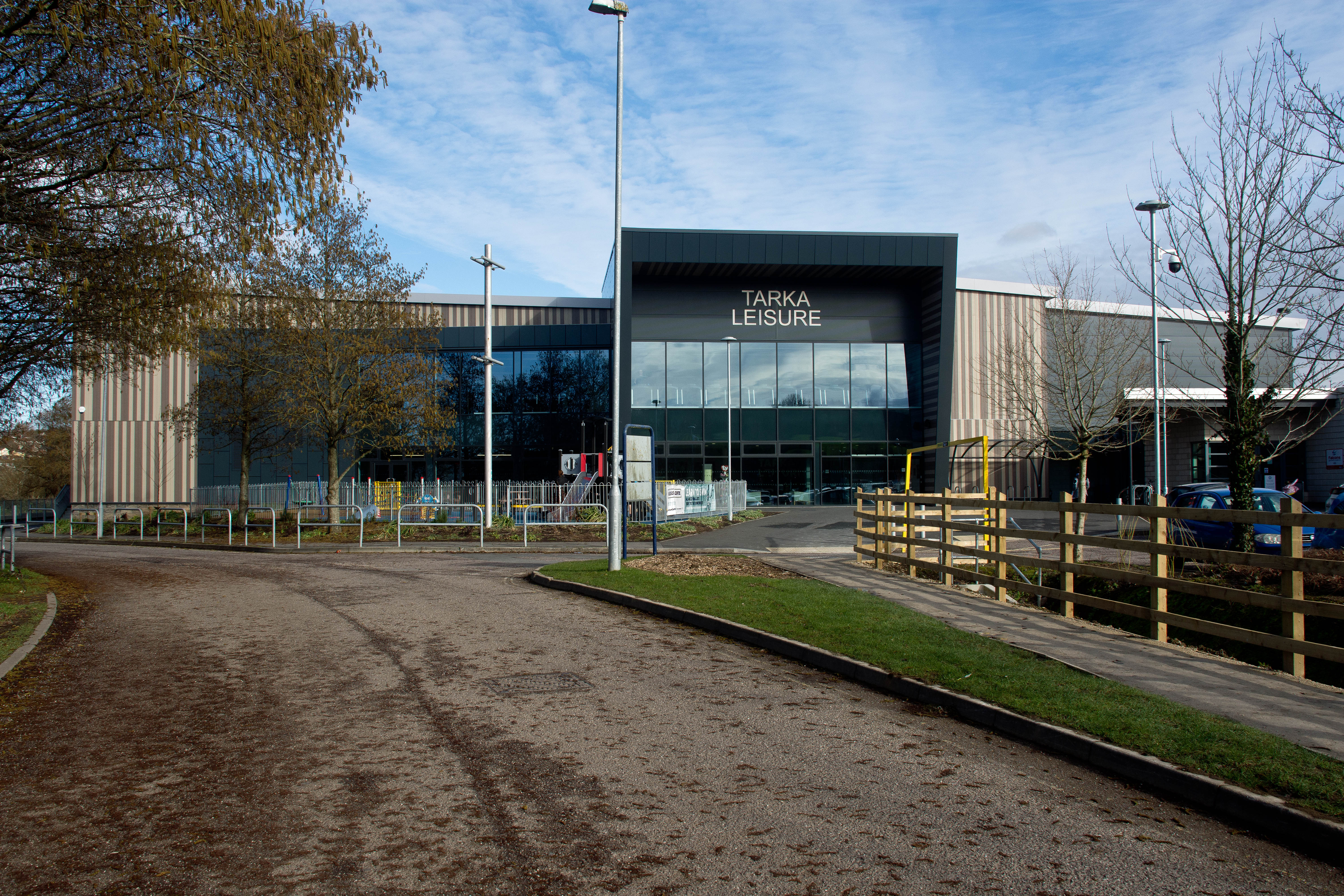
- Interactive map of the Tarka Leisure Centre area

General information
- Location: Barnstaple, UK
- Coordinates: 51°4′19.93″N 4°3′25.65″W
- Construction started: September 2020
- Opened: 24 June 2022

Design and construction
- Architecture firm: Watson Batty Architects
- Main contractor: Speller Metcalfe

Tarka Leisure Centre is a leisure centre in Barnstaple, Devon, England.

== History ==
Plans to close North Devon Leisure Centre and construct a new centre adjacent to the Tarka Tennis site were abandoned in February 2009 as they were deemed too expensive at the time.

Construction on a replacement leisure centre finally began in September 2020. The main contractor was Speller Metcalfe and the building was designed by Watson Batty Architects. The building was built adjacent to the former Tennis Centre to form one large facility. North Devon Leisure Centre remained open until the completion of the new leisure centre. The facility was opened on 24 June 2022 by Eddie the Eagle.

== Facilities ==
The leisure centre contains a 25-metre (82-foot) swimming pool with eight lanes and a 20-metre (66-foot) swimming pool with four lanes. Both pools have a moveable floor. It also contains an "endless" indoor ski slope, the first of its type in Devon. Additionally, it contains sports halls, a gym, indoor and outdoor soft play areas, and a cafe.

It is operated by Parkwood Leisure.
