= Rock Park =

Public park in Devon, England

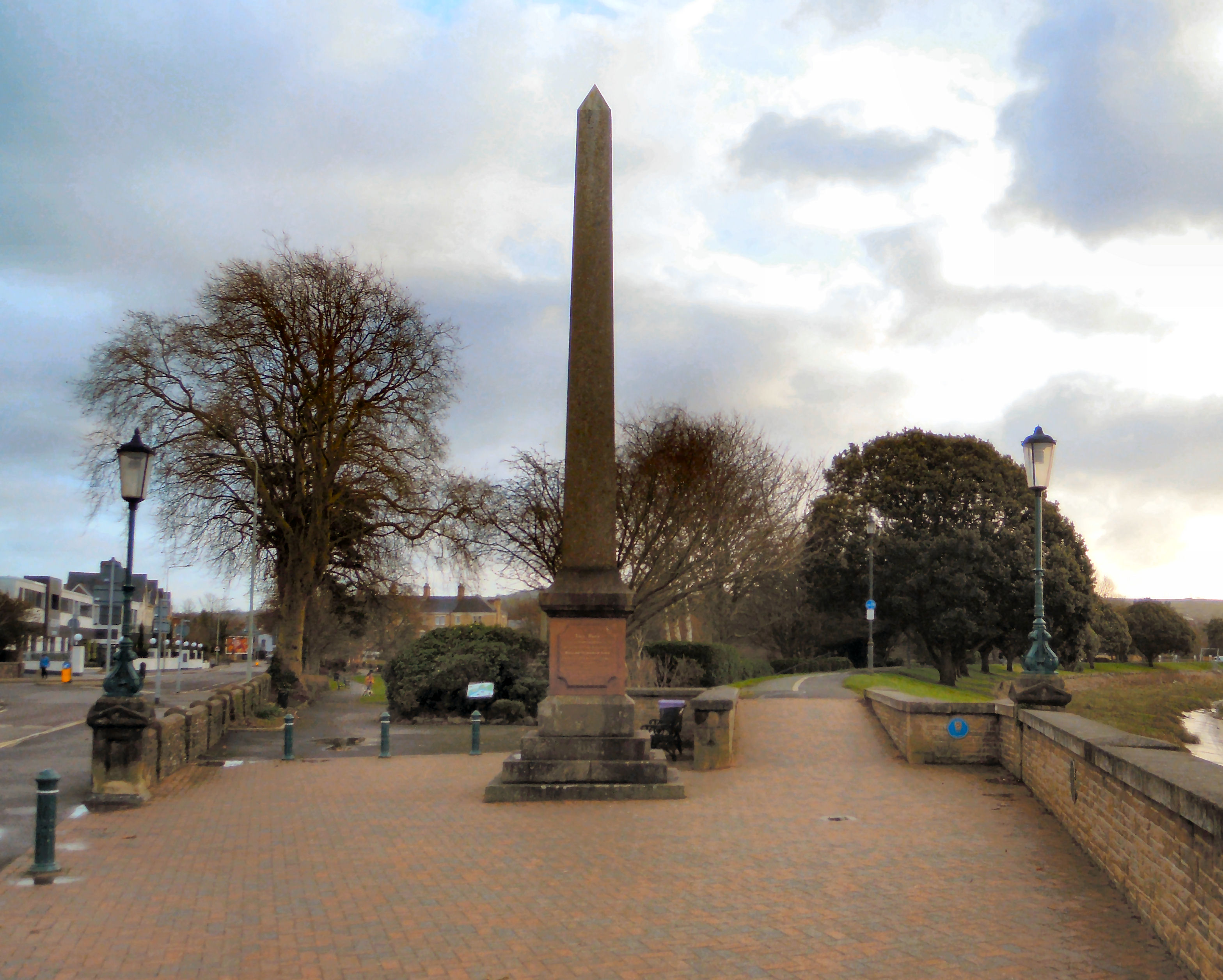
- Obelisk at the entrance to Rock Park
- Interactive map of Rock Park
- Type: Urban Park
- Location: Barnstaple, Devon, England
- Coordinates: 51.0736°N 4.0561°W
- Created: 1879
- Operator: Barnstaple Town Council
- Open: All year
- Website: Barnstaple Town Council

Rock Park is an urban park in Barnstaple, Devon, England. The park was donated to the public by William Frederick Rock and opened in 1879. It has a number of listed structures including an obelisk at the entrance to the park, a lodge and a range of historic lamp posts.

== History ==
The park was donated to the public by William Frederick Rock and officially opened 12 August 1879. It was designed and laid out by RD Gould. The opening was commemorated with an obelisk at the entrance to the park which is a listed structure with Historic England. William Rock was born in Barnstaple and educated at Christ's Hospital London, he started a successful printing business and became wealthy. He became a benefactor to the town founding the literary and scientific foundation in 1845, Rock Park in 1879 and North Devon Athenæum in 1888.

== Landmarks ==
The park contains a number of structures listed with Historic England. These include Rock Park Lodge which was built in Queen Anne style. There are a number of historic lamp posts with one erected around the time of the park's opening designed in a Free Baroque style. There are a pair of lampstands with pedestal bottoms dating to the same time at the entrance to the park.

== Facilities ==
There is a children's play area, tennis, crown green bowling, basketball, football, a skatepark, footpaths and walking along the River Taw, an outdoor gym and refreshment kiosk. Barnstaple Parkrun takes place in the park every Saturday morning at 9am, it is 5 km in length and run on the park's footpaths.
