= George Hart (cricketer) =

English cricketer

George Edmead Hart (13 January 1902 – 11 April 1987) was an English first-class cricketer active 1926–39 who played for Middlesex. He was born in Harlington, Middlesex; died in Barnstaple.
