= Charles Poynder =

English cricketer

Personal information
- Full name: Charles Eustace Hadden Poynder
- Born: 15 July 1910; Barnstaple, Devon, England
- Died: 29 August 1994 (aged 84); Peterborough, Cambridgeshire, England
- Batting: Right-handed

Domestic team information
- Years: Team
- 1937: Minor Counties
- 1928–1946: Devon

Career statistics
Competition	First-class
Matches	1
Runs scored	6
Batting average	3.00
100s/50s	–/–
Top score	6
Balls bowled	–
Wickets	–
Bowling average	–
5 wickets in innings	–
10 wickets in match	–
Best bowling	–
Catches/stumpings	–/–
- Source: Cricinfo, 18 February 2011

Charles Eustace Hadden Poynder (15 July 1910 – 29 August 1994) was an English cricketer. Poynder was a right-handed batsman. He was born in Barnstaple, Devon.

Poynder made his Minor Counties Championship debut for Devon in 1928 against Dorset. From 1928 to 1946, he represented the county in 46 Championship matches, the last of which came against Dorset. In 1937, Poynder made his only first-class appearance when he represented a combined Minor Counties team against the touring New Zealanders at the Rose Brothers Ground, Gainsborough. In the Minor Counties first-innings he scored 3 runs before being dismissed by Bill Carson. in their second innings he was again dismissed for 3 runs by the same bowler.

He died in Peterborough, Cambridgeshire on 29 August 1994.
