= Pilton Community College =

Location
- Chaddiford Lane; Pilton; Barnstaple, Devon, EX31 1RB; England
- 51.08795°N 4.06947°W

Information
- Type: Academy
- Trust: harbour
- Department for Education URN: 136867 Tables
- Ofsted: Reports
- Headteacher: Graham Hill
- Gender: Coeducational
- Age: 11 to 16
- Enrolment: 1,088 as of June 2023
- Website: http://www.piltoncollege.org.uk/

Pilton Community College is a coeducational secondary school located in the Pilton area of Barnstaple in the English county of Devon.

Previously a community school administered by Devon County Council, Pilton Community College converted to academy status on 1 July 2011. The school is now sponsored by the harbour Trust.

Pilton Community College offers GCSEs, BTECs and ASDAN courses as programmes of study for pupils. The school is also a specialist language college.

== Notable former pupils ==
- Stuart Brennan, actor and film maker
- Jed Harper-Penman, footballer
- Danny Southworth, Rugby Player
