= Fresh FM (Petroc) =

Coordinates: 51.0725°N 4.0701°W

England
- Frequency: 87.7 MHz

Programming
- Format: Student

Ownership
- Owner: Petroc

History
- First air date: 2001

Fresh FM (formerly Acorn FM) is a student-run radio station based at the Barnstaple campus of Petroc, a further education college in North Devon, England. It broadcasts on 87.7 MHz FM across the college campus between the hours of 8:30 and 18:30 on college days. The station has a long term Restricted Service Licence granted by Ofcom.

The station is presented and run by college students, with a small base of student presenters and a handful of executive committee members, appointed by the Station Manager, who oversee, manage and make any crucial decisions regarding the station. It comprises a Station Manager, a Head of Music, a Programme Controller, and a Head of Events, and is often assisted by an allocated staff member.
