= Barnstaple Cemetery =

Cemetery in Devon, England

Coordinates: 51.08205°N 4.04779°W

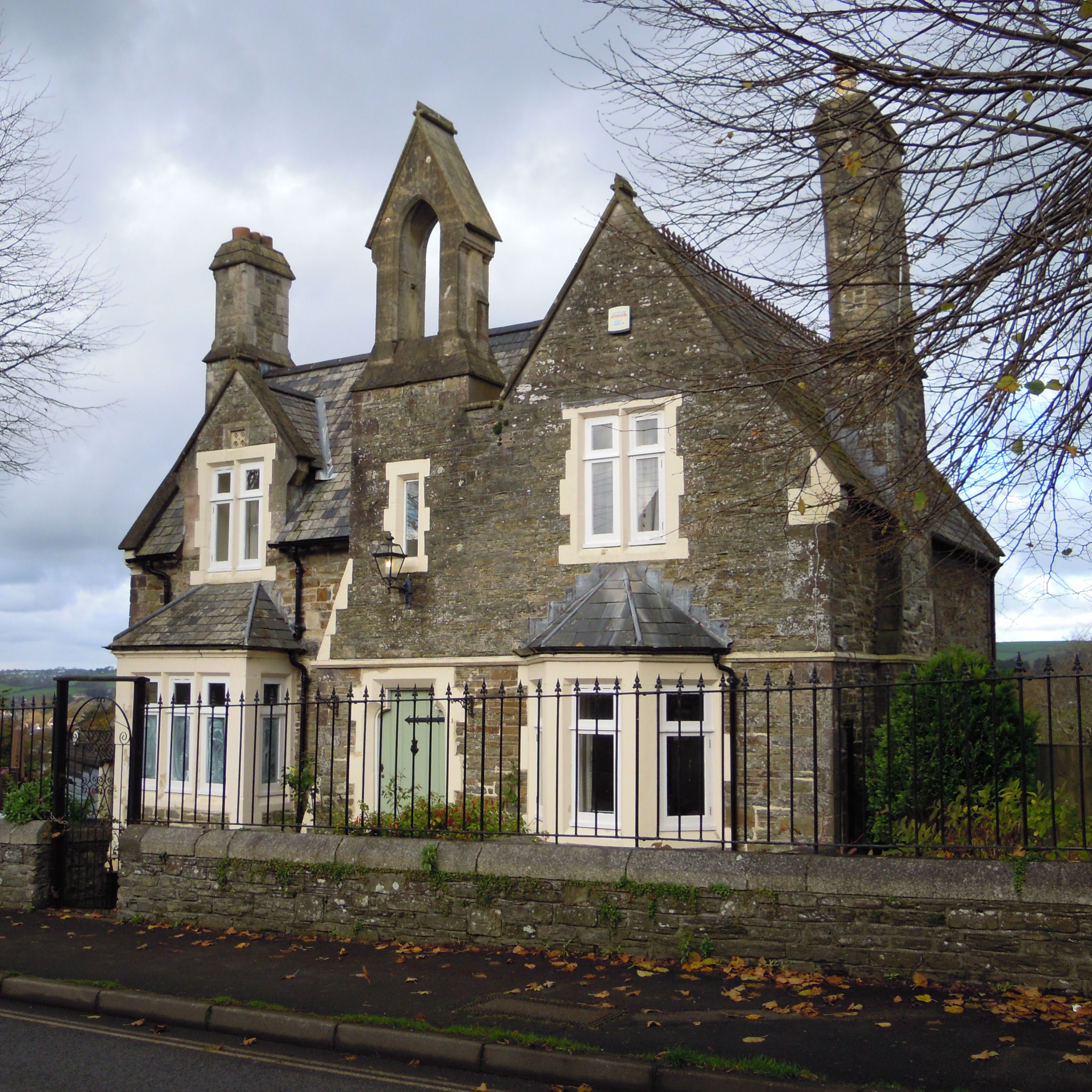
The former Cemetery Lodge, now a private residence

Barnstaple Cemetery (properly Bear Street Cemetery) is the burial ground for the town of Barnstaple in Devon and is managed by North Devon Council.

The cemetery opened in 1856 for the Barnstaple Burial Board and extends over an area of 13.2 acres and is bisected by a stream between the two slopes on which the cemetery is laid out. It has two chapels and a Cemetery Lodge (now in private ownership), with the Lodge being designed by the Barnstaple Borough Surveyor Richard Davie Gould and having Grade II listed building status since 1999. The main entrance with a small parking area is located on Derby Road in Barnstaple with a pedestrian entrance accessible on Bear Street. The cemetery has a range of grave types set in a mature landscaped setting and incorporates areas for the burial or scattering of ashes. There is also a Children's Area designated for the burial of children. The older part of the cemetery on the Bear Street entrance has been designated as a wild flower area. One of the two small chapels is available to hold funeral services.

The cemetery holds 22 Commonwealth War Graves Commission (CWGC) burials of World War I with a further 20 from World War II, with one being an unidentified airman of the Royal Air Force.

In January 2016 and again in May 2017 mourners were instructed by North Devon Council to remove any tributes from graves that were not touching head stones. The Council said this was necessary because people were breaking rules by placing photographs, messages, lights and other items down the length of graves making it difficult to cut the grass and to reopen graves to bury relatives.

== Gallery ==
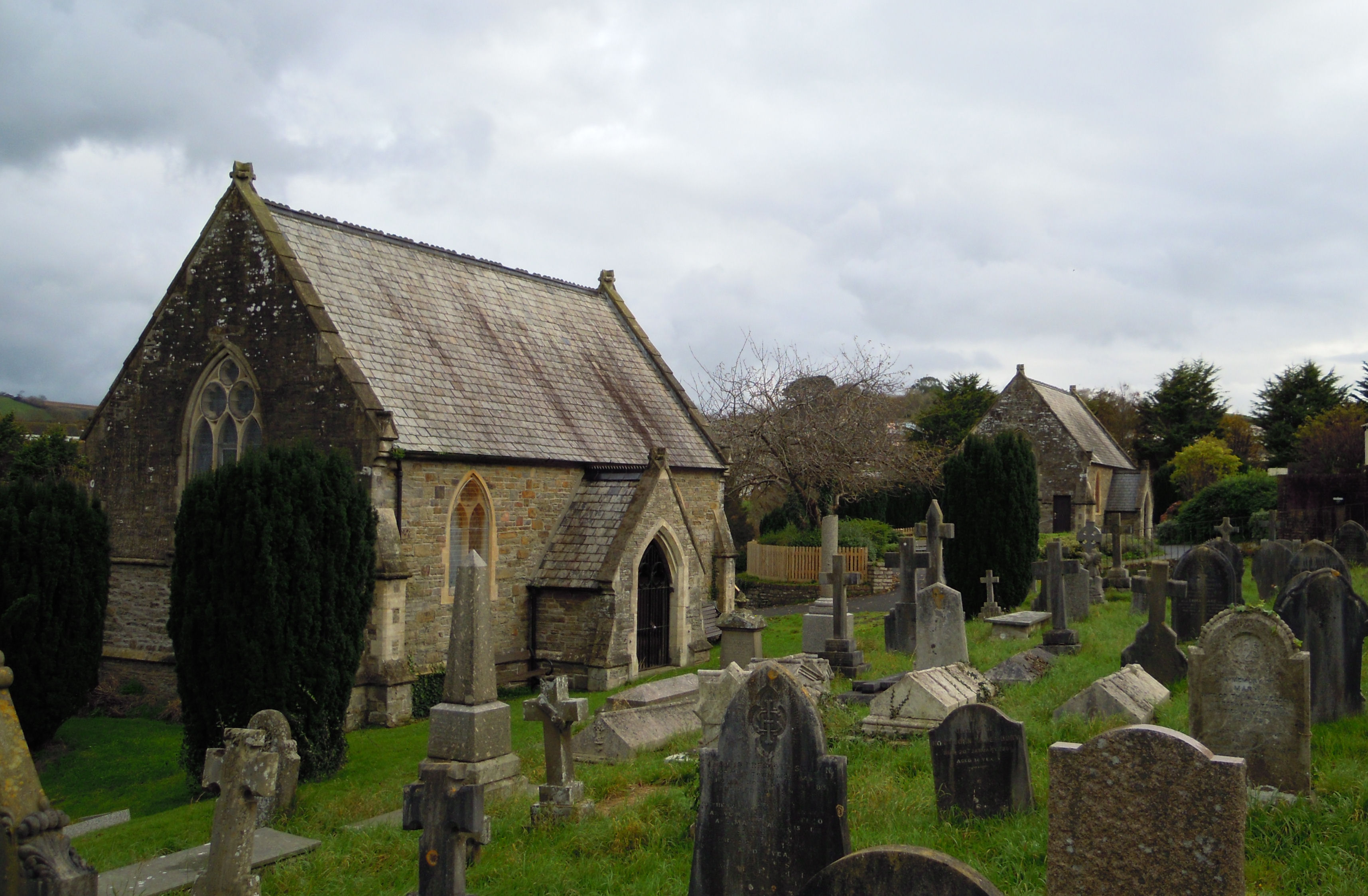
The Twin Chapels

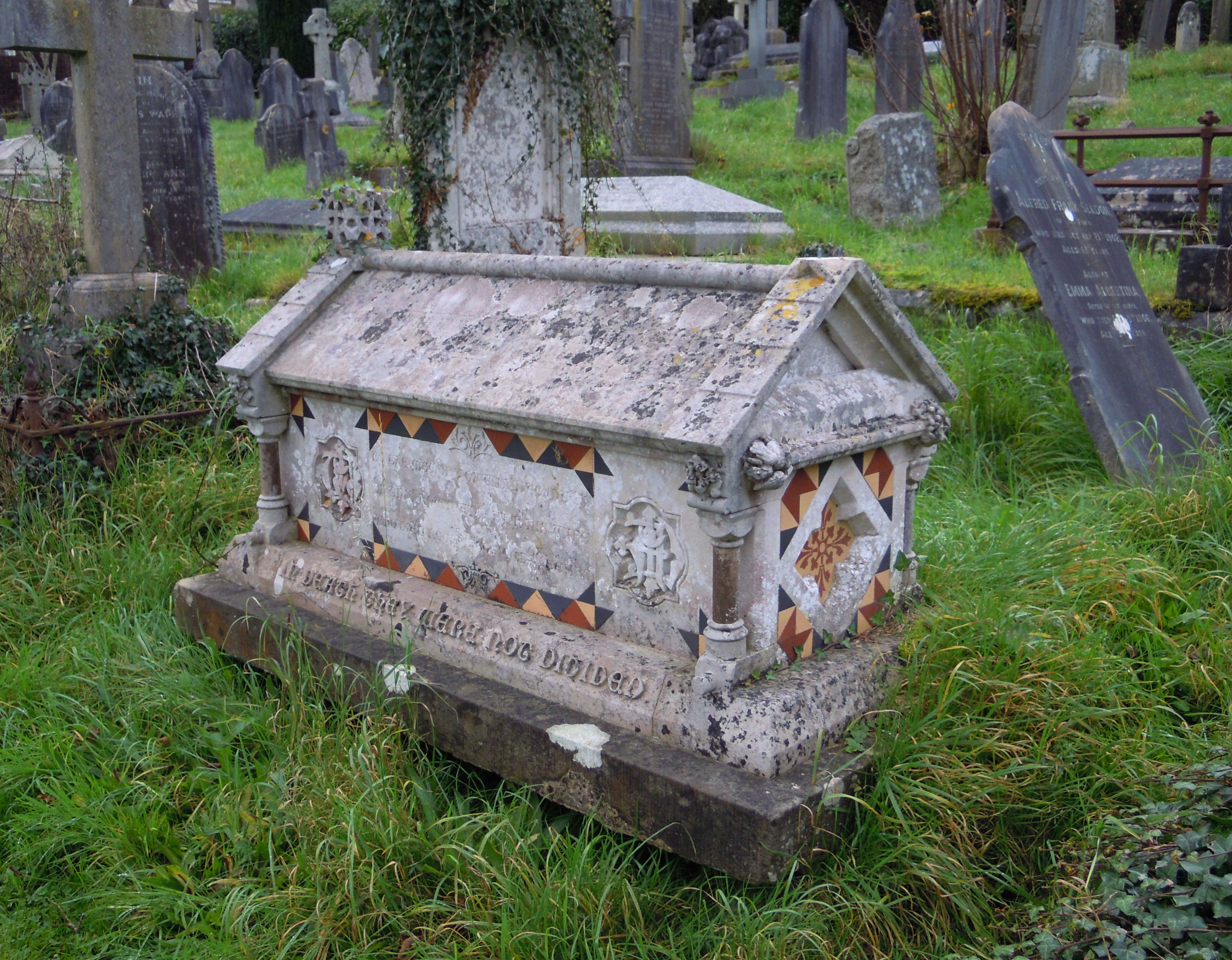
Unusual Victorian tiled chest monument

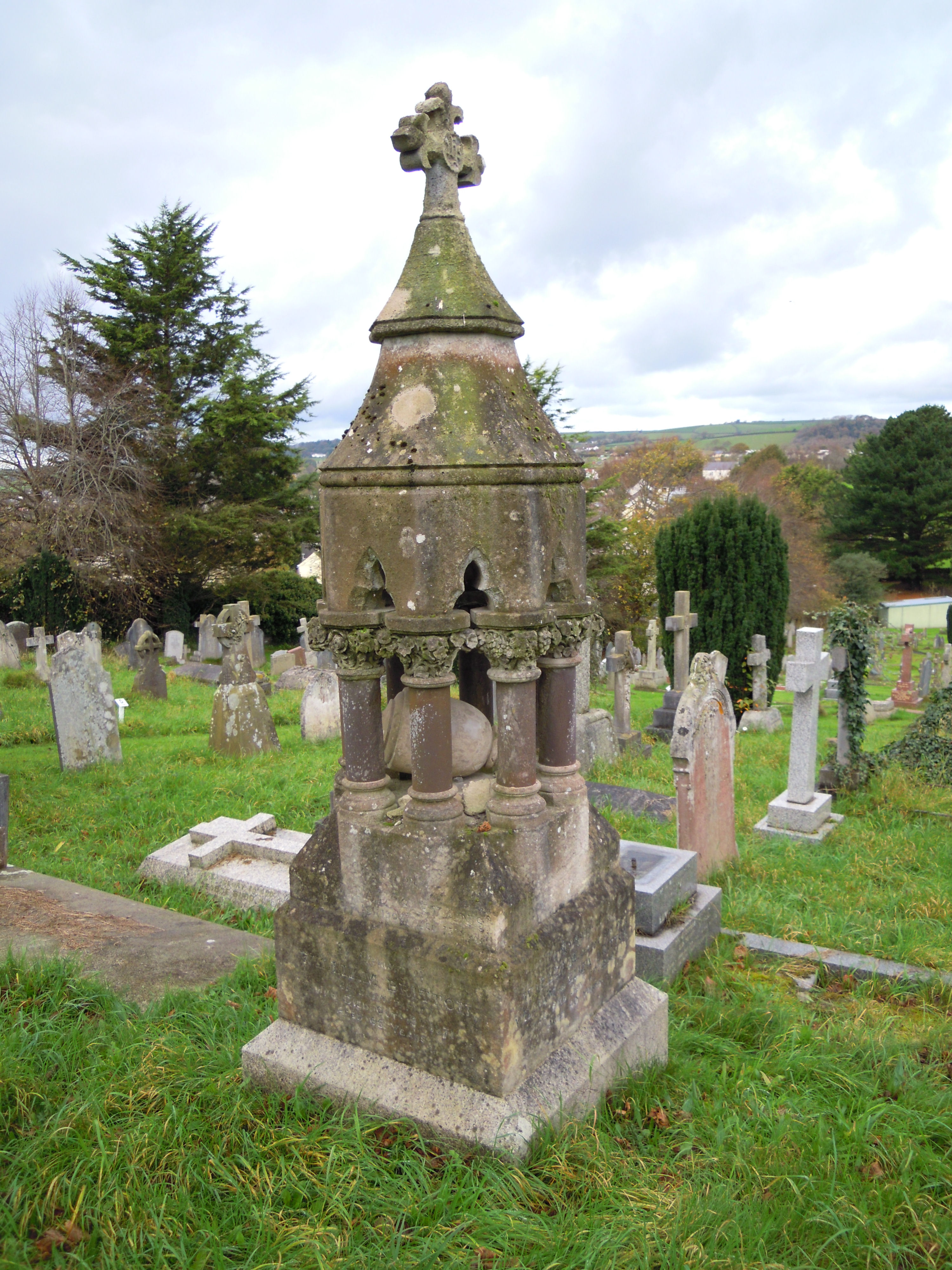
A Victorian tower monument in the cemetery

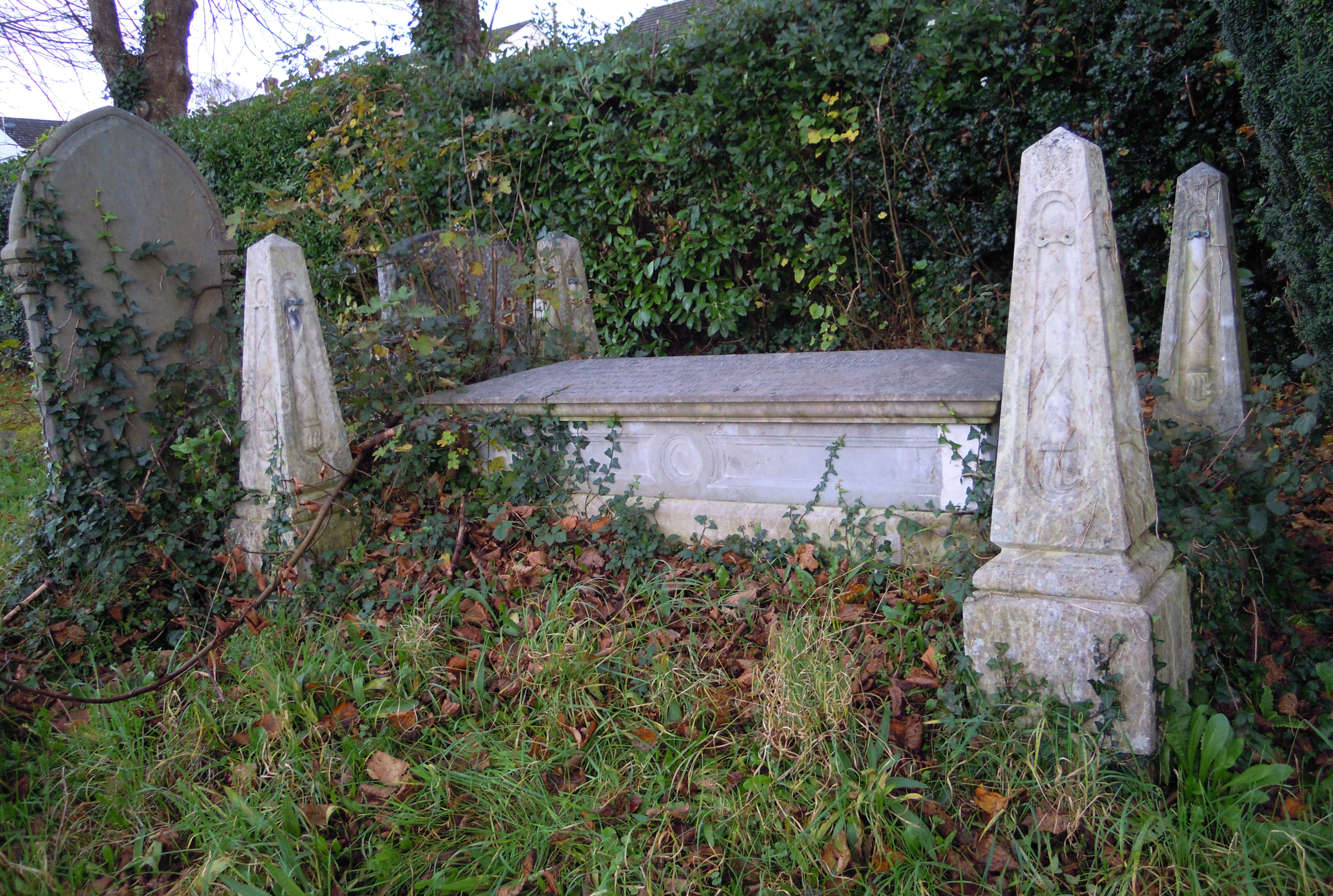
Obelisk memorial to Louisa Crassweller and Alderman Charles Crassweller JP, former Mayor of Portsmouth
