= Philip Baker (provost) =

Philip Baker, D.D. (fl. 1558–1569), was provost of King's College, Cambridge.

== Life ==
Baker was born at Barnstaple, Devonshire, in or about 1523, and educated at Eton College, whence he was elected in 1540 to King's College, Cambridge (B.A., 1544; M.A., 1548; B.D., 1554; D.D., 1562). He was nominated provost of King's College by Queen Elizabeth I in 1558. Baker held several church livings and cathedral appointments; and he was vice-chancellor of the university in 1561–2.

About February 1561-2 he was compelled to resign the rectory of St. Andrew Wardrobe on account of his refusal to subscribe a confession of faith which Grindal, bishop of London, required from all his clergy. Queen Elizabeth occupied the provost's lodge at King's College during her visit to Cambridge in 1564, and Baker was one of the disputants in the divinity act then kept before her majesty. In 1565 some of the fellows of the college complained against Baker to Nicholas Bullingham, bishop of Lincoln, their visitor: the provost was charged with neglect of duty in divers particulars, and with favouring popery and papists. The bishop gave him certain injunctions, which, however, he disregarded:

"By them the provost was enjoined to destroy a great deal of popish stuff, as mass books, couchers, and grails, copes, vestments, candlesticks, crosses, pixes, paxes, and the brazen rood, which the provost did not perform, but preserved them in a secret corner" in the belief that "that which hath been may be again".

In 1569 the fellows again complained of him to Bishop Grindal and Sir William Cecil, chancellor of the university; and ultimately the queen issued a special commission for the general visitation of the college. Thereupon Baker fled to Louvain, 'the great receptacle for the English popish clergy', and was formally deprived of the provostship 22 Feb. 1569–70. About the same period he lost all his other preferments. Thomas Fuller says: 'Even such as dislike his judgment will commend his integrity, that having much of the college money and plate in his custody (and more at his command, aiming to secure, not enrich himself), he faithfully resigned all; yea, carefully sent back the college horses which carried him to the sea side.'

== Death ==
Sources differ as to where and when he died: it has been stated that he died abroad; alternatively, he has been identified as a Philip Baker who died in London in 1590; or again, a collection of Aquinas commentaries in Cambridge University Library, published 1598–1601, is inscribed as a gift to the university from the former proctor Philip Baker.
