= Albert Clock, Barnstaple =

Grade II listed clock tower in Barstaple, England

Coordinates: 51°04′40″N 4°03′30″W

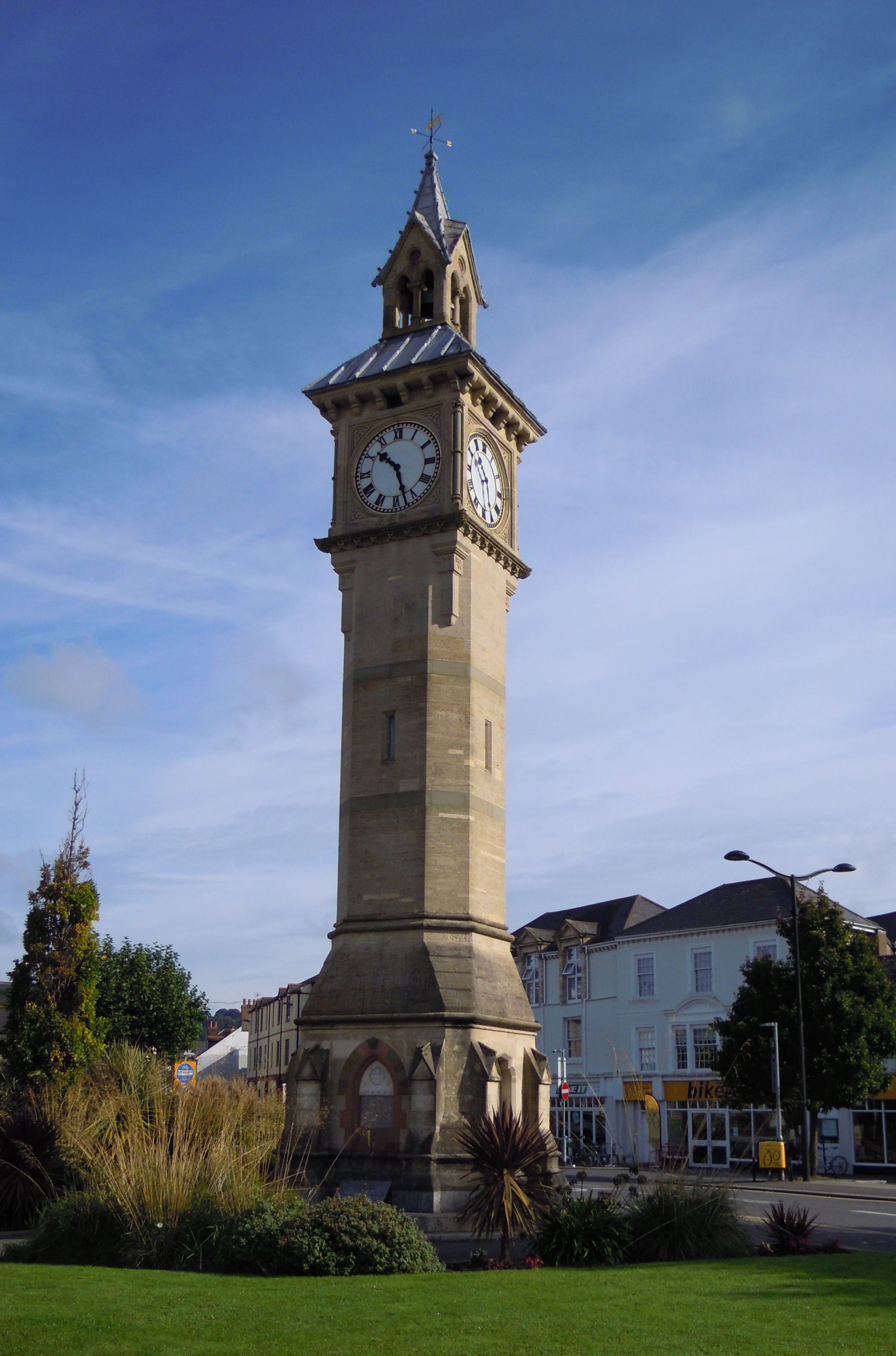
The Albert Clock in The Square in Barnstaple

The Albert Clock is a clocktower memorial in Barnstaple in Devon to Albert, Prince Consort, the husband of Queen Victoria. It has been listed Grade II on the National Heritage List for England since 1988.

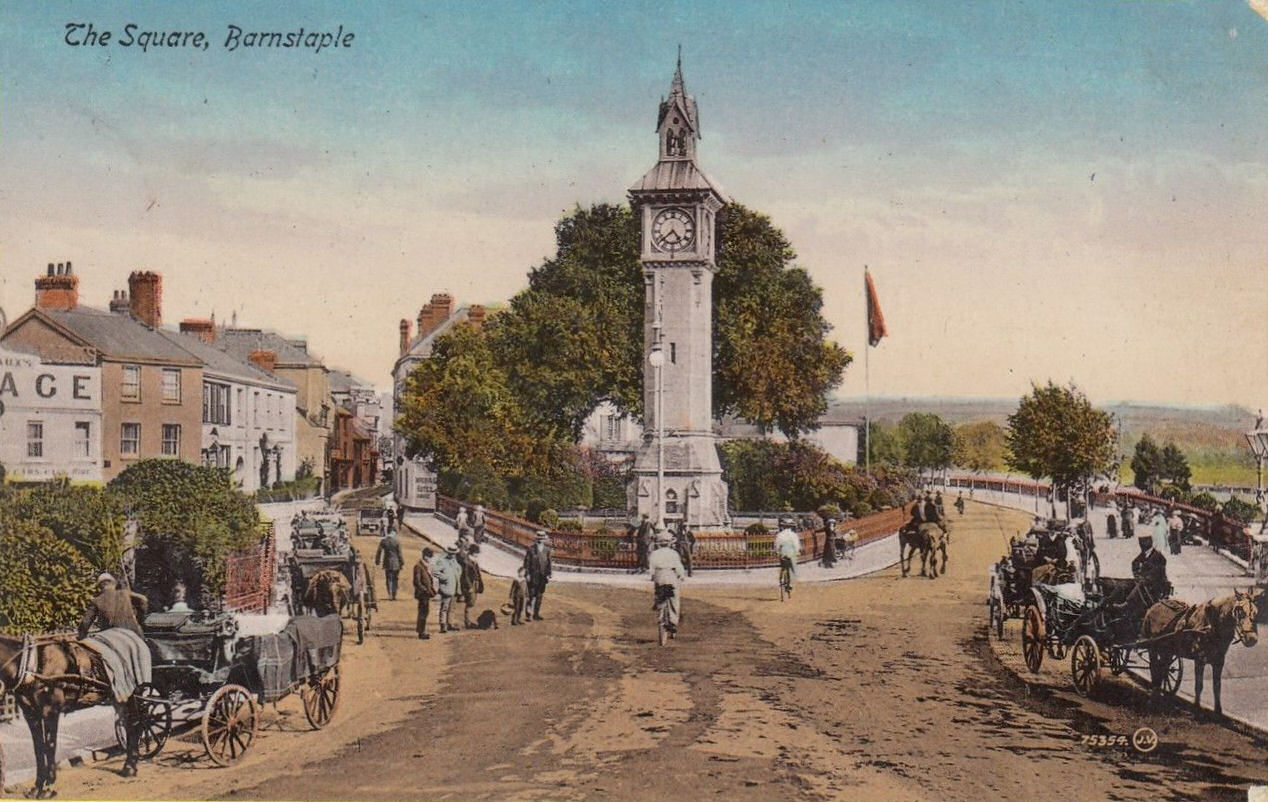
The Albert Clock in about 1905

Located in The Square in Barnstaple, the tower was built in 1862 at the suggestion of the then Mayor of Barnstaple, John Norrington, following the death of Prince Albert in the previous year. The tower was paid for by public subscription with some of the money being raised for the provision of a drinking fountain. The original design was for a tower without a clock.

At its solemn dedication ceremony in 1862 surrounded by local dignitaries the clock's pendulum was set to swing at 11.00 p.m., the hour Prince Albert had died. At the same time the water started to flow from the fountain. As Mayor Norrington, a teetotaller, stepped forward to take the first drink from the fountain a man threw a cupful of what was found to be gin into the water. Norrington was outraged at this indignity to himself, to the Queen and to the memory of Prince Albert. An investigation revealed that the mystery man was John Baker, the landlord of the Mermaid Inn and a local Tory councillor.

Designed by local architect Richard Davie Gould (c1816-1900), the tower is constructed with limestone ashlar with dressings of Devon marble and sandstone together with other local stones and patterned tiles. The tower has an octagonal shaft on a broader octagonal base surmounted with a square and corbelled clock chamber with a clock-dial in each face. The summit consists of a small belfry with a leaded spire and weather-vane. The bell is still inside.

The tower's base has a stair doorway on the South side, while on the North side is a water-trough. At the back of the recess is a panel of coloured tiles with a coat of arms in white marble above it. The drinking fountain, given by Sir William Fraser, MP, has been removed. On the East and West sides are pointed arches of moulded red sandstone with above an arch of different coloured local stones. Within the arches are commemorative marble plaques to Prince Albert.

The Albert Clock Tower was restored in 2009 with funding from Barnstaple Town Council and the Heritage Lottery Fund the architectural technologist was Hamza Syed MICWCI ACIAT.

== Gallery ==
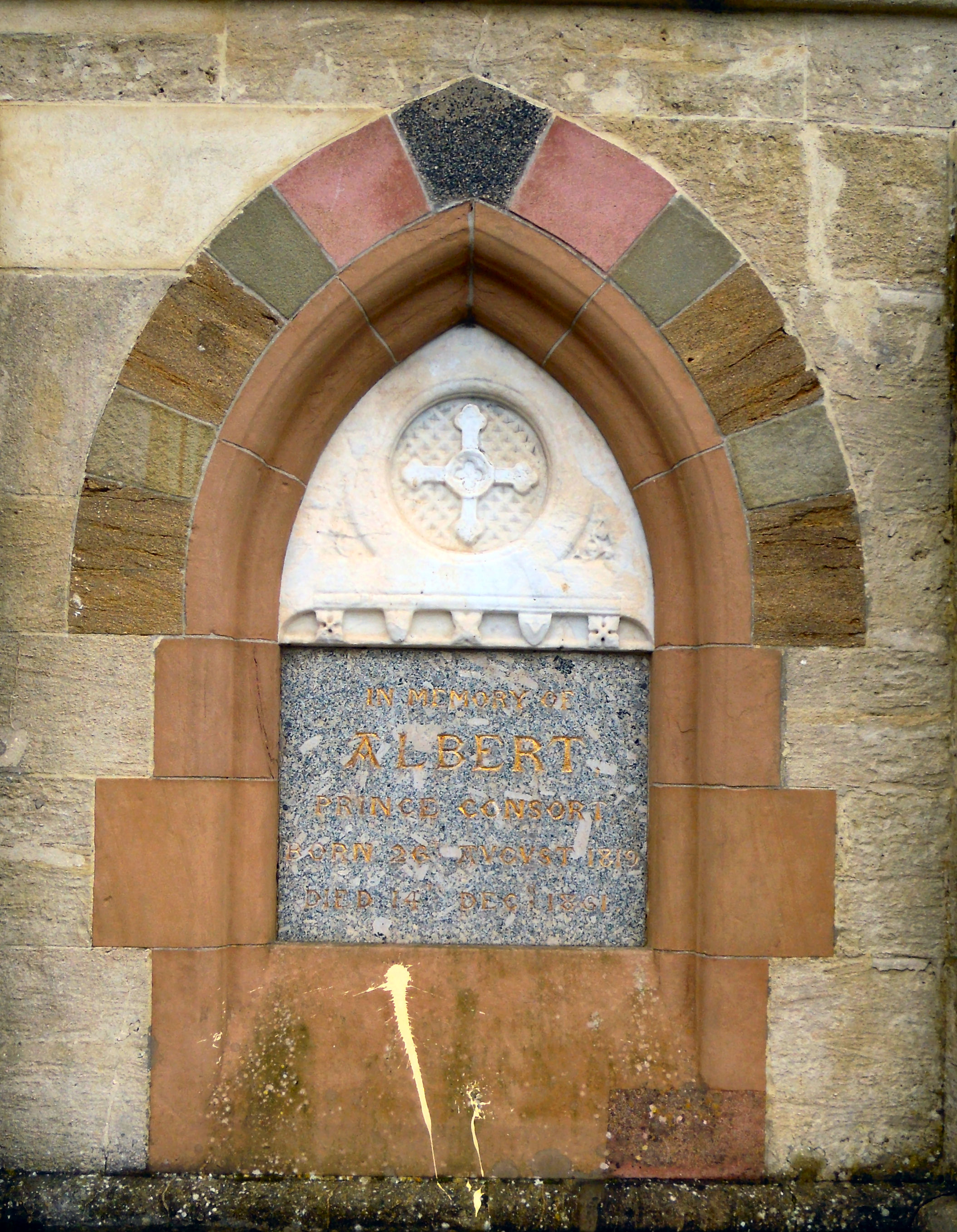
Plaque with dedication to Prince Albert

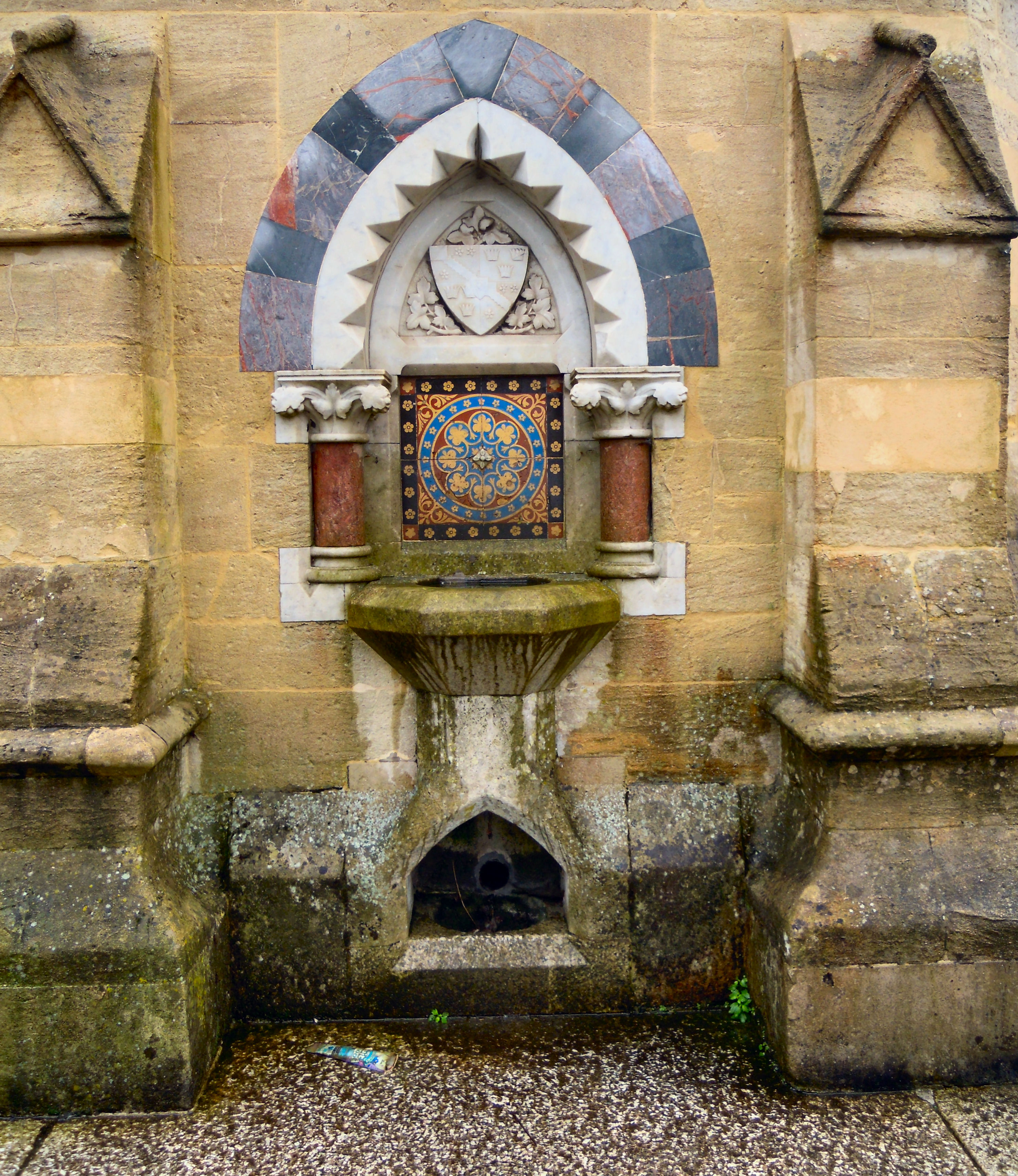
The remains of the drinking fountain

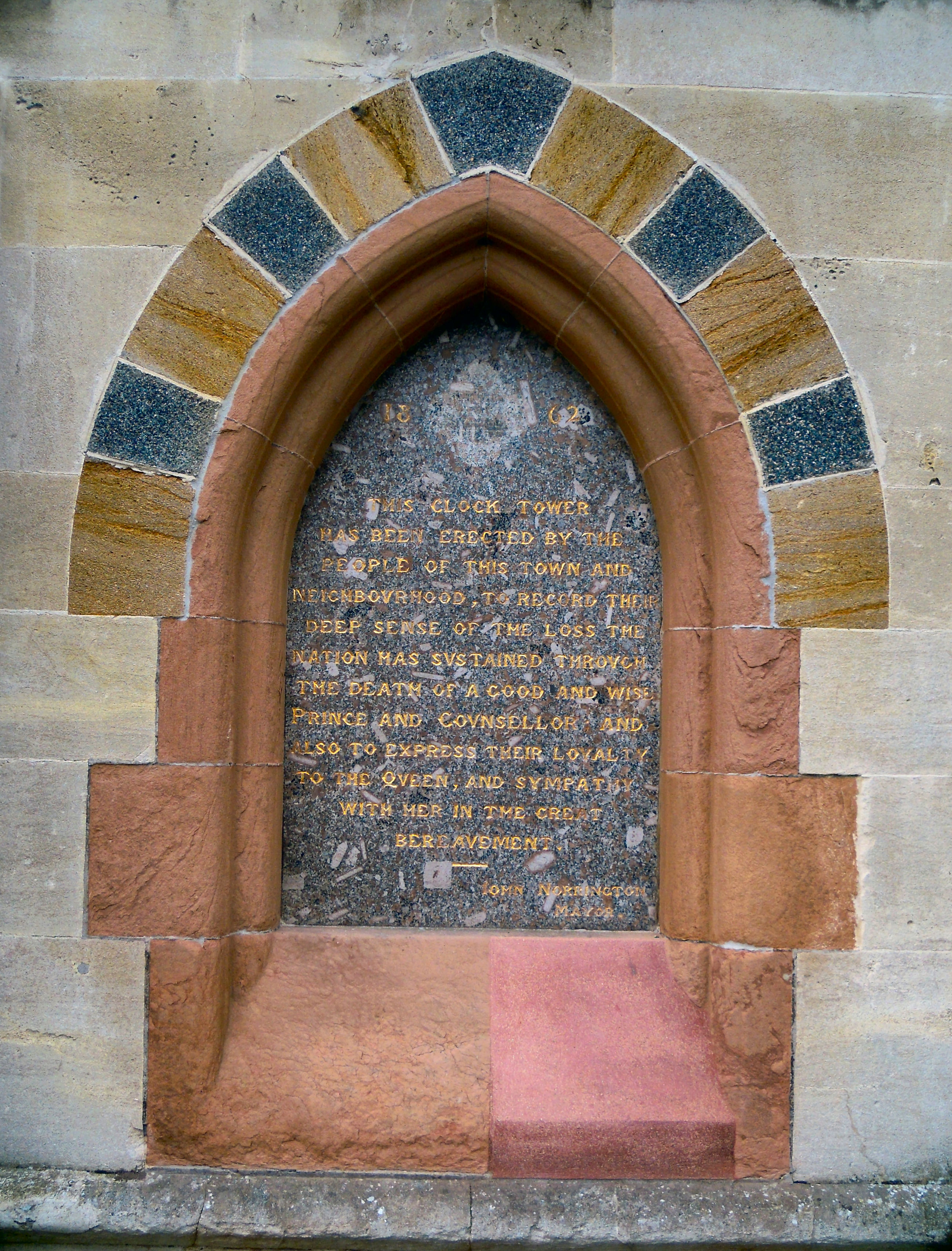
Plaque to Prince Albert
