= Speller Metcalfe =

UK based construction company

- Company type: Private
- Industry: Construction
- Founded: 1995
- Headquarters: Malvern, Worcestershire
- Key people: Steve Speller and Andy Metcalfe
- Website: www.spellermetcalfe.com

Speller Metcalfe is a British construction company. It is headquartered in Malvern, Worcestershire, with locations in Gloucester, Wolverhampton and London.

It was founded by Steve Speller and Andy Metcalfe in 1995. Initially focused on the construction of residential & commercial buildings, it diversified during the 2000s and 2010s and adopted a focus on the West Midlands in response to the Great Recession starting in 2008. During 2011, it started a housing division. In 2019, the company incurred its first operating loss and opted to refocus its operations. The mid-2020s saw steep increases in the firm's recorded profits.

== History ==
Speller Metcalfe is a family-owned business, established in 1995 by a pair of construction surveyors, Steve Speller and Andy Metcalfe - the business is named after them. The company initially focused on the construction of residential & commercial buildings and small projects around Worcestershire and Herefordshire. As the business grew, its work began to span across a more diverse range of sectors including education, automotive, sustainable construction, leisure and healthcare.

Following the onset of the Great Recession in 2008, Speller Metcalfe had to adapt to the changing business conditions, which included focusing on opportunities in the West Midlands. In June 2011, it launched a new division focused on the design and development of housing in both the private and social sectors. Two years later, the firm worked with Western Power Distribution to reduce carbon emissions and increase the sustainability across the latter's estate. In 2015, Speller Metcalfe issued public warnings that several of its suppliers had been recently subjected to attempted invoice fraud.

In December 2016, it was announced that Andy Metcalfe, joint owner and cofounder of the company, would retire in April 2018. In 2019, the company's managing director resigned and a new business plan was formulated that refocused its operations and withdrew it from some sectors. That same year, Speller Metcalfe recorded the first lost in the business' history. Following the collapse of competitor ISG Ltd in 2024, Speller Metcalfe submitted bids to take on some of the projects that had been suspended. In September 2025, the firm recorded a pre-tax profit of £3.4 million, a three-fold year-on-year rise.

== Awards and recognition ==
Speller Metcalfe has

- Considerate Constructors Scheme Silver Awards, 2013
- Green Apple Gold Award, 2013
- Cheltenham Civic Trust Award, 2012
- Gloucester Civic Award, 2012
- LABC award, 2011
- RIBA Award, 2010
- Cheltenham Civic Awards, 2010
- National Considerate Contractor Award, 2010
- LABC West of England Awards, 2009
