= Barnstaple =

Town in Devon, England

Coordinates: 51.08°N 4.06°W

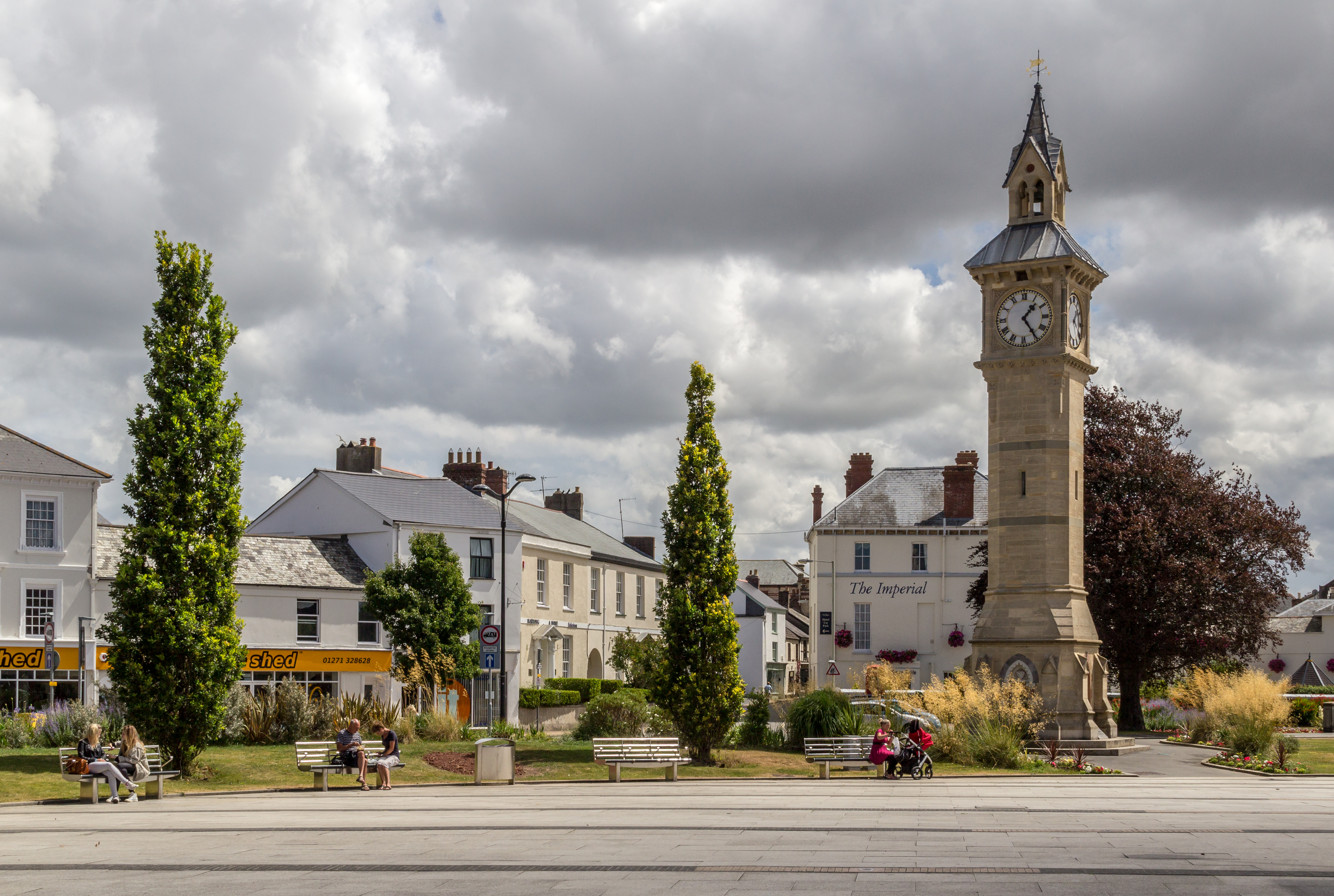
- Barnstaple Clock Tower

- Coat of arms

- Location within Devon
- Population: 23,976 (Parish, 2021); 31,275 (Built up area, 2021)
- OS grid reference: SS5633
- Civil parish: Barnstaple
- District: North Devon
- Shire county: Devon
- Region: South West
- Country: England
- Sovereign state: United Kingdom
- Post town: BARNSTAPLE
- Postcode district: EX31, EX32
- Dialling code: 01271
- Police: Devon and Cornwall
- Fire: Devon and Somerset
- Ambulance: South Western
- UK Parliament: North Devon

Barnstaple (/ˈbɑːrnstəbəl/ or /ˈbɑːrnstəpəl/) is a town and civil parish in the North Devon district of Devon, England. The town lies at the River Taw's lowest crossing point before the Bristol Channel. From the 14th century, it was licensed to export wool from which it earned great wealth. Later it imported Irish wool, but its harbour silted up and other trades developed such as shipbuilding, foundries and sawmills. A Victorian market building survives, with a high glass and timber roof on iron columns.

== Toponymy ==
The name is first recorded in the 10th century and is thought to derive from the Early English bearde, meaning "battle-axe", and stapol, meaning "pillar", i.e. a post or pillar to mark a religious or administrative meeting place. The derivation from staple meaning "market", indicating a market from its foundation, is likely to be incorrect, as the use of staple in that sense first appears in 1423.

Barnstaple was formerly referred to as "Barum", as a contraction of the Latin form of the name ad Barnastapolitum in Latin documents such as the episcopal registers of the Diocese of Exeter. The spelling Barnstable was also used for the town but is now obsolete, although that spelling is retained in America by a town in Massachusetts and its county, which were named after Barnstaple.

Barum is a historical name, which was revived in the Victorian era in several novels. It remains in the names of a football team, a brewery and several businesses, and on numerous milestones. The former Brannam Pottery in Litchdon Street was known for its trademark "Barum" etched on the base of its products.

== History ==
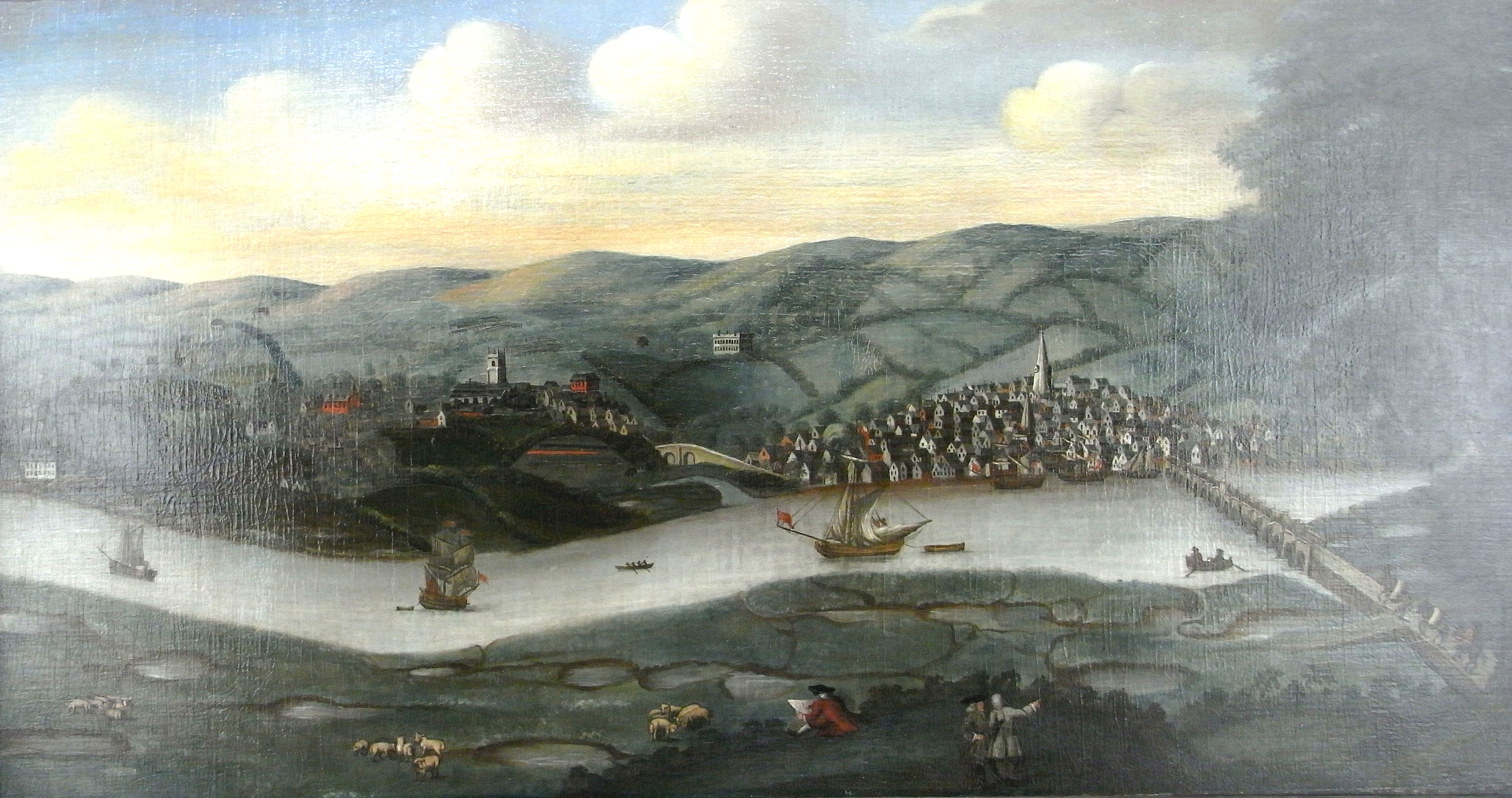
18th-century painting by an unknown artist in the collection of the Museum of Barnstaple and North Devon. Barnstaple (right) and Pilton (left) are seen divided by the River Yeo flowing into the broad River Taw. Right: St Peter's Church, Barnstaple, with spire; Barnstaple Long Bridge (before widening) over River Taw. Left: St Mary's Church, Pilton; Pilton Bridge over the River Yeo.

The earliest local settlement was probably at Pilton by the River Yeo, now a northern suburb. Pilton is recorded in the Burghal Hidage (c. 917) as a burh founded by Alfred the Great, and may have undergone a Viking attack in 893, but by the later 10th-century Barnstaple had taken over its local defence. It had a mint before the Norman Conquest.

The feudal barony of Barnstaple had its caput at Barnstaple Castle, granted by William the Conqueror to Geoffrey de Montbray, who appears as its holder in the 1086 Domesday Book. The barony fell to the Crown in 1095 after Montbray rebelled against William II. He transferred the barony to Juhel de Totnes, a feudal baron of Totnes. By 1107 Juhel had founded Totnes Priory and then Barnstaple Priory, of the Cluniac order, dedicated to St Mary Magdalene. After Juhel's son died intestate, the barony was split between the de Braose and Tracy families, before reuniting under Henry de Tracy. It then passed through several families, before ending in the hands of Margaret Beaufort (died 1509), mother of King Henry VII.

A market is first recorded in 1274. The town's wealth in the Middle Ages rested on being a Port of the Staple licensed to export wool. It had an early merchant guild of St Nicholas. In the early 14th century it was Devon's third richest town after Exeter and Plymouth, and its largest textile centre outside Exeter until about 1600. The wool trade was aided by its port, from which five ships were contributed to a force sent to fight the Spanish Armada in 1588. Barnstaple was one of the "privileged ports" of the Spanish Company, (established 1577), whose armorials appear on two mural monuments to 17th-century merchants: Richard Beaple (died 1643), three times Mayor, and Richard Ferris (Mayor in 1632), who with Alexander Horwood received a payment from the Corporation of Barnstaple in 1630 for "riding to Exeter about the Spanish Company." in St Peter's Church, and on the decorated plaster ceiling of the old Golden Lion Inn, Boutport Street, now a restaurant beside the Royal and Fortescue Hotel. (Note: The royal charter of 1605 re-establishing the Spanish Company names several hundred founding members from named English ports, the "merchants of Barnstaple" being William Gay, John Salisbury, John Darracott, John Mewles, George Gay, Richard Dodderidge, James Beaple, Nicholas Downe, James Downe, Robert Dodderidge, Richard Beaple and Pentecost Dodderidge. Richard Dodderidge and James Beaple were named amongst the "first and present assistants and chief councillors of the fellowship".)

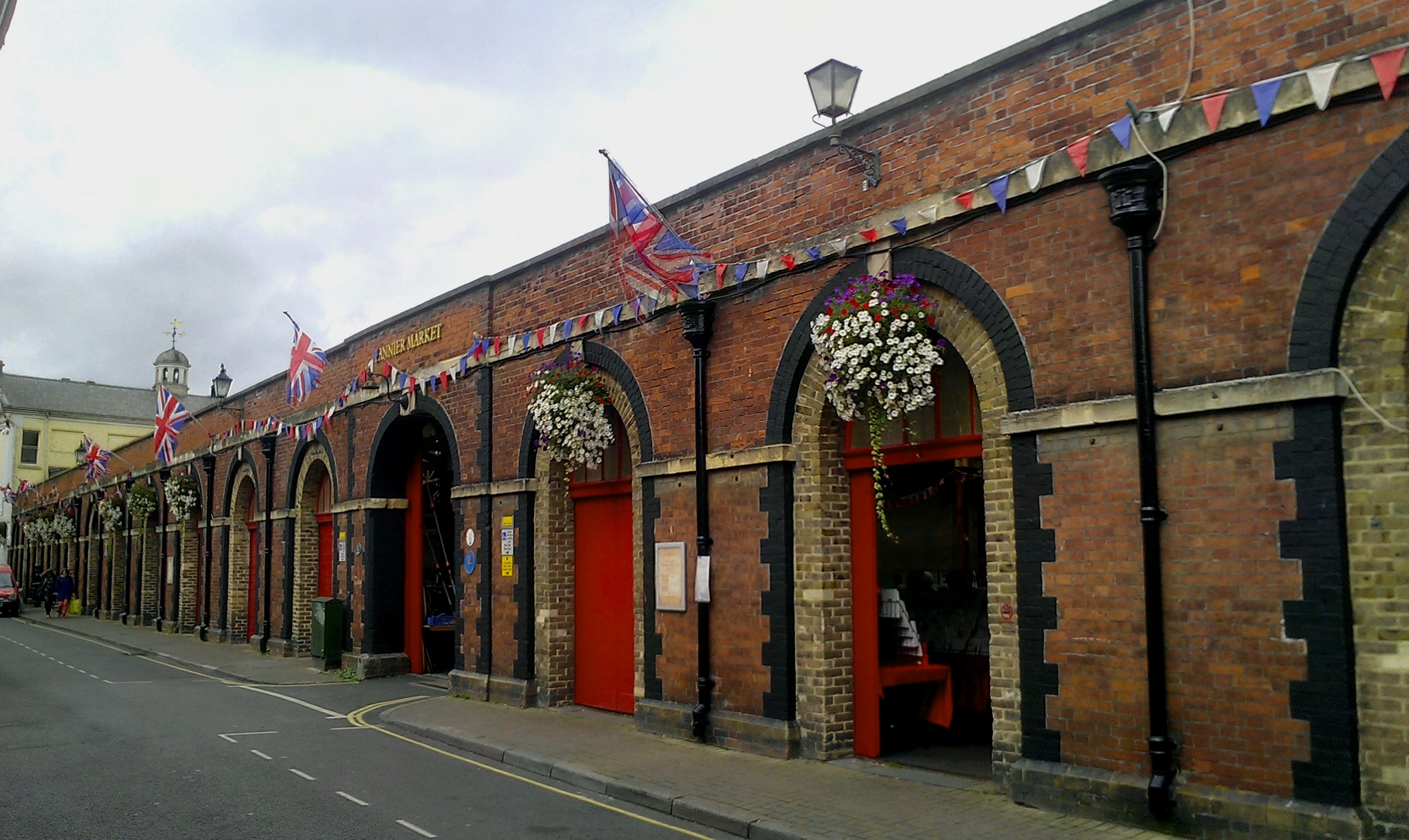
The exterior of the Pannier Market, built in the mid-19th century

The town benefited from rising trade with America in the 16th and 17th centuries, for the benefit of wealthy merchants who built impressive town houses. Some of these survive behind more recent frontages, for instance No. 62 Boutport Street, said to have one of the best plaster ceilings in Devon. The merchants also built almshouses, including Penrose's, and backed their legacy with elaborate family monuments inside the church.

By the 18th century, Barnstaple had ceased to be a woollen manufacturing town. Its output was replaced from Ireland, for which it was the main landing place; the raw materials were then taken by land to clothmaking towns in mid and east-Devon, such as Tiverton and Honiton. However, the harbour was silting up. As early as c. 1630 Tristram Risdon reported, "It hardly beareth small vessels." Bideford, lower down the estuary and benefiting from the scouring by the fast-flowing River Torridge, gradually took over the trade.

Although Barnstaple's trade in 1680–1730 was surpassed by Bideford's, it retained economic importance into the early 20th century, manufacturing lace, gloves, sail-cloth and fishing-nets, with extensive potteries, tanneries, sawmills and foundries, and some shipbuilding still carried on. The Bear Street drill hall dates from the early 19th century.

Between the 1930s and the 1950s the urban area grew to incorporate the villages of Pilton, Newport, and Roundswell through ribbon development.

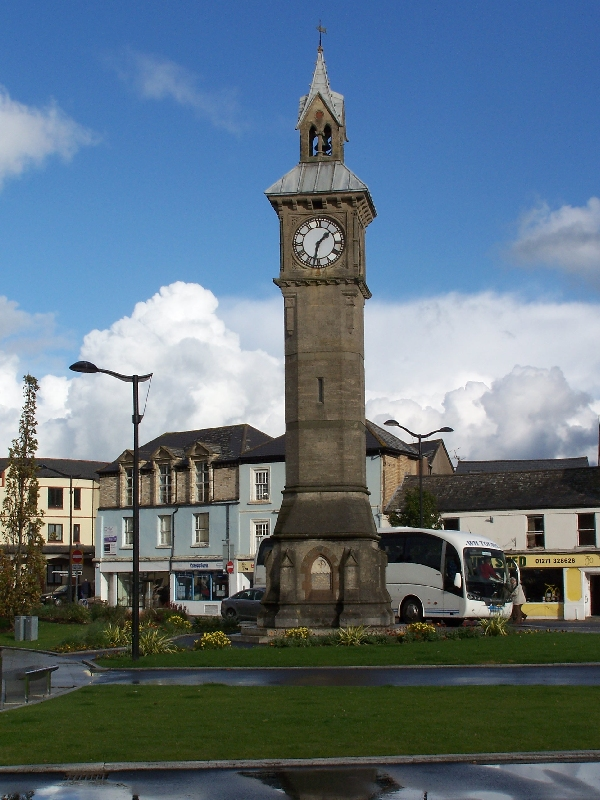
Barnstaple Clock Tower, erected in 1862 as a memorial to Prince Albert

== Governance ==
Barnstaple Town Council

Type
- Type: Civil parish

Leadership
- Mayor: Janet Coates, Liberal Democrats
- Deputy Mayor: Joanna Orange, Liberal Democrats

Structure
- Seats: 23
- Political groups: Liberal Democrats (22) Labour Party (1)
- Salary: None

Elections
- Voting system: First-past-the-post

Meeting place
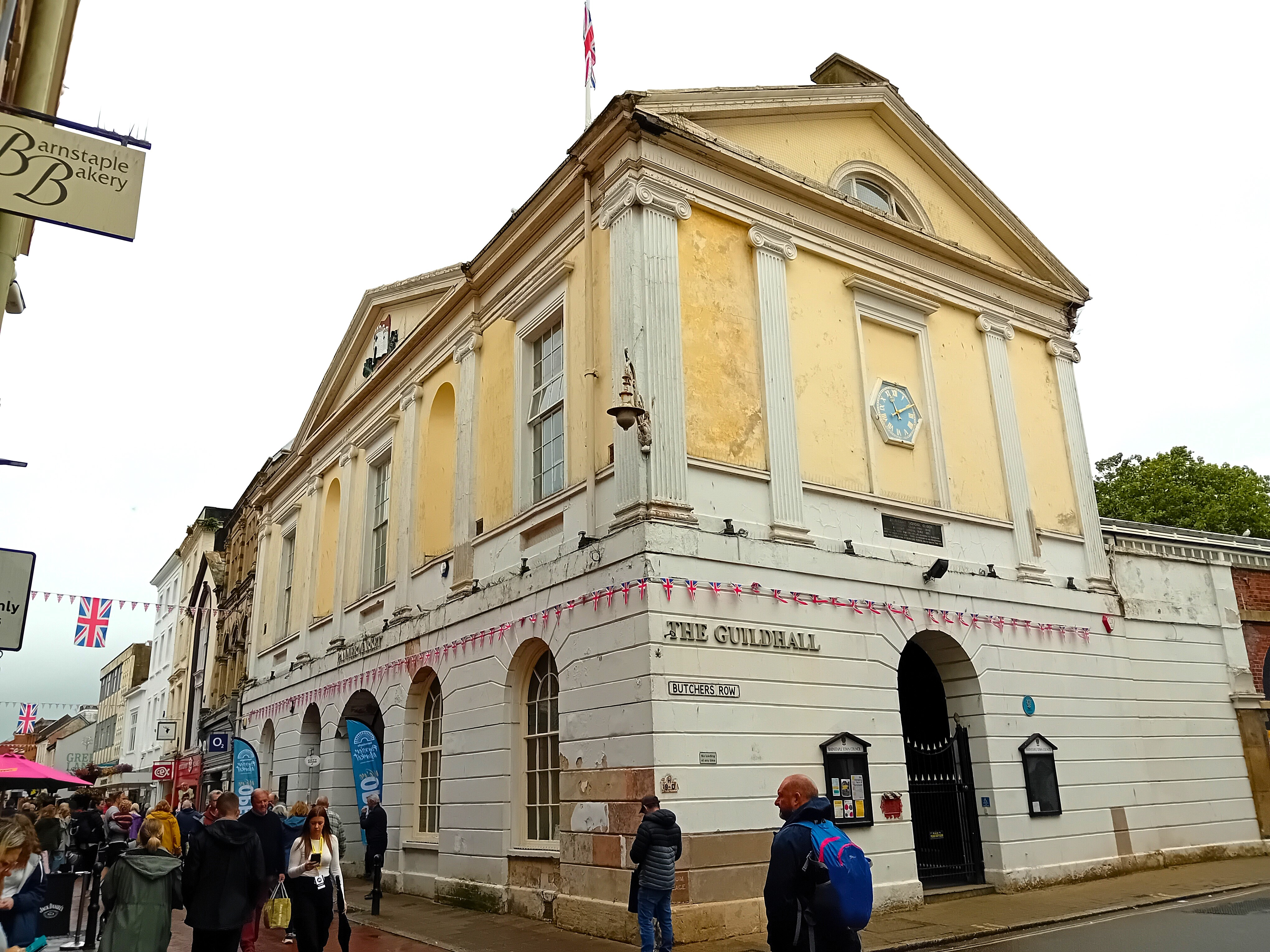
- Guildhall, Butchers Row, Barnstaple, EX31 1BW
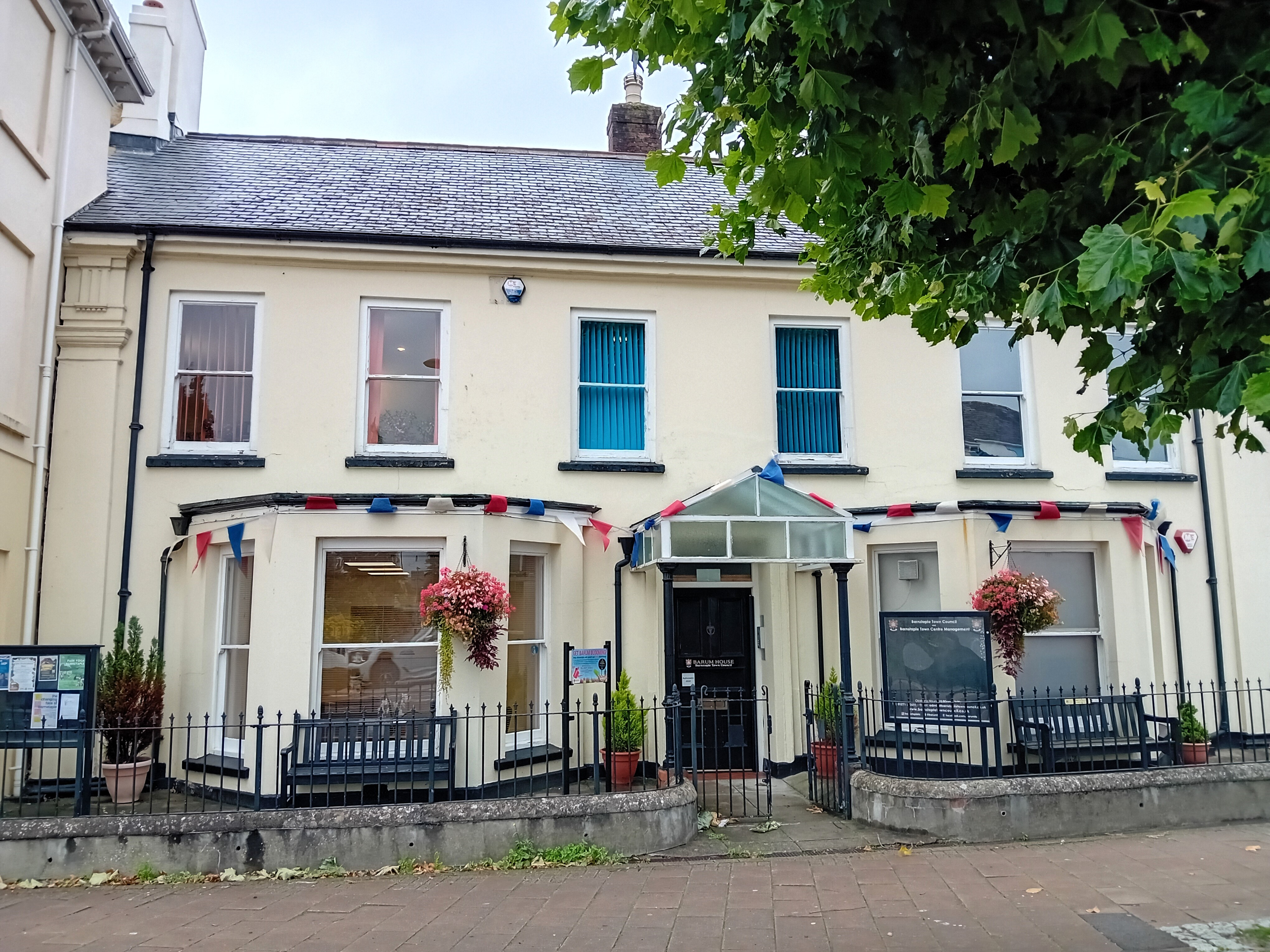
- Barum House, The Square, Barnstaple, EX32 8LS

Website
- barnstapletowncouncil.gov.uk

There are three tiers of local government covering Barnstaple, at parish (town), district and county level: Barnstaple Town Council, North Devon Council (based just outside Barnstaple) and Devon County Council (based in Exeter). Barnstaple Town Council meets at the Guildhall on High Street and has its offices at Barum House on The Square.

=== Administrative history ===
Barnstaple was an ancient borough. Its early status as a borough was ambiguous; in 1340 the town's guild claimed it had been incorporated in 930 by King Athelstan in a charter which had since been lost. The town was described as a borough in the Domesday Book of 1086, and from at least 1210 the town was being run by a guild which appointed a mayor. The claim in 1340 was made as part of a petition to Edward III seeking a new charter with additional powers. This was resisted by the lord of the feudal barony of Barnstaple. Following an inquisition ad quod damnum it was ruled that the town was in fact a lower status mesne borough answerable to the lord, rather than a free borough responsible directly to the monarch. The mayor was therefore not recognised as such by the monarch, but was deemed to be merely a bailiff of the lord. The guild made several other unsuccessful attempts to secure a charter from the king throughout the fourteenth and fifteenth centuries, including seeking confirmation of rights supposedly conferred by charters from Henry II and subsequent monarchs, but those charters were forgeries, copied from Exeter's charters.

The town eventually secured a charter of incorporation from Mary I in 1557. The council built the Guildhall on High Street in 1828 to serve as its meeting place. It was reformed to become a municipal borough in 1836, governed by a corporate body officially called the "mayor, aldermen and burgesses of the borough of Barnstaple", but generally known as the corporation or town council. The borough boundaries, which had previously been identical to the parish of Barnstaple, were enlarged at the same time to include part of the parish of Pilton (including the village itself) and the Newport area from the parish of Bishop's Tawton. The borough was further enlarged in 1899 to take in the Rolle's Quay area from Pilton and an area on the west bank of the River Taw (including Barnstaple Junction railway station) which had previously been in the parish of Tawstock.

The town council moved its offices to Castle House in the grounds of the castle in 1927, which in turn was replaced by a new Civic Centre on North Walk in 1969. The borough of Barnstaple was abolished in 1974 under the Local Government Act 1972, with the area merging with Barnstaple Rural District, South Molton Rural District and the urban districts of Ilfracombe and Lynton to become the new district of North Devon. A successor parish was created covering the area of the former borough, with its council taking the name Barnstaple Town Council. The Civic Centre passed to North Devon Council, whilst the town council was initially based at the Guildhall. In 1993 the town council acquired Barum House on The Square to serve as its offices, but continues to use the Guildhall for meetings.

=== Parliamentary status ===
From 1295 the Borough of Barnstaple had two members in the House of Commons until 1885, when this was reduced to one. The constituency was replaced for the 1950 general election by the large modern constituency of North Devon, held by Nick Harvey MP of the Liberal Democrats from 1992 until 2015, when Peter Heaton-Jones of the Conservative Party was elected and re-elected in 2017. Between 2019 and 2024 the MP was the Conservative Selaine Saxby. Since 2024 the MP has been the Liberal Democrat Ian Roome.

== Geography ==
Barnstaple is the largest town in North Devon. It lies 68 miles (109 km) west-south-west of Bristol, 50 miles (80 km) north of Plymouth and 34 miles (55 km) north-west of the county town and city of Exeter. It was founded at the lowest crossing point of the River Taw, where its estuary starts to widen, about 7 miles (11 km) inland from Barnstaple Bay in the Bristol Channel. On the north side, the Taw is joined by the River Yeo, which rises on Berry Down near Combe Martin.

Most of the town lies on the east bank of the estuary, connected to the west by the ancient Barnstaple Long Bridge, with 16 arches. The town's early medieval layout still appears from the street plan and street names, with Boutport Street ("About the Port") following the curved line of a ditch outside the town walls. The area of medieval shipbuilding and repair is still called The Strand, an early word for shore.

=== Climate ===
Barnstaple has cool wet winters and mild wet summers. Mean high temperatures range from 9 C (48 F) in January to 21 C (70 F) in July. The record high is 34 C (94 F) and the record low −9 C (16 F). October is the wettest month with 103 mm (4.1 in) of rain. The mean annual rainfall is 862 mm (33.9 in), with rain on 138 days.

Climate data for Chivenor (Note: Weather station is located 4.0 miles (6.4 km) from the Barnstaple town centre.) (1991–2020 normals, extremes 1984–present)
Month	Jan	Feb	Mar	Apr	May	Jun	Jul	Aug	Sep	Oct	Nov	Dec	Year
Record high °C (°F)	15.3 (59.5)	18.9 (66.0)	21.5 (70.7)	25.1 (77.2)	31.3 (88.3)	35.1 (95.2)	34.8 (94.6)	34.3 (93.7)	29.5 (85.1)	26.4 (79.5)	18.2 (64.8)	17.7 (63.9)	35.1 (95.2)
Mean daily maximum °C (°F)	9.1 (48.4)	9.4 (48.9)	11.2 (52.2)	13.7 (56.7)	16.5 (61.7)	19.0 (66.2)	20.5 (68.9)	20.5 (68.9)	18.8 (65.8)	15.4 (59.7)	12.1 (53.8)	9.7 (49.5)	14.7 (58.5)
Daily mean °C (°F)	6.4 (43.5)	6.5 (43.7)	7.8 (46.0)	9.8 (49.6)	12.6 (54.7)	15.2 (59.4)	16.9 (62.4)	17.0 (62.6)	15.2 (59.4)	12.3 (54.1)	9.2 (48.6)	6.9 (44.4)	11.3 (52.4)
Mean daily minimum °C (°F)	3.7 (38.7)	3.5 (38.3)	4.4 (39.9)	5.9 (42.6)	8.6 (47.5)	11.4 (52.5)	13.3 (55.9)	13.4 (56.1)	11.5 (52.7)	9.2 (48.6)	6.2 (43.2)	4.1 (39.4)	8.0 (46.4)
Record low °C (°F)	−10.4 (13.3)	−9.0 (15.8)	−5.0 (23.0)	−3.0 (26.6)	0.0 (32.0)	1.6 (34.9)	5.6 (42.1)	6.0 (42.8)	1.9 (35.4)	−3.1 (26.4)	−7.0 (19.4)	−9.3 (15.3)	−10.4 (13.3)
Average precipitation mm (inches)	90.1 (3.55)	69.7 (2.74)	59.5 (2.34)	55.3 (2.18)	54.0 (2.13)	64.8 (2.55)	73.7 (2.90)	77.1 (3.04)	69.9 (2.75)	107.0 (4.21)	106.4 (4.19)	107.1 (4.22)	934.4 (36.79)
Average precipitation days (≥ 1.0 mm)	15.2	12.5	11.7	10.4	9.8	10.1	10.5	12.2	11.5	15.2	16.7	16.1	151.8
Mean monthly sunshine hours	59.7	79.3	136.2	194.5	219.6	209.6	203.1	189.8	153.8	107.5	64.2	51.8	1,669.3
Source 1: Met Office
Source 2: Starlings Roost Weather

== Demography ==
Barnstaple parish population in the 1801 census was 3,748, in 1901, 9,698, and in 2001, 22,497.

In 2011, the racial make-up was:

- White British: 97.9%
- White Irish: 0.3%
- Other White: 2.6%
- Mixed race: 2.2%
- Asian: 1.6%
- Black: 1.3%
- Other: 0.1%

As a major town, Barnstaple has a similar ethnic make-up to other south-west towns such as Truro and Cullompton. It is more diverse than the North Devon district (95.9% White British) and Devon as a whole (94.2% White British).

== Economy ==
North Devon is some distance from Britain's traditional areas of industrial activity and population. In the late 1970s it gained several industrial firms due to the availability of central government grants for opening factories and operating them on low or zero levels of local taxation. This was scarcely successful, with few lasting beyond the few years that grants were available. One success was the manufacturing of generic medicines by Cox Pharmaceuticals (now branded Allergan), which moved in 1980 from a site in Brighton, Sussex. A lasting effect on the town has been the development and expansion of industrial estates at Seven Brethren, Whiddon Valley and Pottington.

Whilst the 1989 opening of the improved A361 connection to the motorway network assisted trade in ways such as weekend tourism, it was detrimental to some distribution businesses. These had previously seen the town as a base for local distribution, a need removed when travelling time to the M5 motorway was roughly halved.

With Barnstaple as the main shopping area for North Devon, retail work contributes to the economy. There are chain stores in the town centre and in the Roundswell Business Park, on the western fringe of the town. Multi-million pound redevelopment round the former Leaderflush Shapland works at Anchorwood Bank is creating a conservation area near the River Taw, hundreds of new homes, a retail area of shops, restaurants and leisure facilities.

By far the largest employer in the region is local and central government, particularly the Royal Marines Base Chivenor, 3 miles (5 km) west of the town, and North Devon District Hospital, 1 mile (1.6 km) to the north.

In 2005 unemployment in North Devon was 1.8–2.4 per cent, while median per capita wage for North Devon was 73 per cent of the UK national average. The level of work in the informal or casual sector is high, partly during seasonal tourism. By 2018 unemployment in North Devon had fallen from a 2010 high to 1.2 per cent, while median weekly full-time pay stood at £440 per week and average housing prices at £230,000. The number of businesses registered has risen by 370 since 2010 to 4,895. The year 2018 also saw government investment through Coastal Community grants and Housing Infrastructure funds £83 million to upgrade the North Devon Link Road.

== Twin towns and sister cities ==
Barnstaple is twinned with:

- Barnstable, Massachusetts, United States
- Uelzen, Germany
- Trouville-sur-Mer, France
- Susa, Piedmont, Italy
- Harstad, Norway

== Landmarks ==
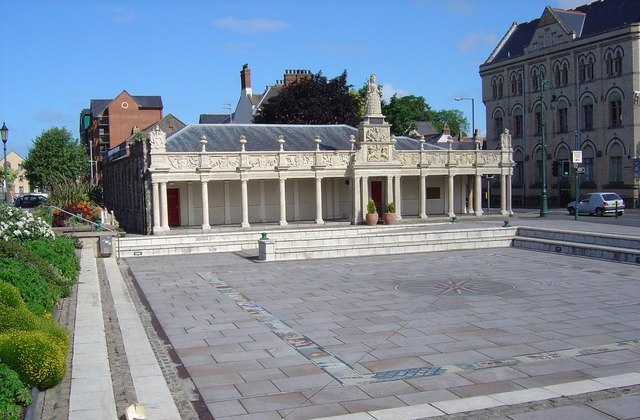
Queen Anne's Walk, formerly the Mercantile Exchange, c. 1708, with the town's main quay to the left. The statue of Queen Anne was given in 1708 by the MP Robert Rolle (died 1710) of Stevenstone

Barnstaple has an eclectic mix of architectural styles, with the 19th century predominant, despite remnants of early buildings and several early plaster ceilings. St Anne's Chapel in the central churchyard can be seen as the most important ancient building to survive. Queen Anne's Walk was erected in about 1708 as a mercantile exchange. The Georgian Guildhall is also of interest, as is the Pannier Market beneath it. The museum has an "arts and crafts" appearance with tessellated floors and locally made staircase and decorative fireplaces.

=== Barnstaple Castle ===
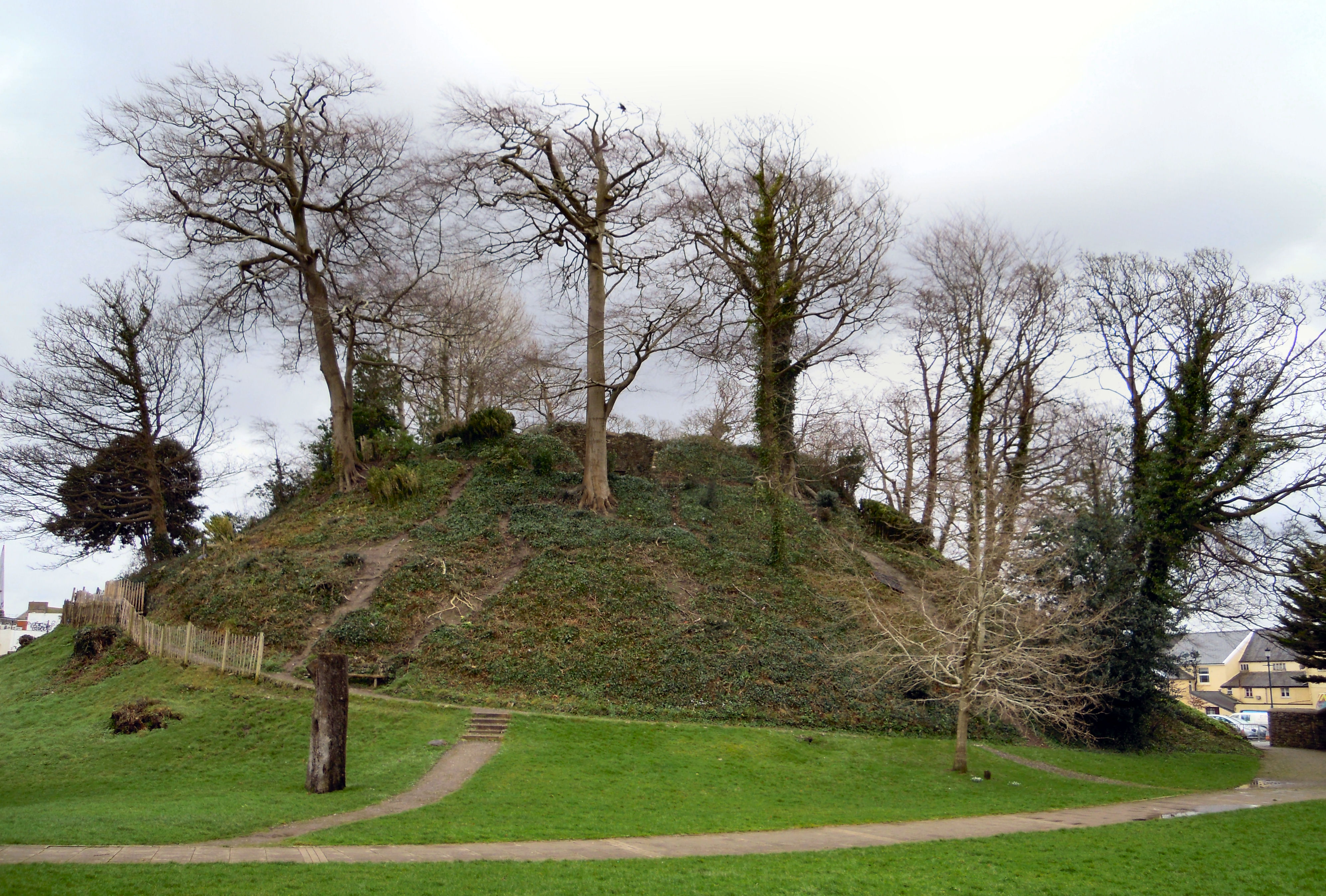
Barnstaple Castle mound next to the current day public library and car park

Barnstaple Castle, founded in the 11th or 12th century and first mentioned in the 12th century, may derive from Juhel (Joel) of Totnes in the early 12th century. King Stephen granted the castle to Henry de Tracy, a supporter of his. In the 12th century, stone buildings were built over the motte, possibly during Henry de Tracy's tenure. The castle descended through his family to another Henry de Tracy, who held the castle in 1228 when Henry III ordered the Sheriff of Devon to make sure its walls did not exceed 10 feet (3.0 m) in height. By the death of the last Henry de Tracey in 1274, the castle had begun to decay. An inquisition of 1281 found that building materials had been removed from the castle without permission; by 1326 it was a ruin. Part of the castle walls blew down in a storm in 1601.

The Neo-Gothic Manor of Tawstock, originally Tawstock House, is two miles south of Barnstaple. It replaced an earlier Tudor mansion, built in 1574 but lost to a fire in 1787.

=== St Anne's Chapel ===
The Grade II listed St Anne's Chapel was restored in 2012 and is used as a community centre that can accommodate 60 people. It was an ancient Gothic chantry chapel, whose assets were acquired by the Mayor of Barnstaple and others in 1585, some time after the Dissolution of the Monasteries. A deed of feoffment dated 1 November 1585 exists in the George Grant Francis collection in Cardiff.

=== Pannier Market and Butchers' Row ===
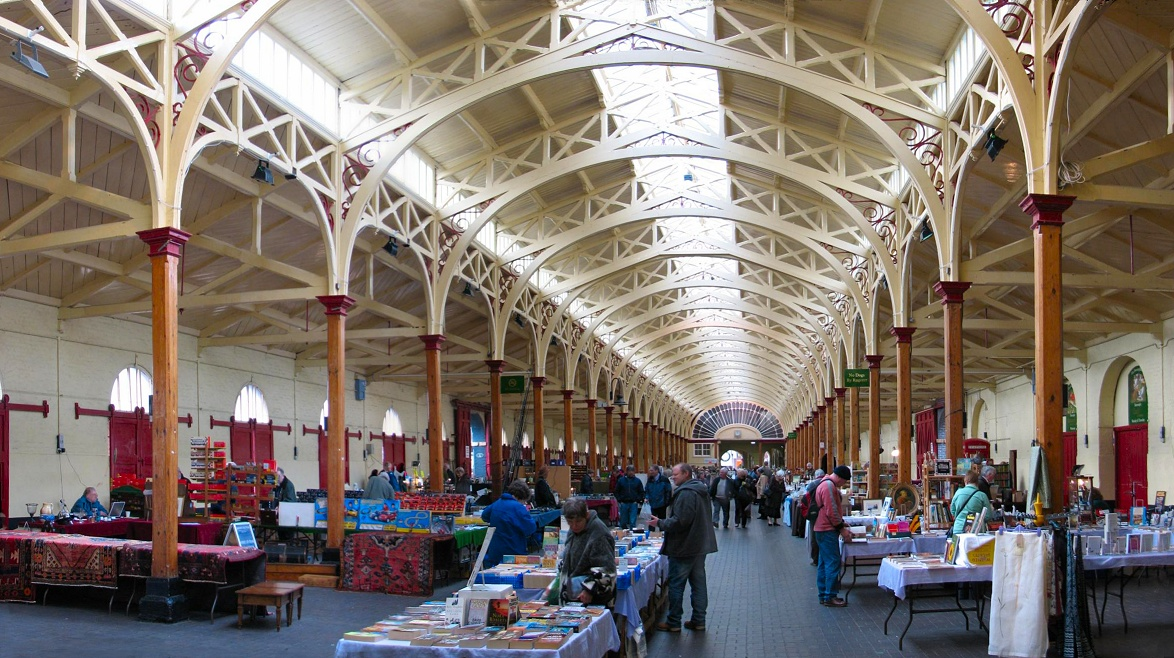
The interior of the Pannier Market

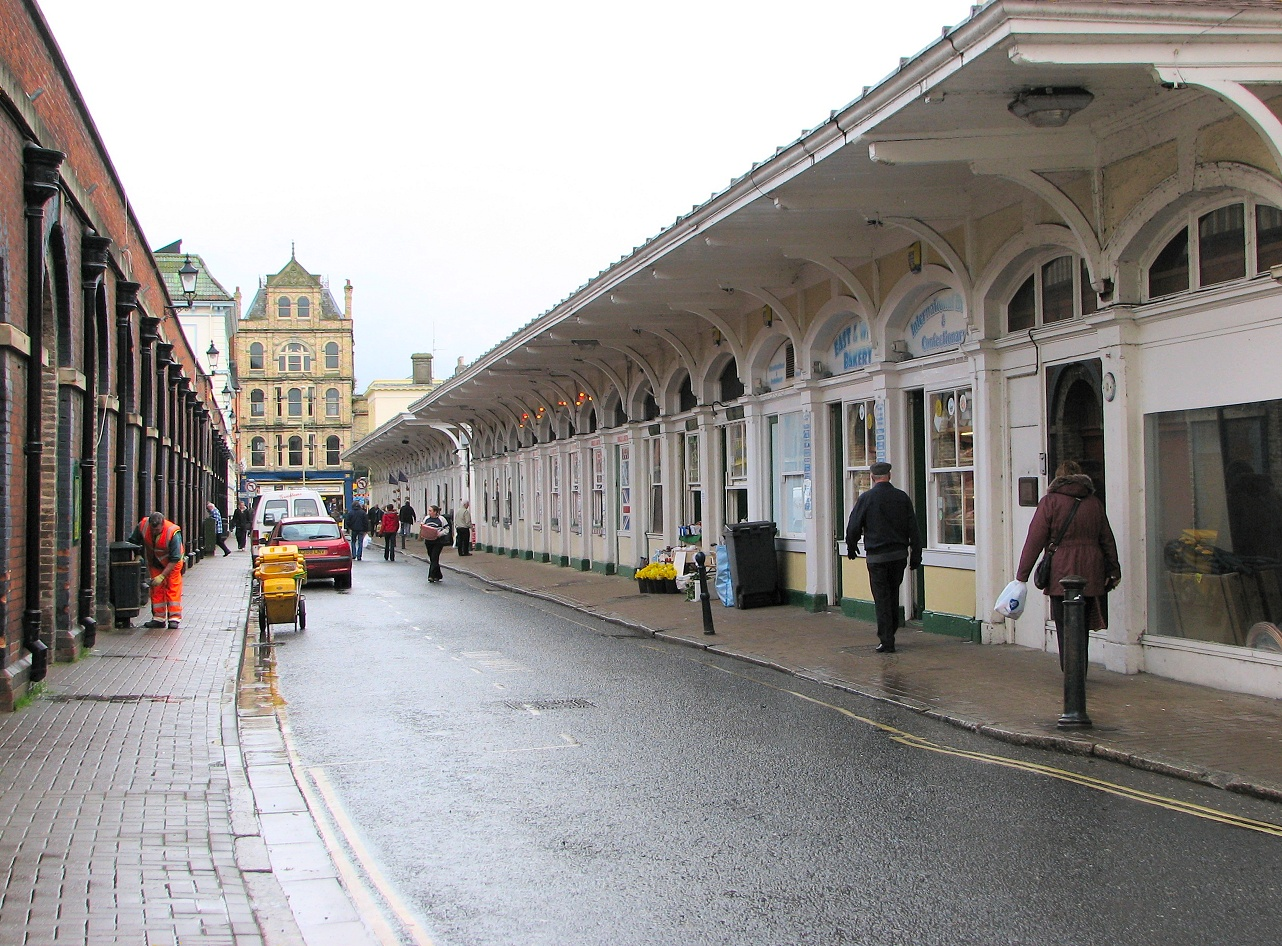
Butchers' Row, looking eastwards, with the side of the Pannier Market, left

Barnstaple has been the major market for North Devon since Saxon times. Demands for health regulation of its Victorian food market saw the construction in 1855–1856 of a Pannier Market, originally known as the Vegetable Market and designed by local architect R. D. Gould. This has a high glass-and-timber roof on iron columns. At 107 yards (98 m) long, it runs the length of Butchers' Row. Market days are Monday – Crafts and General (April to December), Tuesday – General and Produce, Wednesday – Arts Collectables and Books, Thursday – Crafts and General, Friday – General and Produce, and Saturday – General and Produce.

Built on the far side of the street at the same time as the Pannier Market, Butchers' Row has ten shops with pilasters of Bath Stone and wrought-iron supports for an overhanging roof. Only one is still a butcher's, although successor shops still sell local farm goods. There is a baker, a delicatessen, two fishmongers, a florist and a greengrocer.

In early 2020, the local Council web site provided a summary of the Pannier Market: "Largely unchanged in over 150 years, Barnstaple's historic Pannier Market has a wide range of stalls, with everything from fresh local produce, flowers and crafts, to prints and pictures, fashion and... two cafés."

The Pannier Market, Butchers Row, has been a Grade II listed building since 1951.

=== Others ===
Key
	Abbey/Priory/Cathedral
Accessible open space	Accessible open space
	Amusement/Theme Park
	Castle
Country Park	Country Park
	English Heritage
	Forestry Commission
Heritage railway	Heritage railway
Historic house	Historic House
Places of Worship	Places of Worship
Museum (free) Museum	Museum (free/not free)
National Trust	National Trust
	Theatre
	Zoo

In Barnstaple

- Albert Clock in The Square
- Barnstaple Cemetery, the town's burial ground
- Museum of Barnstaple and North Devon
- Queen's Theatre
- Businesses and Markets
- Barnstaple Town F.C.
- North Devon Crematorium, the largest crematorium in England, Wales and Northern Ireland
- Penrose's Almshouses
- Rock Park

Around Barnstaple

- Tarka Trail – The cycling and walking trails were established by Devon County Council, to celebrate Henry Williamson's 1927 novel Tarka the Otter. The book depicts Tarka's adventure travelling through North Devon's countryside.
- Arlington Court, 8 miles (13 km)
- Lundy Island, ferry sails from Bideford, 10 miles (16 km)
- Watersmeet House 20 miles (32 km)
- The South West Coast Path National Trail runs through the town, and gives access to walks along the spectacular North Devon coast.
- Lynton & Barnstaple Railway, 15 miles (24 km)

== Transport ==
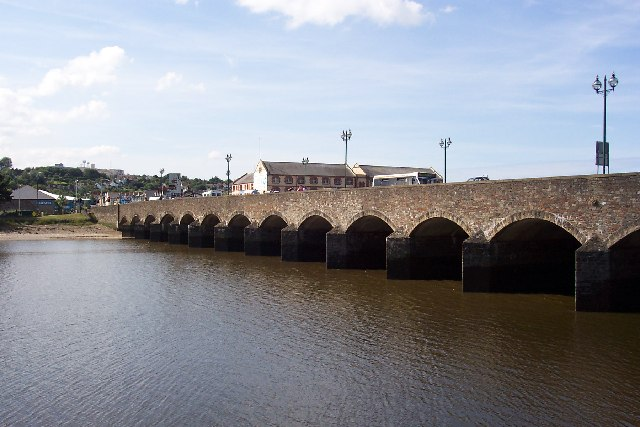
Barnstaple Long Bridge

In 1989, the A361 North Devon Link Road was built between Barnstaple and the M5 motorway, some 40 miles (65 km) to the east. Traffic congestion in the town was severe, but in May 2007, the Barnstaple Western Bypass was opened to take traffic towards Braunton and Ilfracombe away from the town centre and ancient bridge. It consists of 1.6 miles (2.6 km) of new road and a 447 yards (409 m) long, five-span bridge, and was expected to have cost £42 million. The town's main square was remodelled as the entrance to the town centre, and The Strand was closed to traffic. The A39, the Atlantic Highway, follows after the A361 to Bideford and to Bude and then further towards Cornwall.

Most of Barnstaple's bus network is run by Stagecoach South West & Filers. The main bus station is at the junction of Queen Street and Belle Meadow Drive. National Express has coach services to London, Heathrow Airport, Taunton, Bristol and Birmingham.

The nearest airport is Exeter Airport.

=== Railway ===
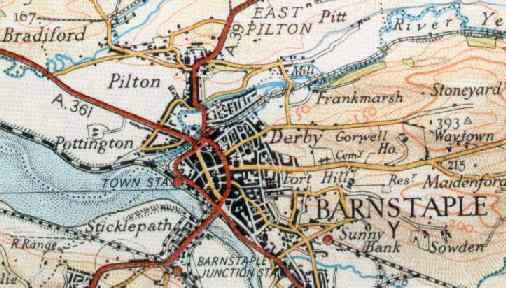
A map of Barnstaple from 1937, showing the railway lines.

Barnstaple railway station is the terminus of a branch line from Exeter known as the Tarka Line after a local connection with Tarka the Otter. The station is near the end of the Long Bridge, on the opposite bank of the Taw to the town centre. Several other stations closed with the publication of the Reshaping of British Railways (the Beeching Axe) report in the 1960s. The surviving one had been opened on 1 August 1854 by the North Devon Railway (later the London and South Western Railway), although a service had operated from Fremington since 1848 for goods traffic only. The station became "Barnstaple Junction" on 20 July 1874, when the railway opened the branch line to Ilfracombe, reverting to plain "Barnstaple" when this was closed on 5 October 1970. It is now a terminus and much reduced in size, as part of the site has been used for the Barnstaple Western Bypass.

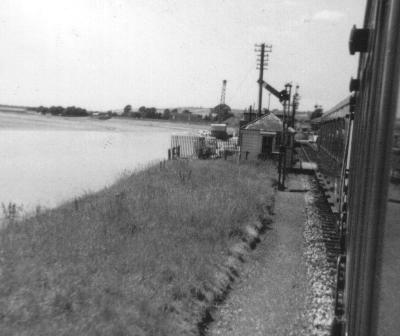
Ilfracombe Branchline in the late 1960s.

The Ilfracombe branch line brought the railway across the river into the town centre. Barnstaple Quay was situated close by the Castle Mound. It closed in 1898 in favour of a nearby Barnstaple Town station at North Walk, which was also the terminus of the narrow-gauge Lynton and Barnstaple Railway, until that closed in 1935. The narrow-gauge line's main operating centre was at nearby Pilton.

A separate Barnstaple station, renamed Barnstaple (Victoria Road) in 1949, was opened to the east of the town in 1873 as the terminus of the Devon and Somerset Railway and later part of the Great Western Railway. A junction was provided to allow trains access to Barnstaple Junction and these ran through to Ilfracombe. It was closed in 1970.

== Education ==
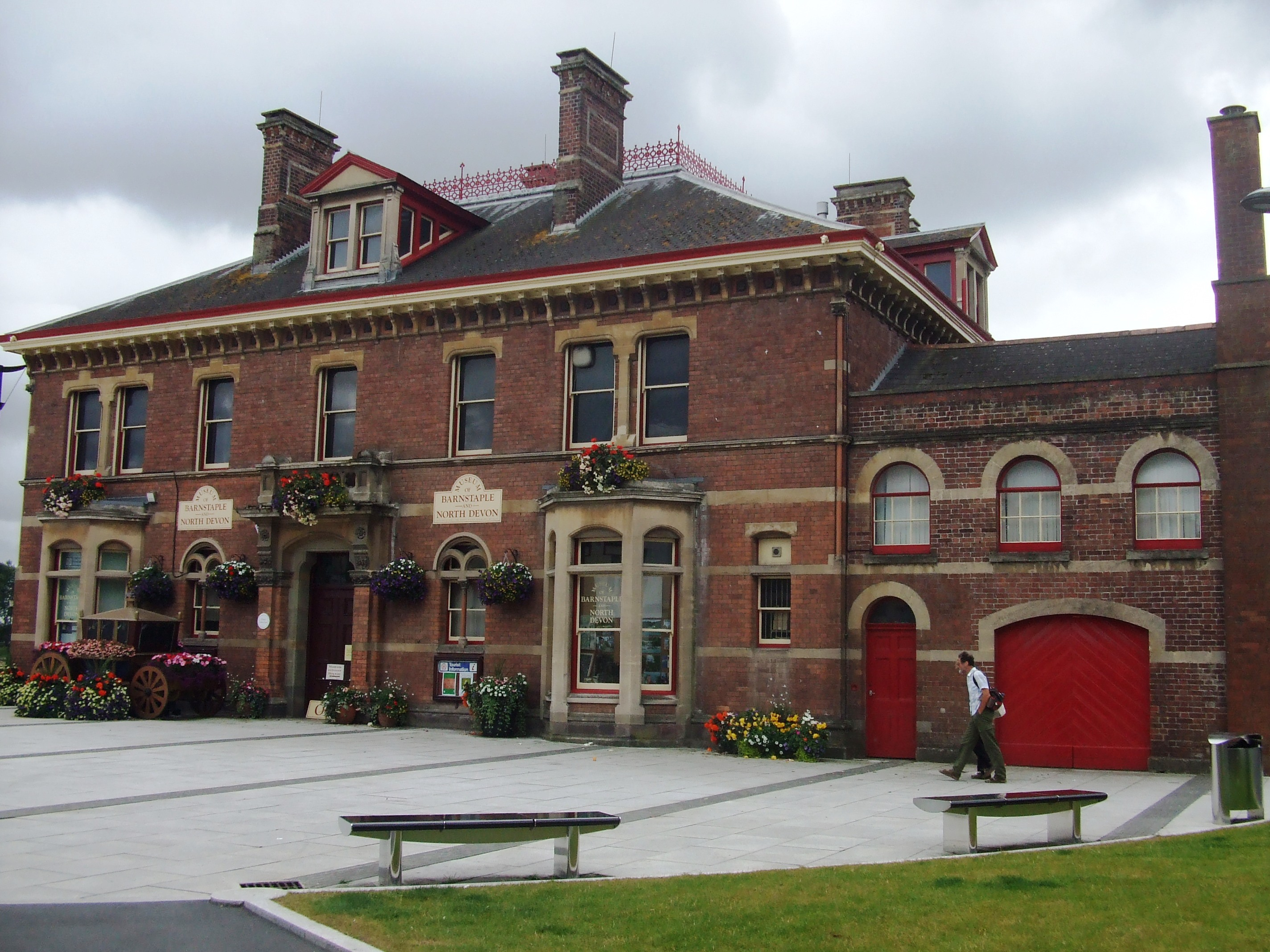
Museum of Barnstaple and North Devon

There are selected primary and secondary state schools and a tertiary college in Barnstaple.

In 2012, 58 per cent of Devon students achieved 5 GCSEs grade A* to C. The UK average is 59 per cent.

Percentage of students achieving 5 GCSEs grade A*to C
School name	Type	2008	2009	2010	2011	2012
The Park Community School	State	38%	44%	45%	47%	54%
Pilton Community College	State	47%	51%	50%	53%	49%

Petroc (formerly North Devon College) is a tertiary college offering a wide range of vocational and academic further education to more than 3,000 young people over 16. It was due to spend £100 million on a new campus to be opened on Seven Brethren in 2011, but this fell through when the Learning and Skills Council withdrew £75 million in funding in January 2009. Petroc was launched in September 2009, a year after NDC merged with Tiverton's East Devon College.

== Religious sites ==
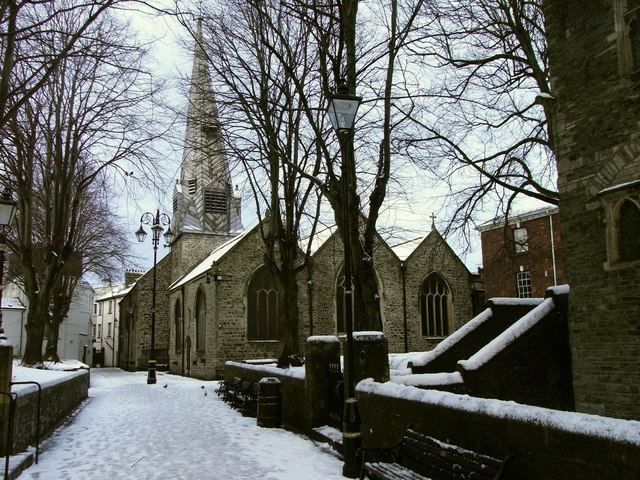
St Peter's church with its broach spire

St Peter's Church is the parish church of Barnstaple. Its oldest parts probably date to the 13th century, though the nave, chancel and tower date from 1318, when three altars were dedicated by Bishop Stapledon. The north and south aisles were added in about 1670. The church has a notable broach spire, claimed by W. G. Hoskins to be the best of its kind in the country. Inside the church are many mural monuments to 17th-century merchants, such as Raleigh Clapham (died 1636), George Peard (died 1644) and Thomas Horwood (died 1658), reflecting the prosperity of the town at that time. The interior of the church was heavily restored by George Gilbert Scott from 1866, and then by his son John Oldrid Scott into the 1880s, leaving it "dark and dull", according to Hoskins.

Other religious buildings include St Anne's Chapel (a 14th-century chantry chapel, now a museum) in the parish churchyard. The Church of St Mary the Virgin in the suburb of Pilton is 13th-century and a Grade I listed building; Holy Trinity, built in the 1840s but necessarily rebuilt in 1867 as its foundations were unsound. It has a fine tower in the Somerset style. The Roman Catholic Church of the Immaculate Conception is said to have been built to designs supplied by Pugin, in Romanesque Revival style. The late 19th-century church of St John the Baptist stands in the Newport area of the town. There is a Baptist chapel of 1870, which includes a lecture hall and classrooms.

== Media ==
Local news and television programmes are provided by BBC South West and ITV West Country. Television signals are received from the Huntshaw Cross and the local relay transmitters.

Barnstaple's local radio stations are BBC Radio Devon, Radio Exe Devon, Heart West, and community based stations: The Voice and Fresh FM, which is a student-run radio station that broadcast from the Petroc college in the town.

The North Devon Gazette and North Devon Journal are the town's local newspapers.

== Sport ==
Cricket is played at Barnstaple and Pilton. The association football club Barnstaple Town F.C. has been based at Mill Road since 1904 and plays in the Southern Football League Division One South. Barnstaple Rugby Football Club first team plays in National League 2 West, the fourth tier of the English rugby union system.

Several sports are available at Tarka Leisuire Centre which has six indoor courts and hosted the Aegon GB Pro-Series Barnstaple. It is also the home of Barnstaple Squash Club. In February 2010 a Cornish Pilot Gig Rowing Club was established, bringing the sport to Castle Quay in the centre of Barnstaple.

== Notable people ==
The following people have a connection with the town, in birth date order:

- Henry de Bracton (c.1210–c.1258), cleric and jurist, Archdeacon of Barnstaple from 1264.
- Robert Carey (1515–1586), landowner, became local MP in 1553, Sheriff of Devon in 1555–1556 and Recorder of Barnstaple from 1560.
- Philip Baker, (fl. 1558–1601), provost of King's College, Cambridge.
- Robert Turner (died 1599), a Scottish Catholic divine.
- Richard Ferris (died 1649), merchant and local MP from 1640, founded Barnstaple Grammar School.
- Pentecost Dodderidge (died c. 1650), was elected local MP in 1621, 1624 and 1625.
- Richard Callicott (1604–1686), leader of Massachusetts Bay Colony.
- Jonathan Hanmer (1606–1687), an ejected minister.
- John Dodderidge (1610–1659), elected local MP, 1646 and 1652.
- John Loosemore (1618–1681), a noted builder of pipe organs, including the one in Exeter Cathedral.
- John Gay (1685–1732), poet and dramatist
- Thomas Branker (1633–1676), an English mathematician.
- John Corey (fl.1701–1735), stage actor and playwright.
- James Parsons (1705–1770), physician, antiquary and prolific medical author born in Barnstaple
- Sir James Knight-Bruce (1791–1866), barrister, judge and politician.
- Frederick Richard Lee (1798–1879), an English artist.
- Graham Gore (c. 1809 – c. 1847), naval officer and polar explorer lost during the Franklin Expedition
- Henry Fry (1826–1892), a politician and merchant in British Columbia.
- John Headon Stanbury (1835–1907), hotelier, property developer and businessman in Exeter
- William Hoyle (1842–1918), politician and furniture maker in Ontario.
- Francis Carruthers Gould (1844–1925), caricaturist and cartoonist.
- Caleb Simper (1856–1942), organist and composer of popular sacred choral works, lived in locally 1890s-1942.
- Fred M. White (1859–1935), author of science-fiction and disaster novels, spent his old age locally, set three novels there.
- Hubert Bath (1883–1945), composed musical scores for many films in the 1920s and 1930s.
- Francis Chichester (1901–1972), pioneering aviator and solo sailor
- George Hart (1902–1987), first-class cricketer with Middlesex, died in Barnstaple
- Elizabeth Lemarchand (1906-2000), writer, born in Barnstaple
- Charles Poynder (1910–1994), cricketer, born in Barnstaple
- Stafford Somerfield (1911–1995), editor of News of the World.
- Brian Thomas (1912–1989), artist of church paintings
- Racey Helps (1913–1970), children's writer and illustrator, lived in the town from 1962 until his death.
- Jeremy Thorpe (1929–2014), Liberal Party leader, MP for North Devon constituency centred on Barnstaple in 1959–1978.
- Nigel Brooks (born 1936), musical composer and conductor of the BBC Concert Orchestra.
- Johnny Kingdom (1939–2018), wildlife film-maker and photographer
- John Keay (born 1941), historian and radio presenter
- Richard Eyre (born 1943), a film, theatre, TV and opera director
- Snowy White (born 1948), English guitarist, played with rock group Thin Lizzy
- Tim Wonnacott (born 1951), antiques expert and TV presenter
- David Spiegelhalter (born 1953), statistician
- Dermot Murnaghan (born 1957), Sky News TV broadcaster.
- Anne-Marie Dawe (born 1968), the RAF's first fully qualified female navigator from 1991.
- Tim Montgomerie (born 1970), political activist, blogger and columnist
- Marc Edworthy (born 1972), professional footballer
- Katie Hopkins (born 1975), columnist and political commentator
- Phil Vickery (born 1976), rugby player and former England captain
- Lou Sanders (born 1978), stand-up comedian
- Stuart Brennan (born 1982), BAFTA winning actor
- George Friend (born 1987), professional footballer
- Andy King (born 1988), professional footballer
- Tommy Langford (born 1989), professional boxer
