= Brannam Pottery =

Pottery in Barnstaple, Devon

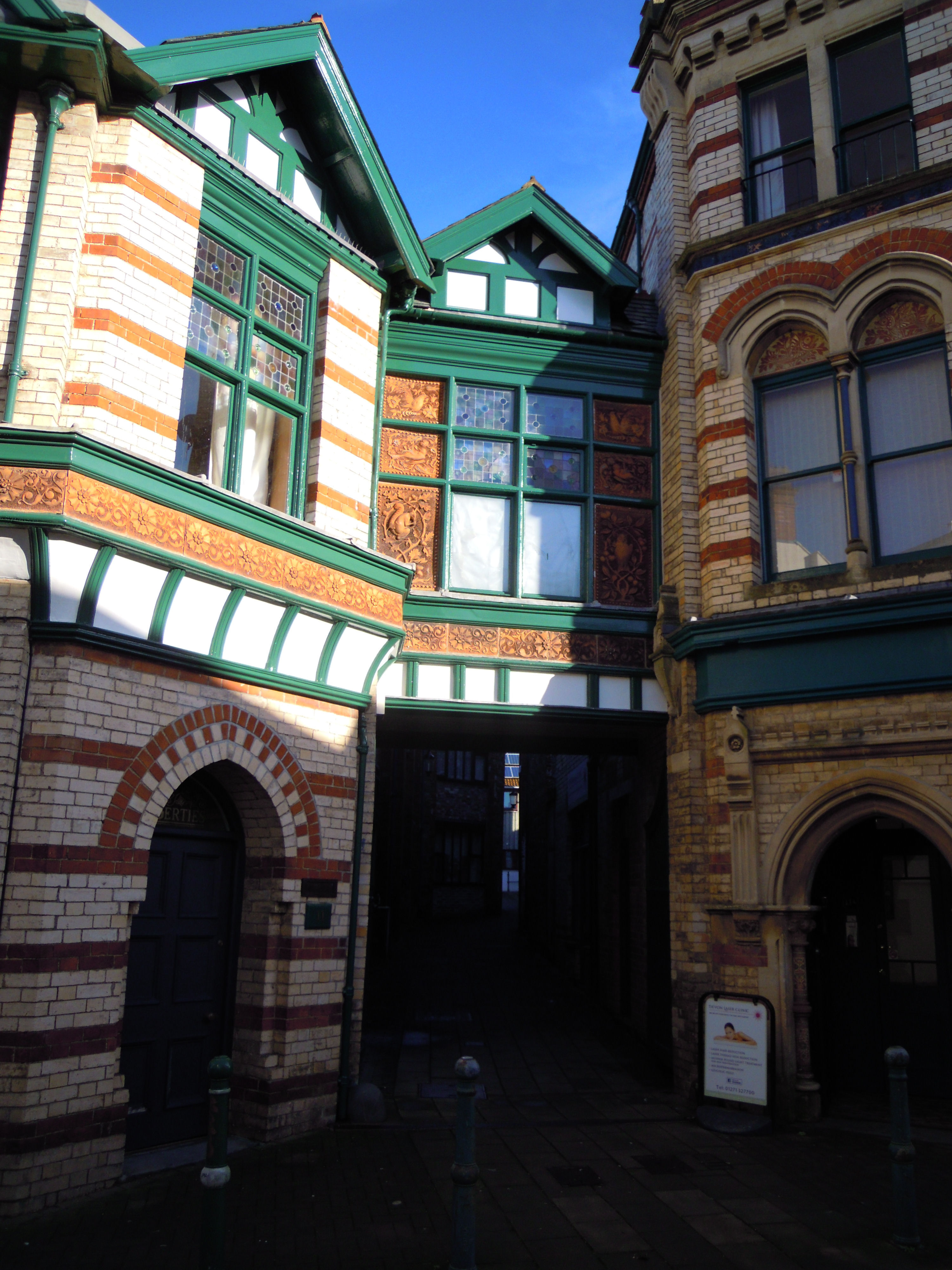
The Grade II listed entrance to the former Brannam Pottery in 2018

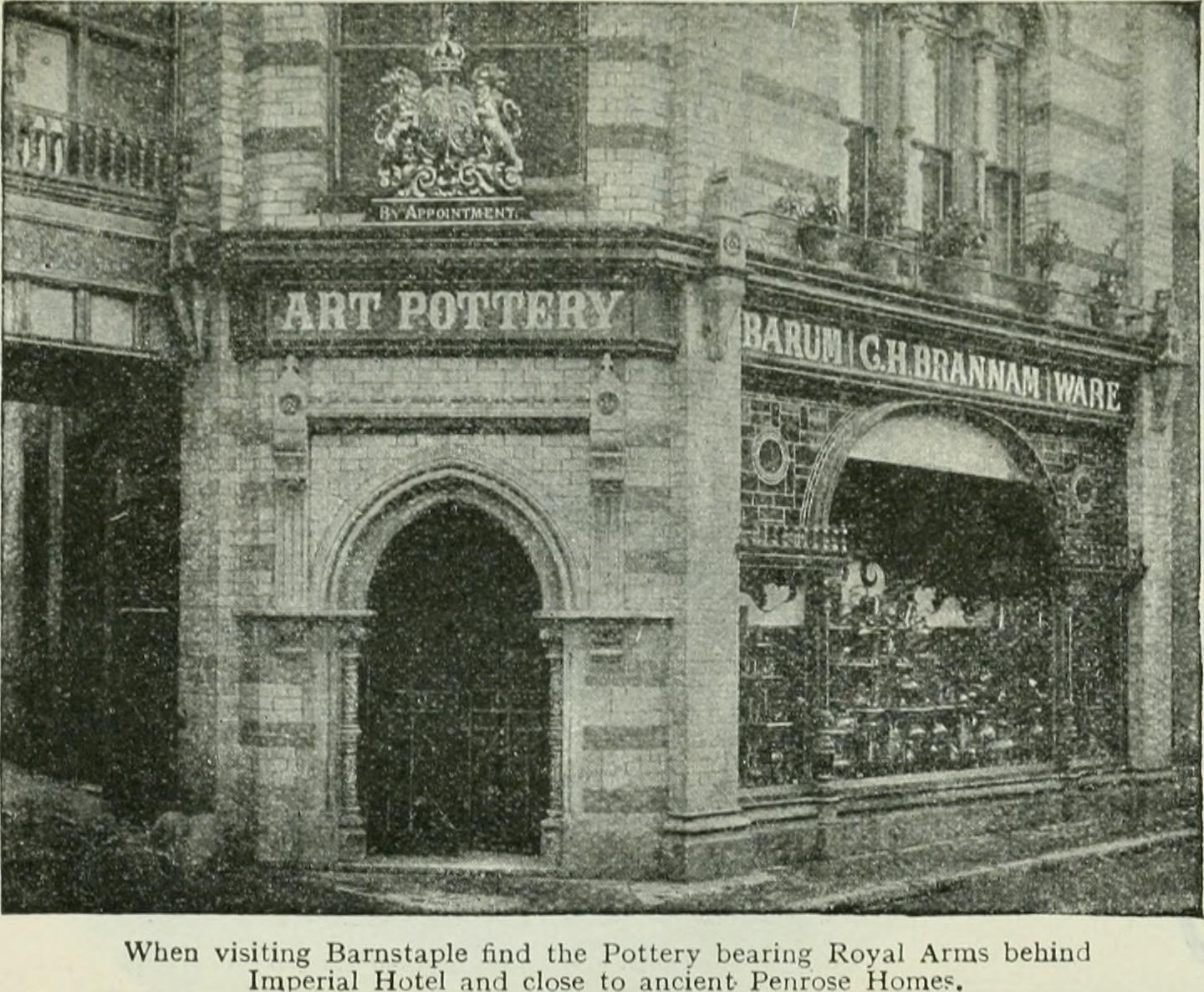
The Brannam Pottery shop, c. 1914

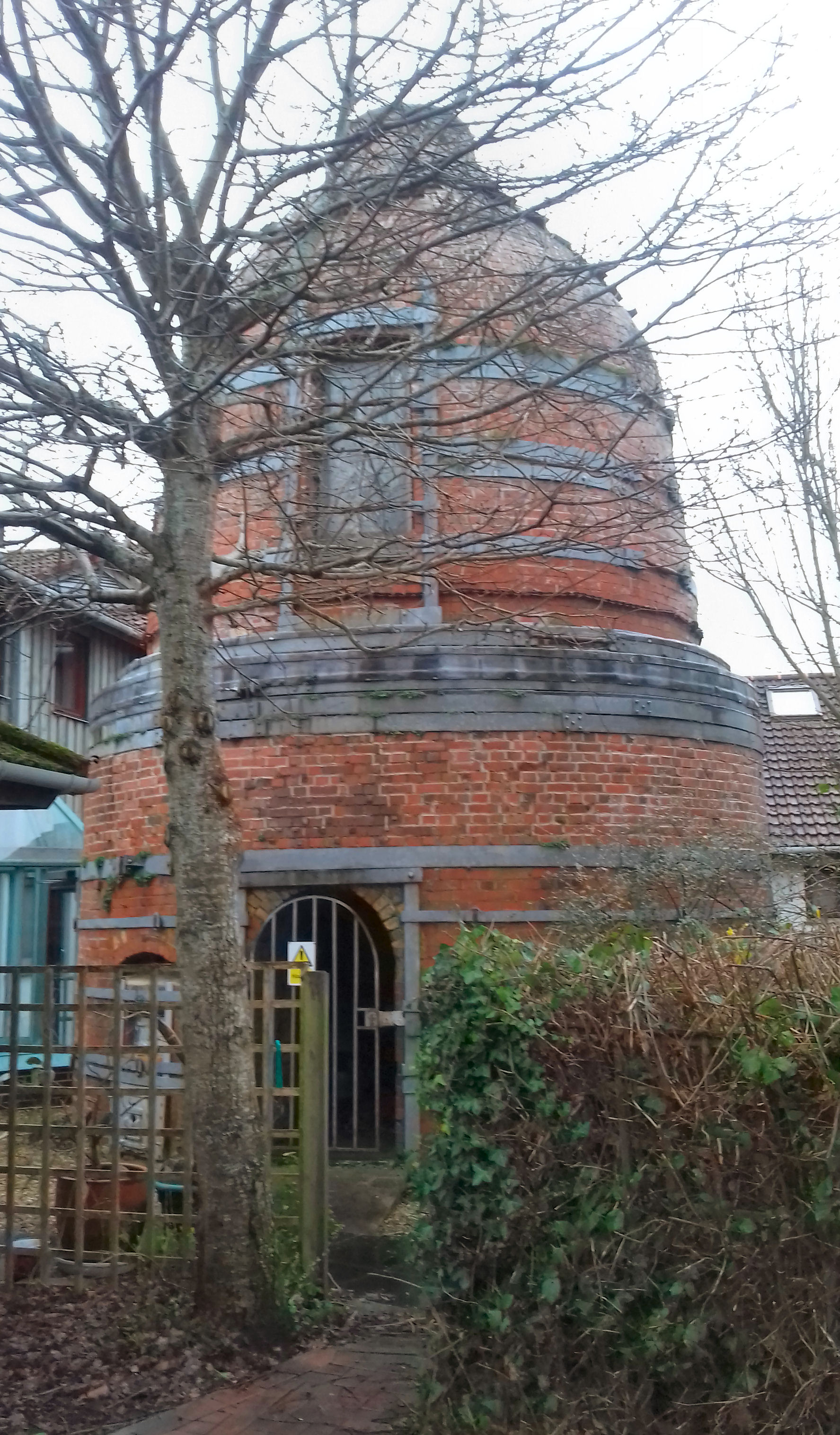
The last surviving kiln of Brannam Pottery

Brannam Pottery was a British pottery started by Thomas Backway Brannam in Barnstaple, Devon, England, in 1848. It later became part of the "rustic" wing of the art pottery movement.

== History ==
Thomas Brannam took over the lease of an existing pottery at North Walk, and another in Litchdon Street, Barnstaple. Like other pottery firms of the time, the firm originally made utilitarian wares such as basic household items, floor tiles, bricks and sewage pipes. This was their "bread and butter" trade, although one of their decorative jugs secured a medal at the Great Exhibition in 1851.

In 1867 Thomas's son, Charles Hubert Brannam, left school at age 12 to start work at the pottery. Charles won a prize for art at school and also won the Queen's Prize for Drawing in 1870. Initially educated in the theory and practice of ceramics, he was encouraged by a local dignitary, William Frederick Rock, who invited him to London where he studied pottery in the various museums. In 1879 he persuaded his father to allow him to produce art ware. His father agreed on the proviso that Charles paid for the materials he used.

Charles eventually took over the Litchdon Street pottery and further developed the art pottery department, utilising the "sgraffito" technique of scratching into a covering of "slip" to show the clay beneath. He recruited skilled designers, but also continued to throw the ware himself. In 1885 he received an order from Queen Victoria which resulted in excellent publicity for the business. In 1886 Charles registered the name Royal Barum Ware and ensured it was sold by several London firms including Liberty.

Charles handed the business over to his sons, Charles William Brannam, and John Woolacott (Jack) Brannam, in 1913. In 1914 C.H. Brannam and Sons became a limited liability company. Jack's son, Peter, carried out considerable modernization in the post-war period, but when he retired in 1979 he sold the business to Candy Tiles of Newton Abbot. They found the old Litchdon Street premises too cramped for their operation, and in 1989 moved the company to a site on the Roundswell Industrial Estate. Despite the fact that no member of the family was still connected with it, it was still called "C.H.Brannam & Sons Ltd". It ceased operations in 2005.

The original premises in Litchdon Street partly survive now with their terracotta detailing and stained glass with a preserved kiln still visible in the car park of a medical practice. These premises are now Grade II listed.

The company has used many marks over the years including C H Brannam, Barum, and Barnstaple.

== Museum ==
The company's collection of ceramic works was purchased by the Museum of Barnstaple and North Devon with the help of the Art Fund.

== Gallery ==
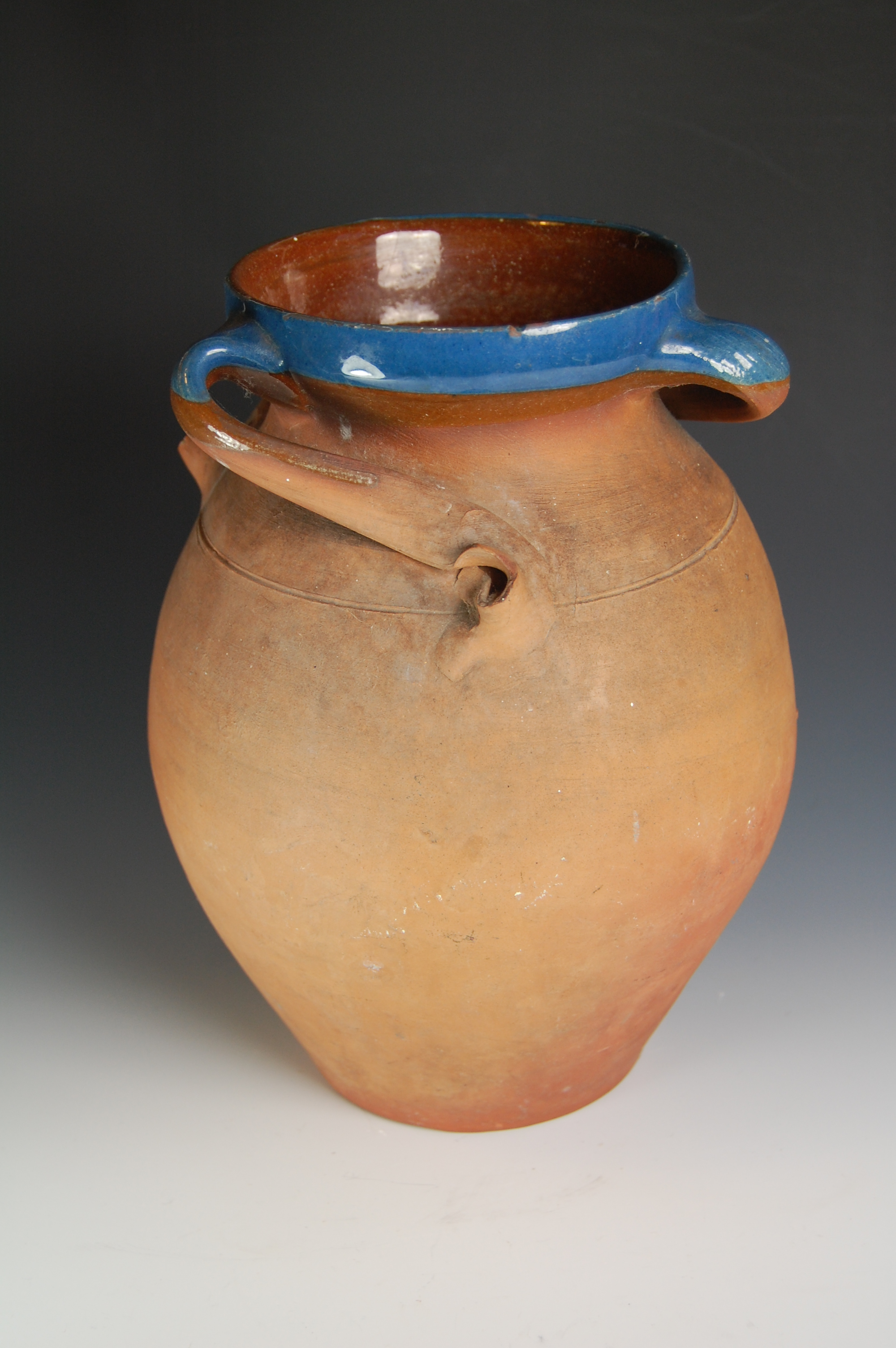
Brannam Pottery handled vase

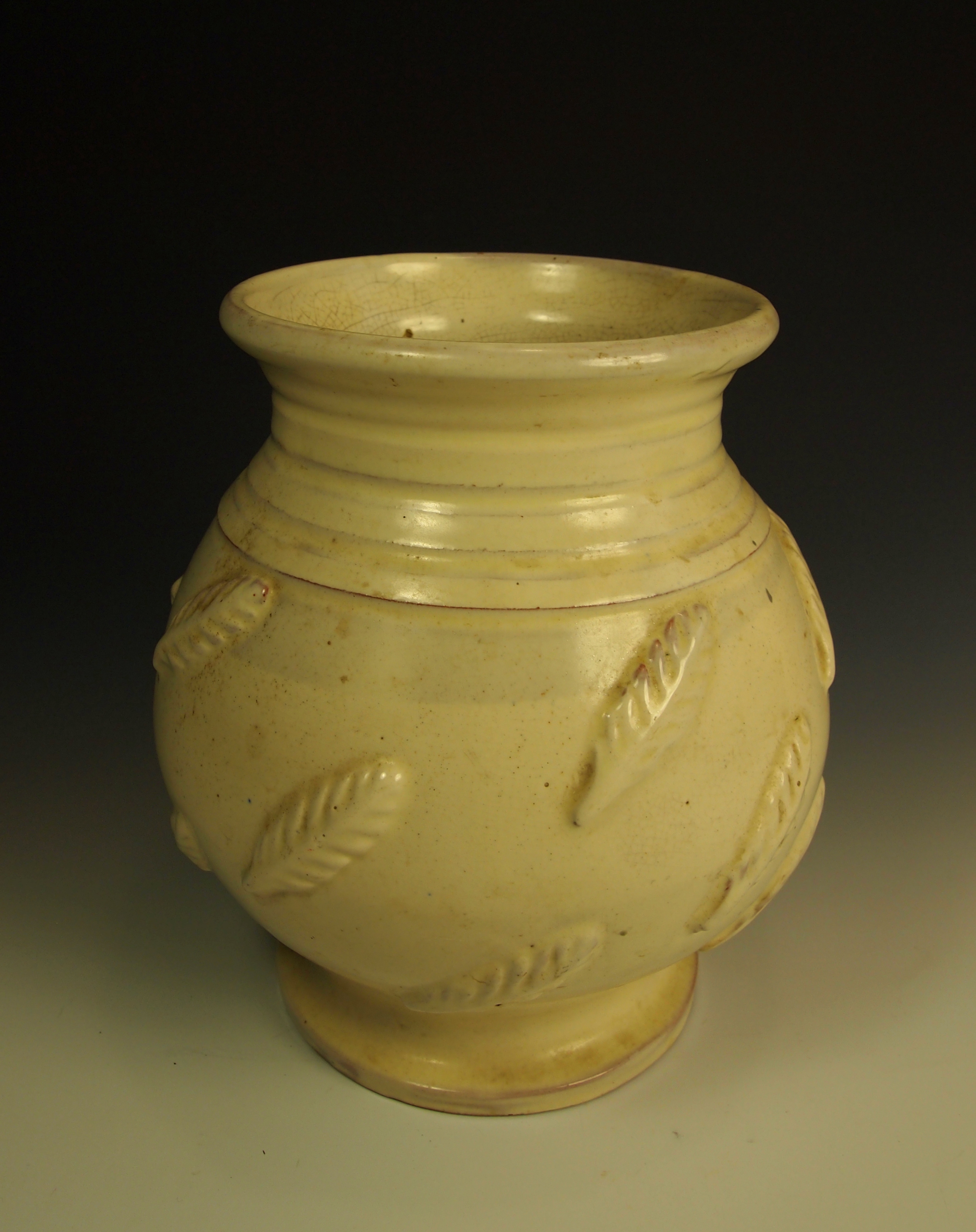
Brannam Pottery vase 1930s

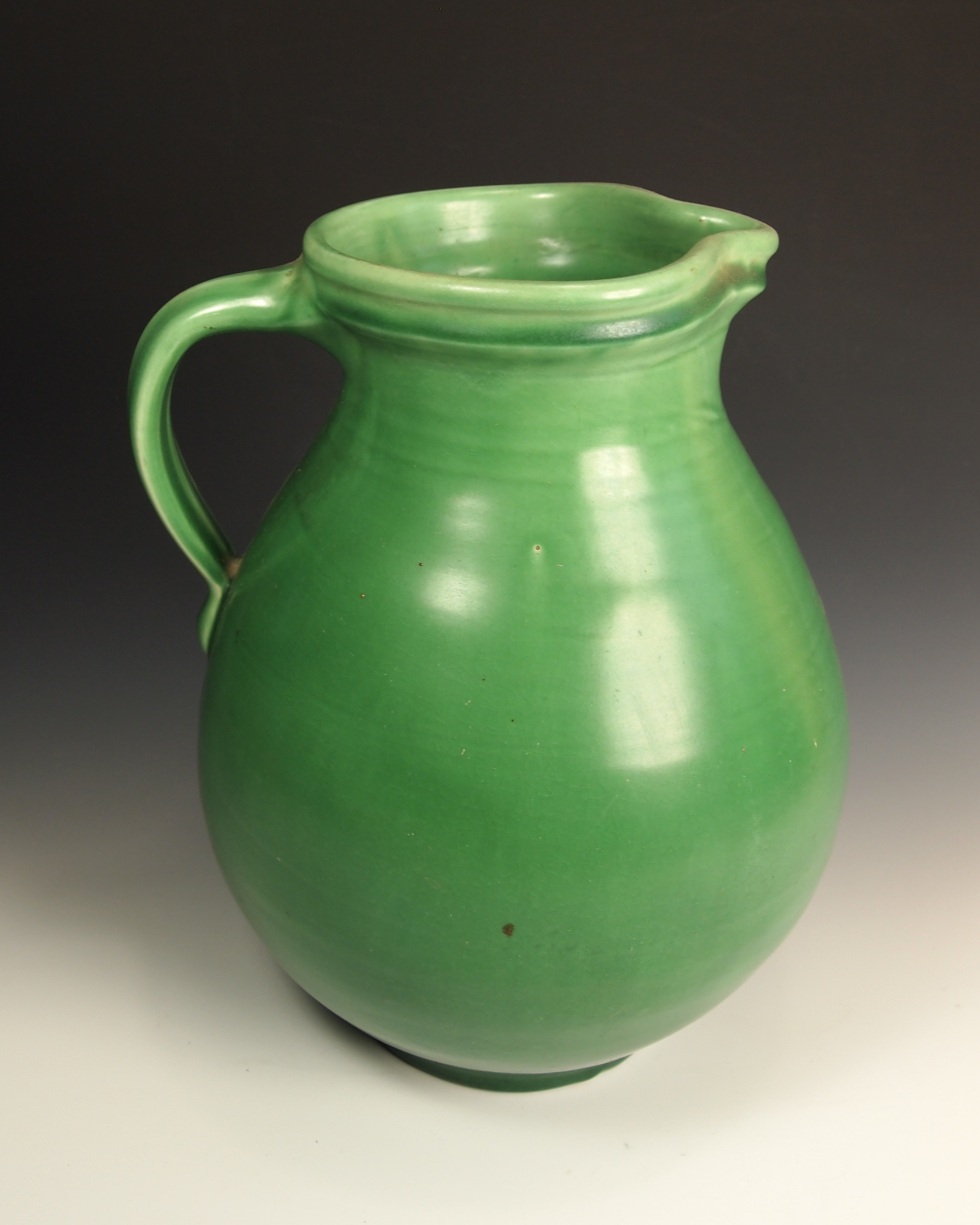
Brannam Pottery jug 1930s

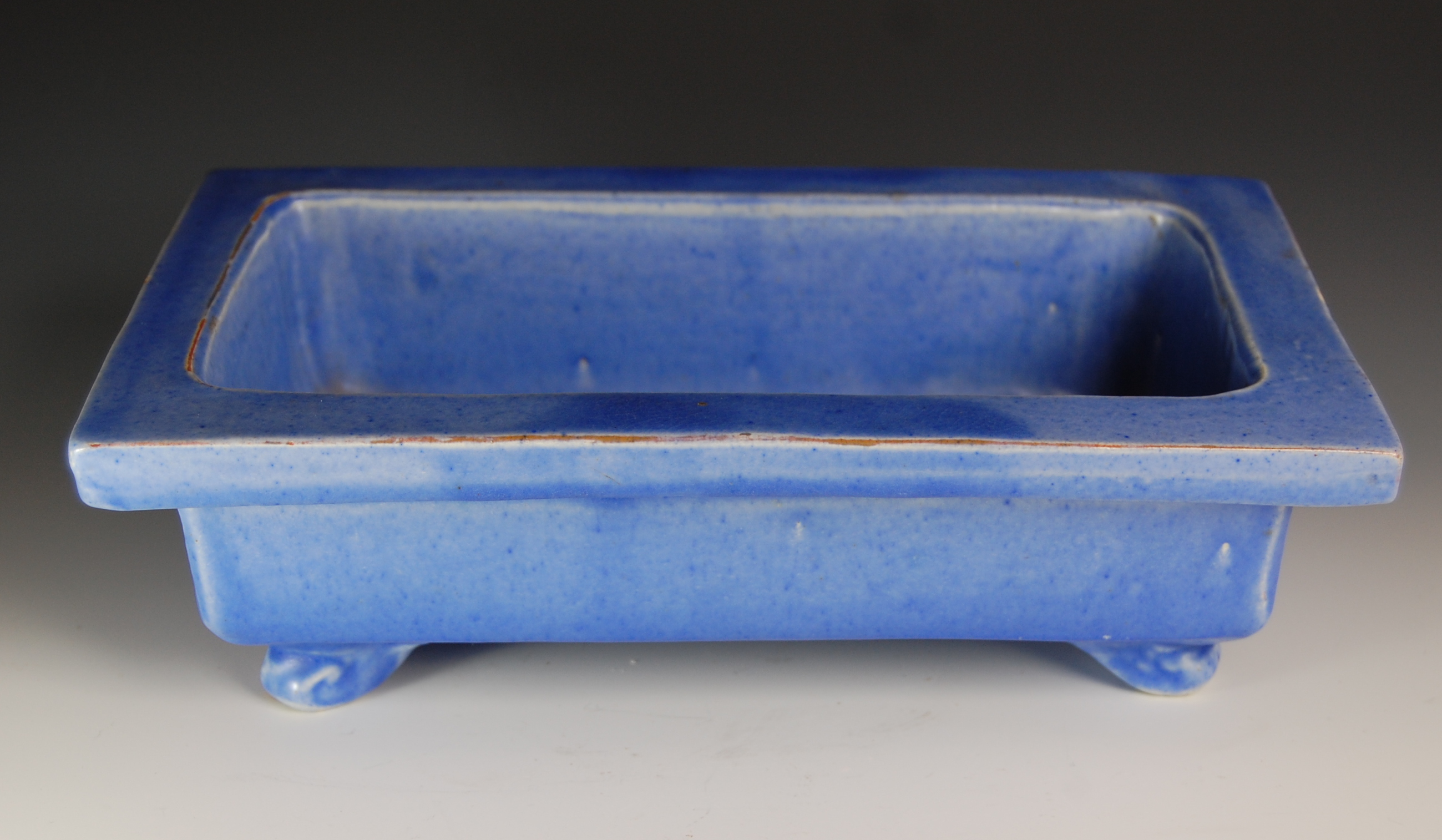
Brannam Pottery dish

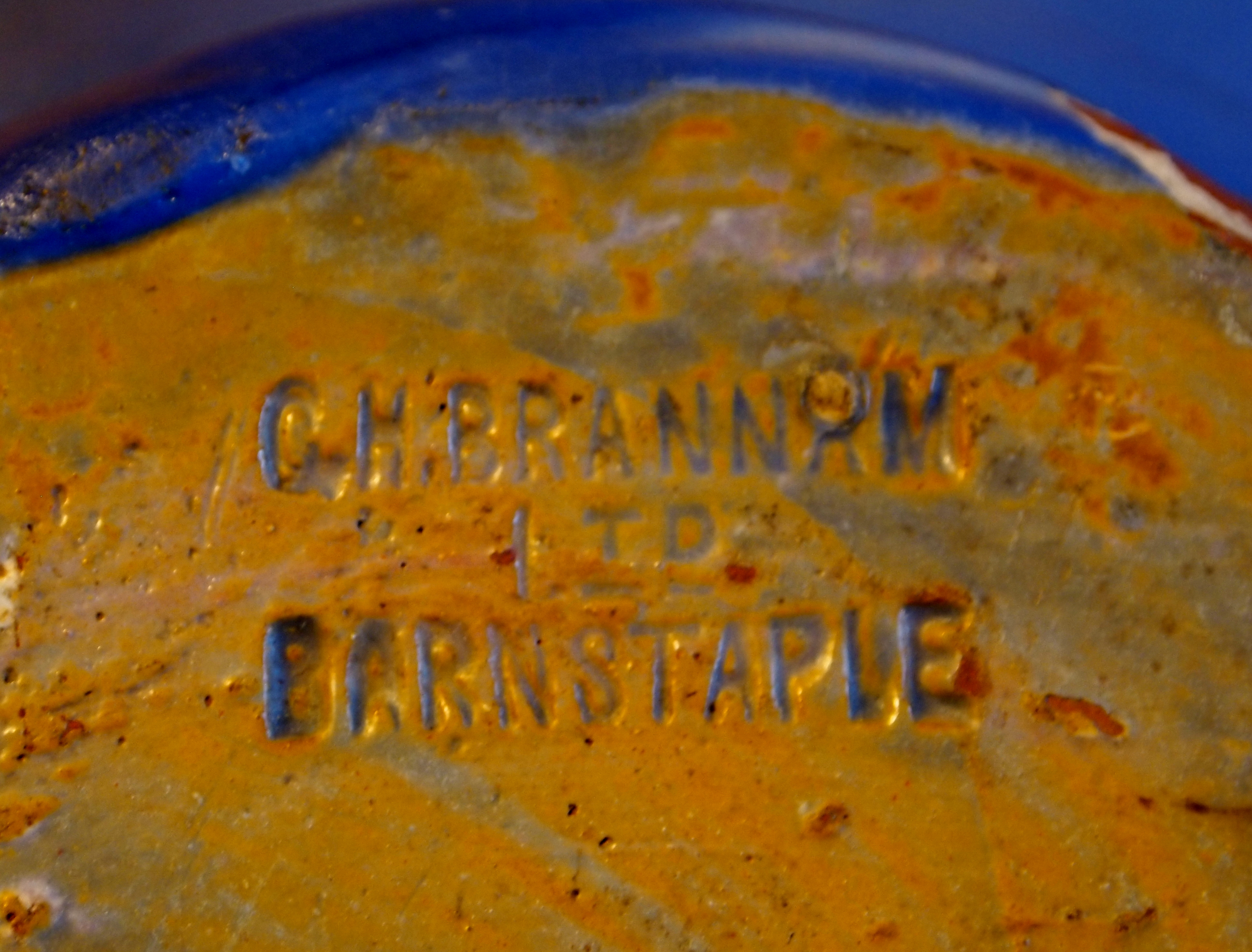
Brannam Pottery mark 1930s
