= Museum of Barnstaple and North Devon =

History museum in Devon, England

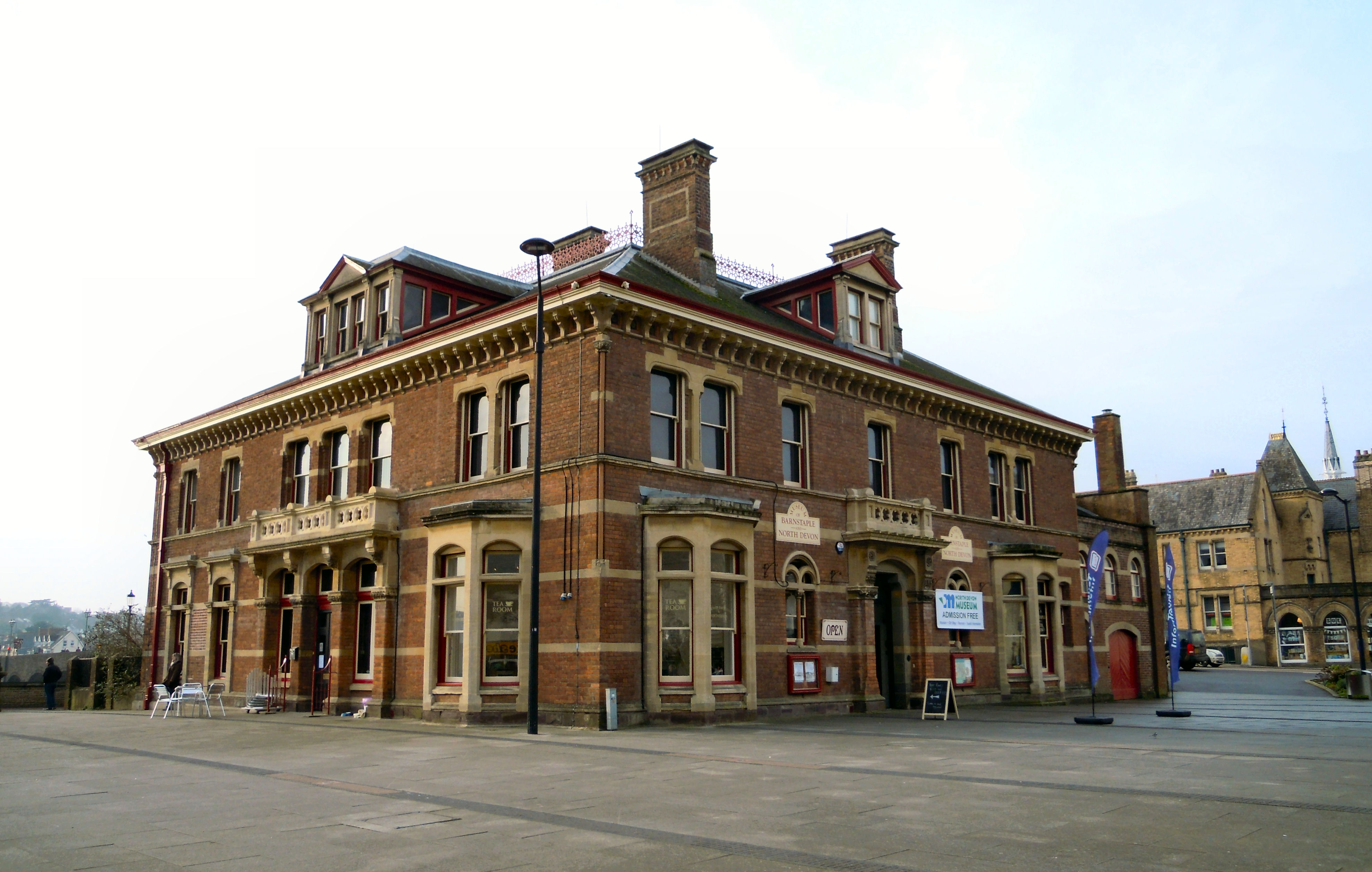
- Museum of Barnstaple and North Devon in 2018

- Shown in Devon
- Established: 1888
- Location: Barnstaple, Devon
- Coordinates: 51°04′40″N 4°03′32″W
- Website: www.barnstaplemuseum.org.uk

Museum of Barnstaple and North Devon is a local museum covering the history and culture of the North Devon area and which is located in The Square in Barnstaple in Devon. The displays range from prehistoric times to the Victorian era. The building and its garden railings beside the river front have been Grade II listed since 1988.

== Design ==
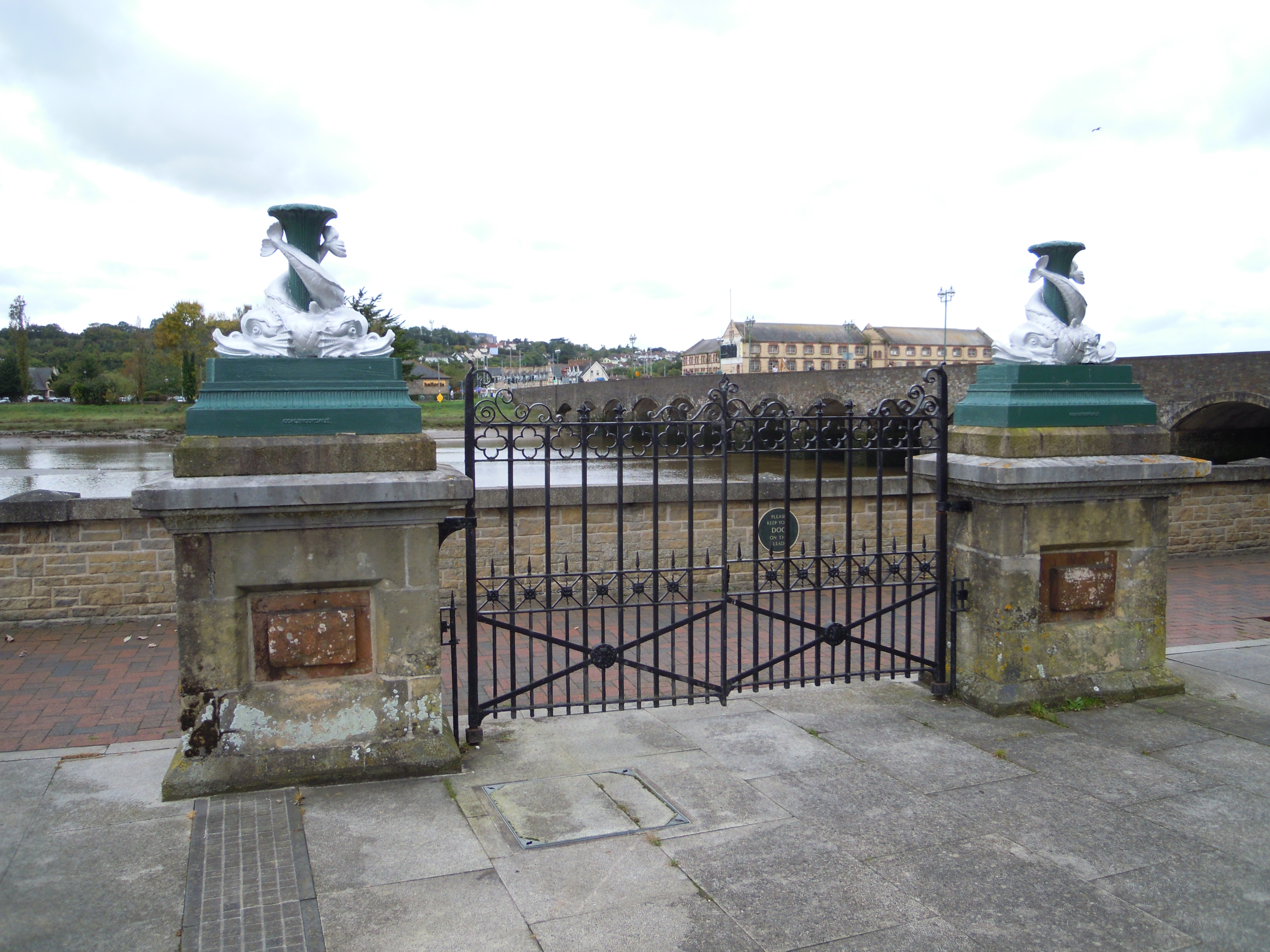
The gates and gate piers are Grade II listed

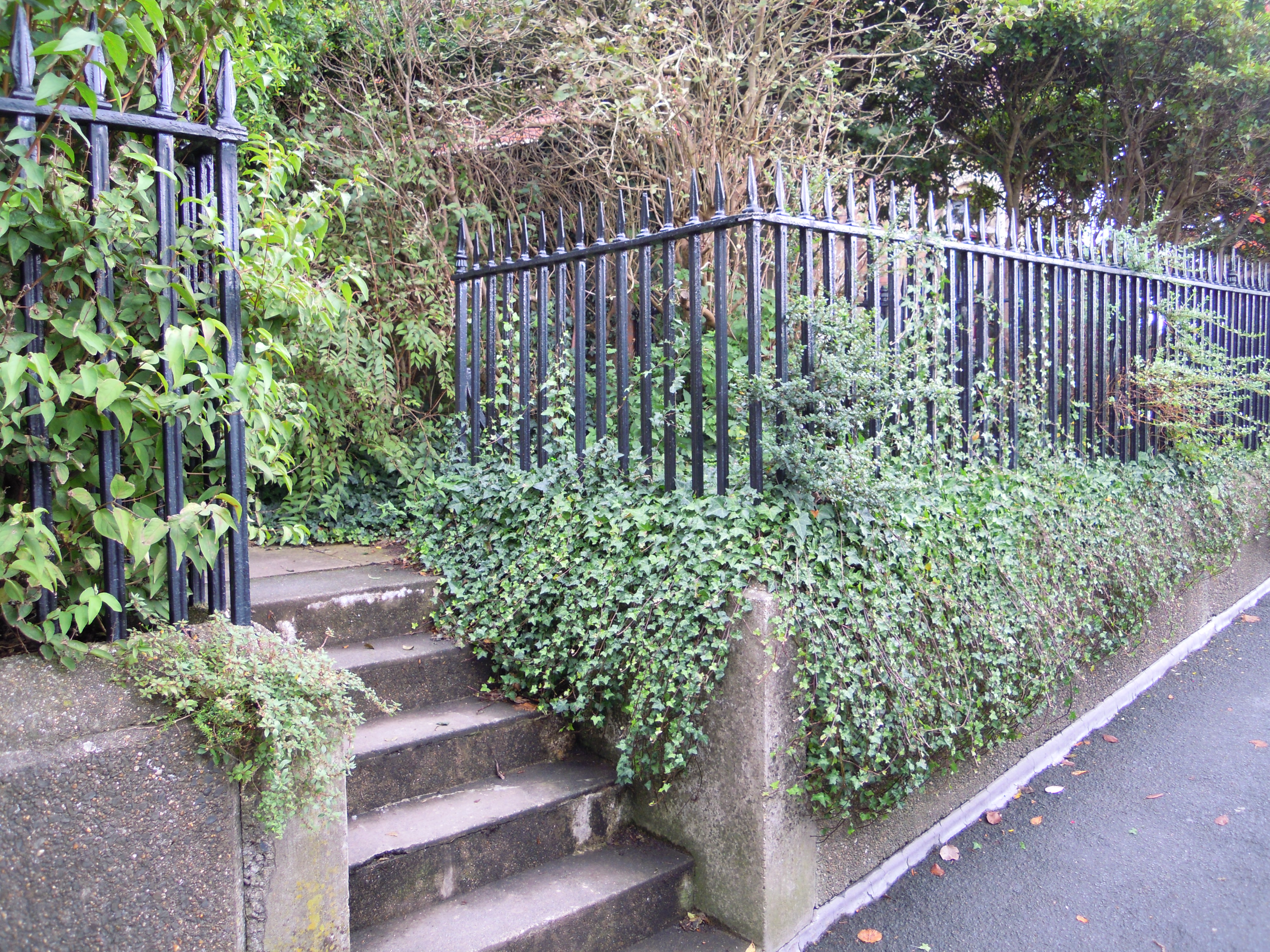
The garden railings form part of the building's listed status

The structure was built in 1872 for William Thorne, but sold to the Barnstaple Bridge Trust in 1876 who then sold it to William Frederick Rock. Constructed in red brick with dressings of stone and terracotta, the hipped and slated roof has a flat central section which is set with ornamental iron railings together with 5 red brick chimneys with stone caps. The building is square and is built round an internal courtyard with on the right on the building's North side a small service wing which may actually be a former coach-house with a walled courtyard behind.

Inside is a fine wooden staircase in the Jacobean style with twisted balusters and large carved newels with a Gothic stone fireplace in the entrance hall. Behind the building on the river front there is a small garden enclosed by iron railings having spearhead uprights and standards; these railings form part of the listed status for the property. The gate piers and gates with the bases of dolphin lamp posts adjacent to the building are separately listed.

== History ==
The museum was founded as the North Devon Athenæum in 1888 by William Frederick Rock, who intended it to serve as a replacement for the Barnstaple Literary and Scientific Institute he had created in 1845. In addition to functioning as a library and museum, the building served as an informal records office for Barnstaple. An innovation unusual at that time was that men and women shared the reading rooms as Rock believed that separate facilities would encourage women to gossip rather than read. The Librarian lived in the building, a requirement that lasted until the 1930s.

The Devon County Library Service occupied the main floor from 1956, relocating from much smaller premises in the Bridge Buildings across the road. In 1988 the library collection was moved to the specially built North Devon Library and Record Office. The museum collection remained, and was loaned to the Museum of Barnstaple and North Devon, which took over the space.

== The Collection ==
The museum's collections and displays cover the natural and human history of North Devon. Galleries include the Tarka Gallery, the Story of North Devon, the Regimental Collections of the Royal Devon Yeomanry and the Royal 1st Devon Yeomanry, furniture by Shapland & Petter and a collection of 17th century pewter and ceramics from the area including Art Pottery by Brannam Pottery, William Leonard Baron and Alexander Lauder. Also on display is a full-size recreation of the front half of the Barnstaple Elephant (Palaeoloxodon antiquus), a rare straight-tusked elephant which became extinct in the UK around 115,000 years ago and the fossil of which was excavated in Barnstaple in February 1844. On display in the prehistory gallery are some tusk and bone fragments while whole teeth were taken to the Natural History Museum in London.

The museum was among ten candidates shortlisted for the £100,000 Gulbenkian Prize for Museum of the Year in 2005 for its work investigating the history of Shapland & Petter, a Barnstaple manufacturing company. In November 2017 the museum was targeted by thieves who broke into the museum and smashed display cabinets, making off with two limited edition Royal Mint collections of gold coins, thought to be worth around £15,000.

The museum is home to a gift shop and Bromley's Tearoom, named after Bromley's cafe - a Barnstaple institution and social hub - once located on the High Street.

In May 2018 the museum closed so that an extension could be built. It reopened in October 2019.

In 2023 the Museum joined Arts Council England's funding programme as a National Portfolio Organisation.

== Gallery ==
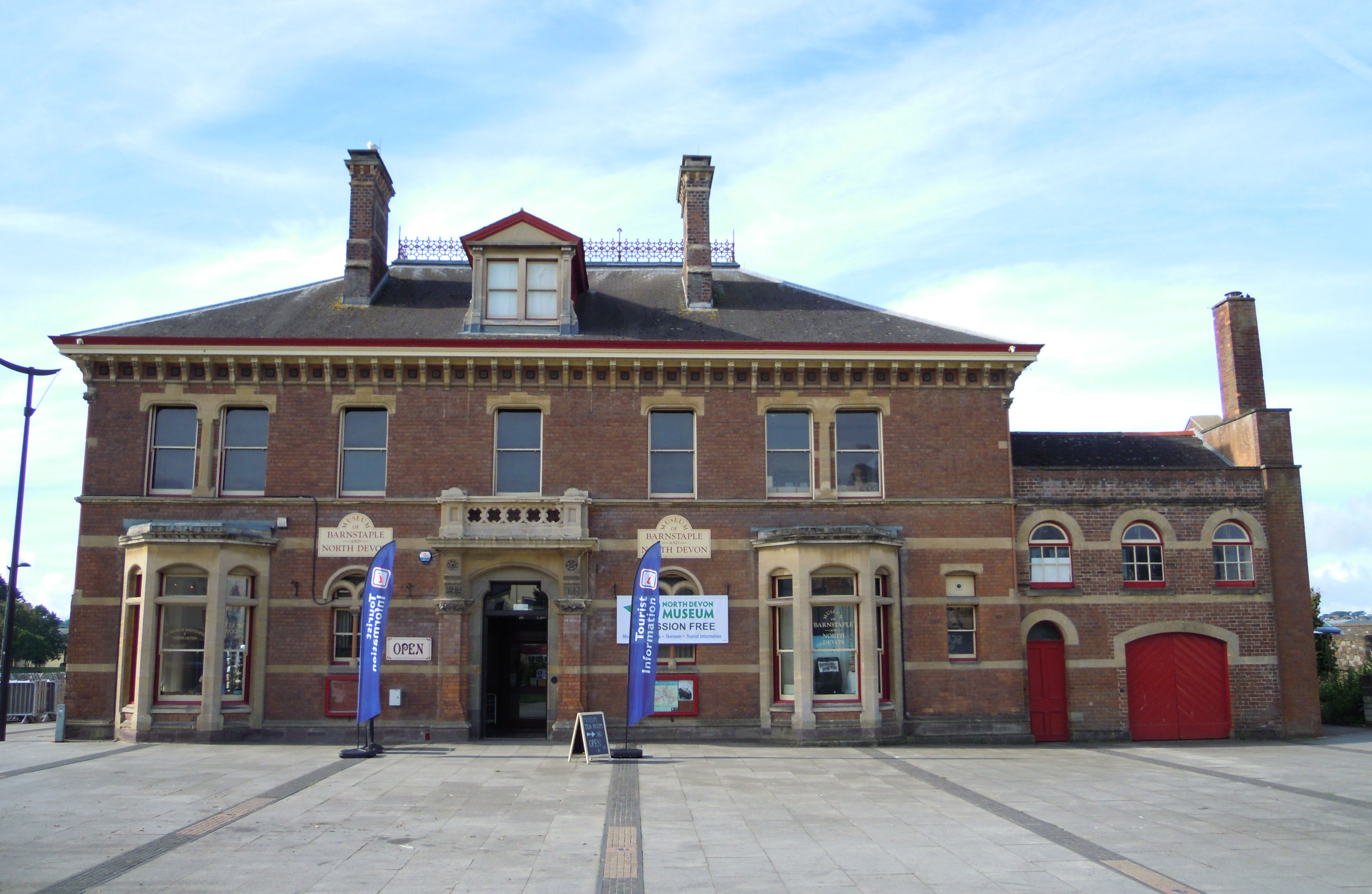
The Museum of Barnstaple and North Devon

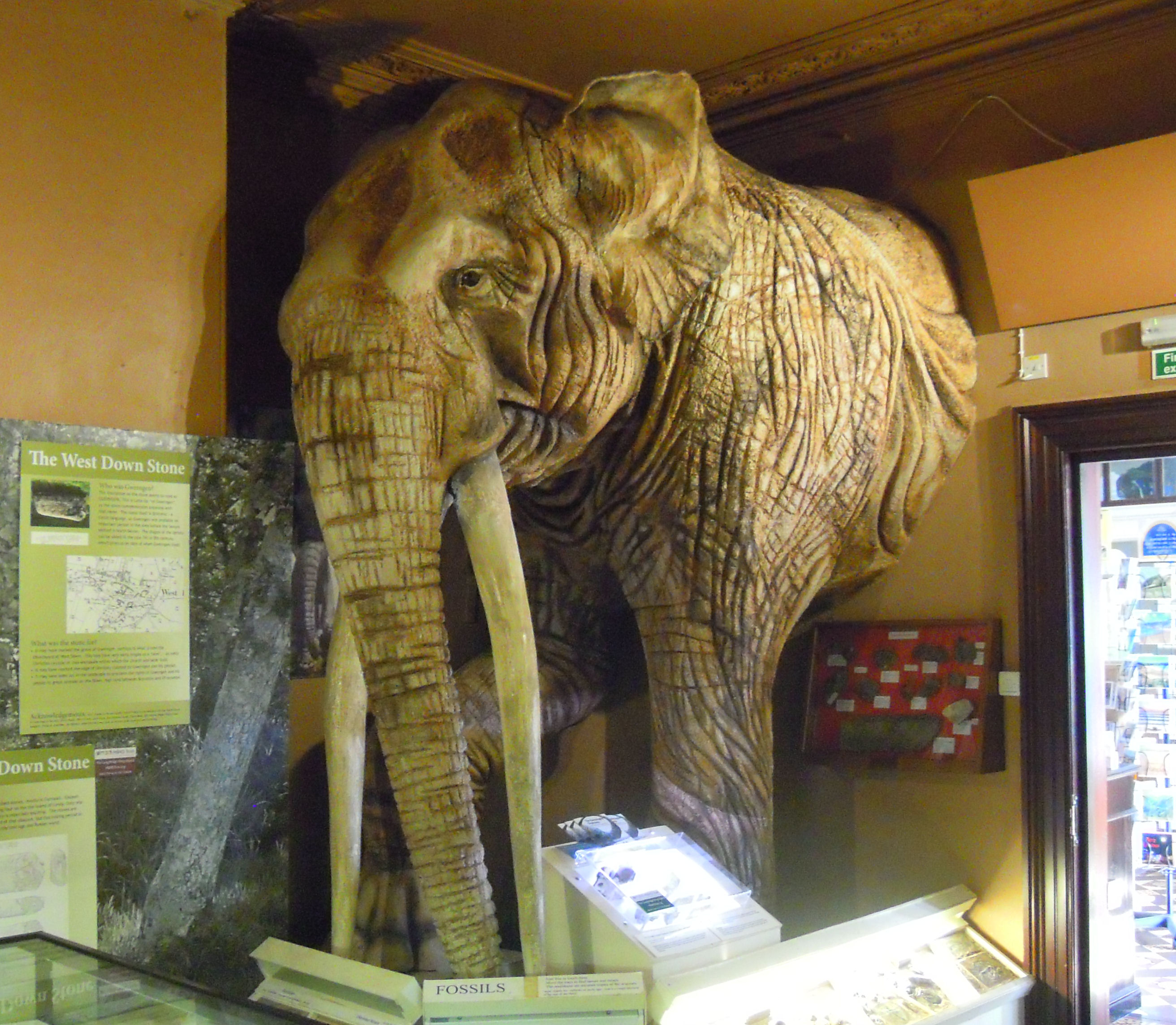
Full-size recreation of The Barnstaple Elephant

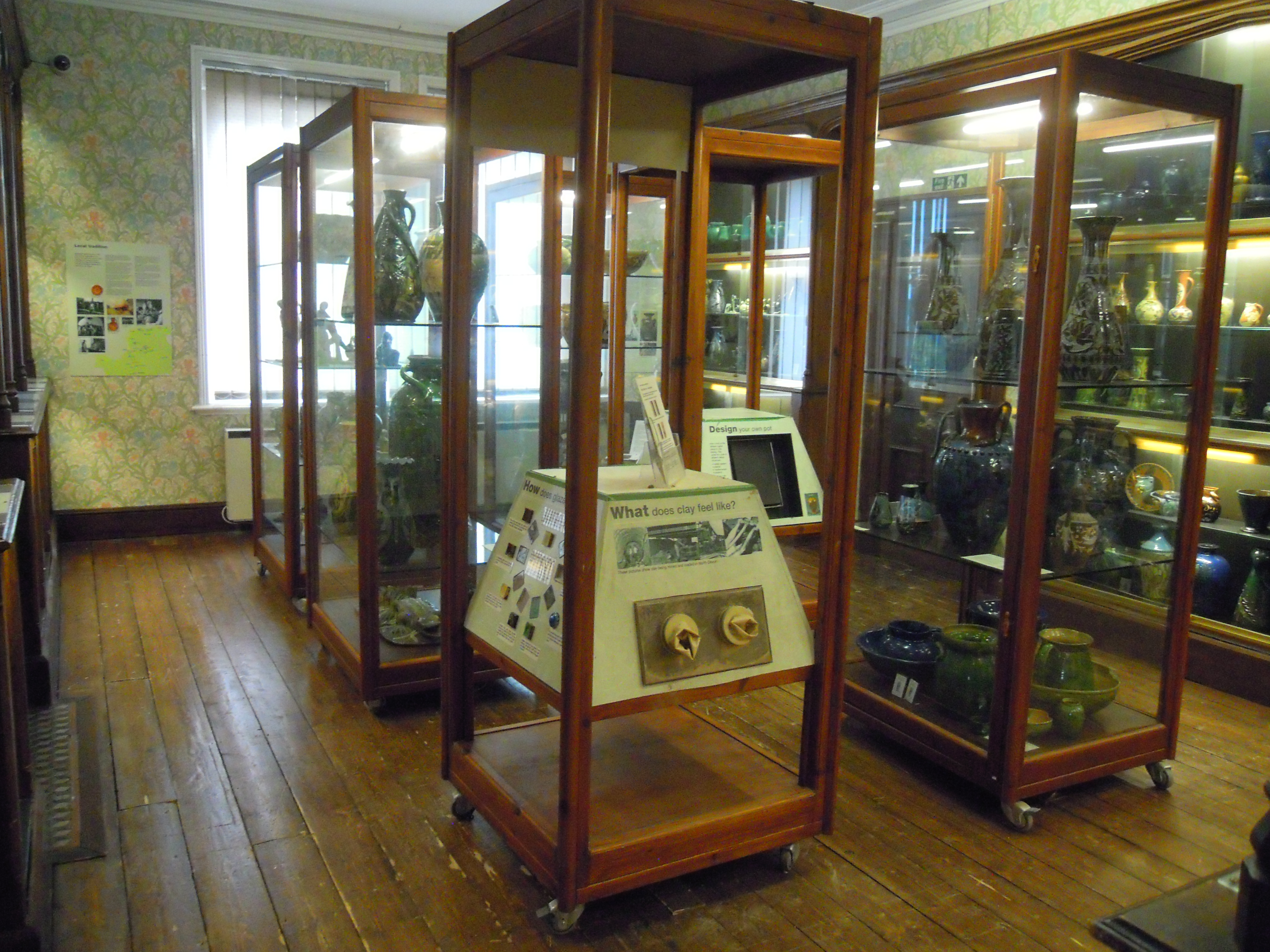
The Ceramics Gallery

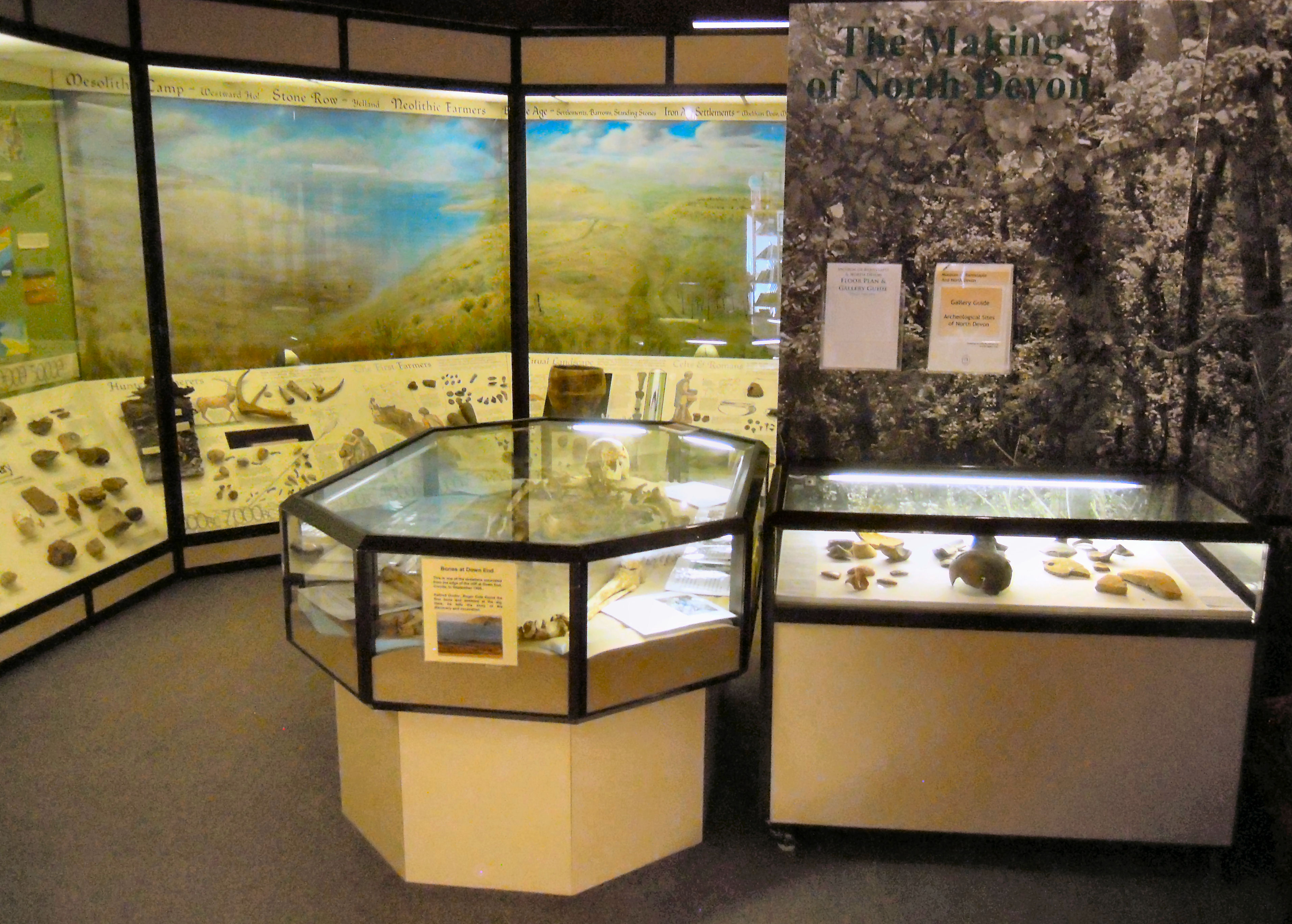
The Prehistory Gallery

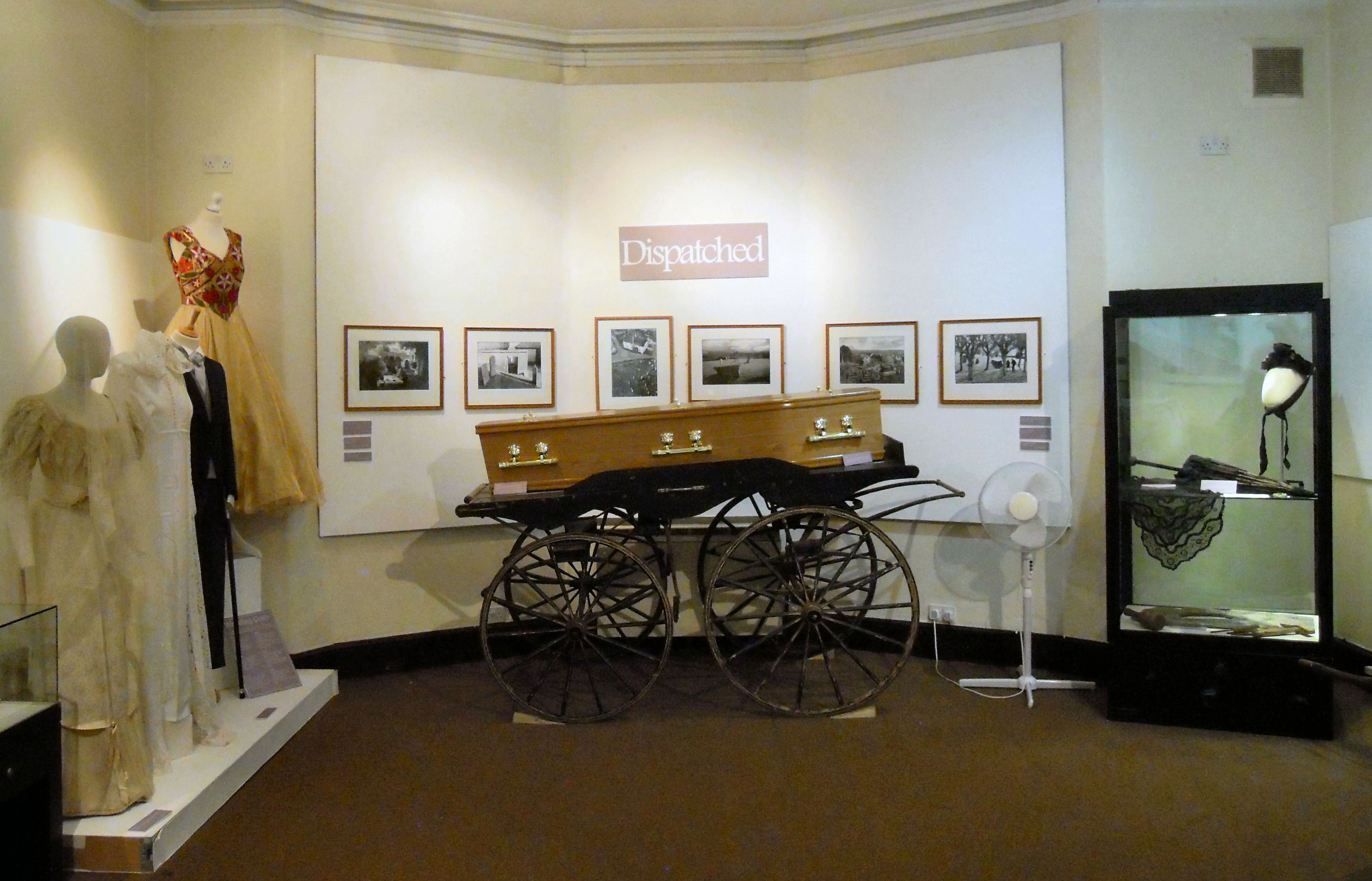
The Exhibition Gallery

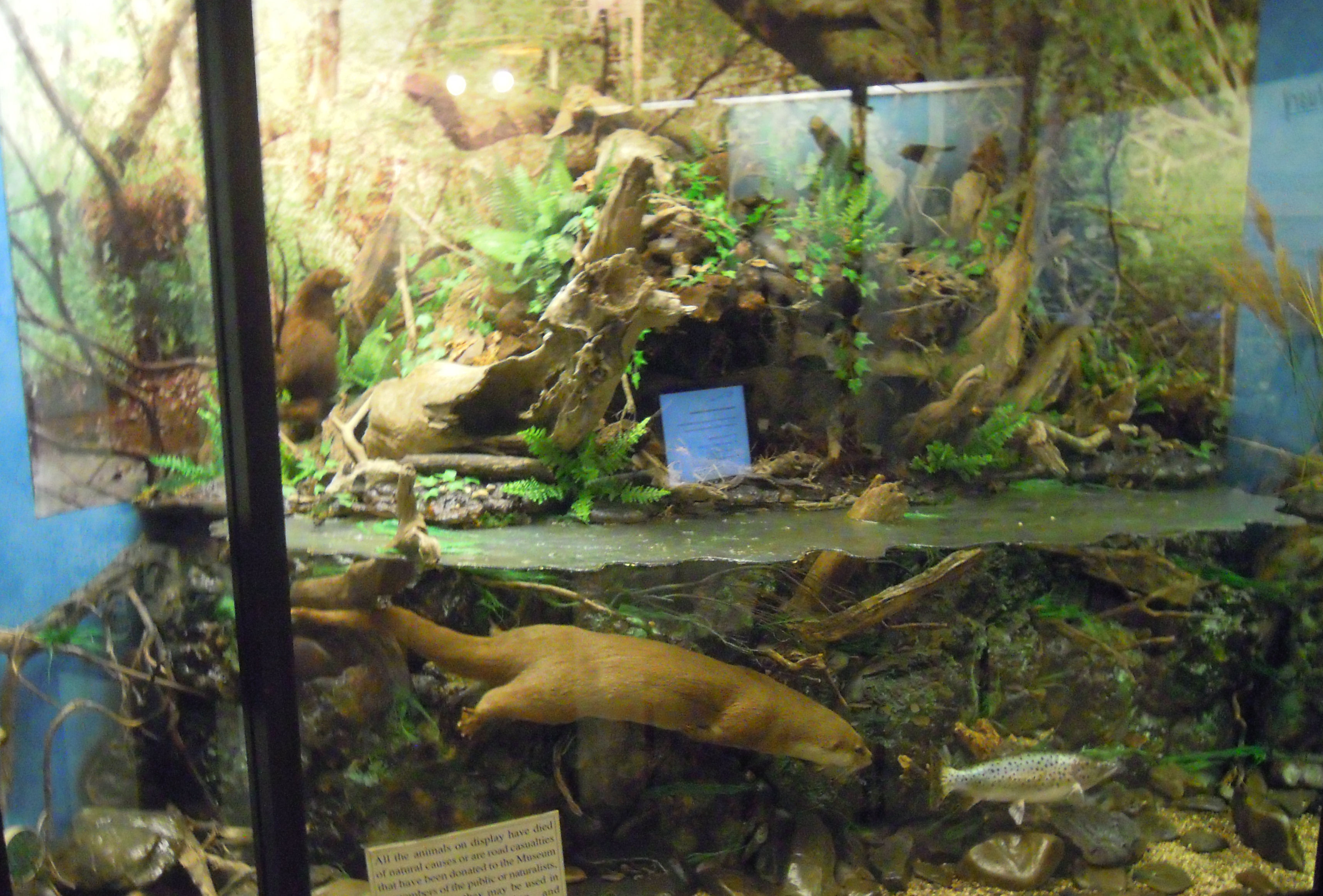
The Tarka Trail

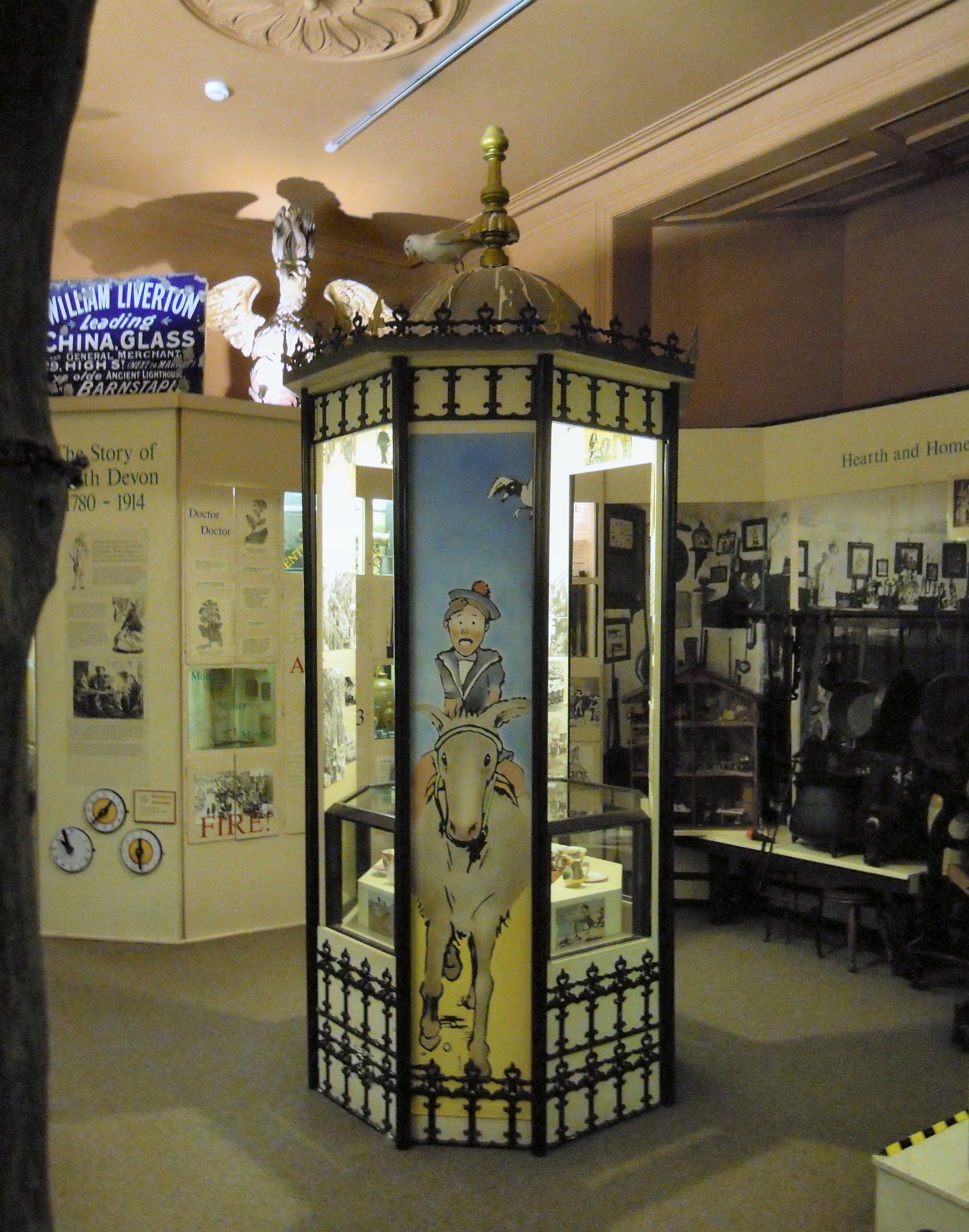
The Victorian Gallery

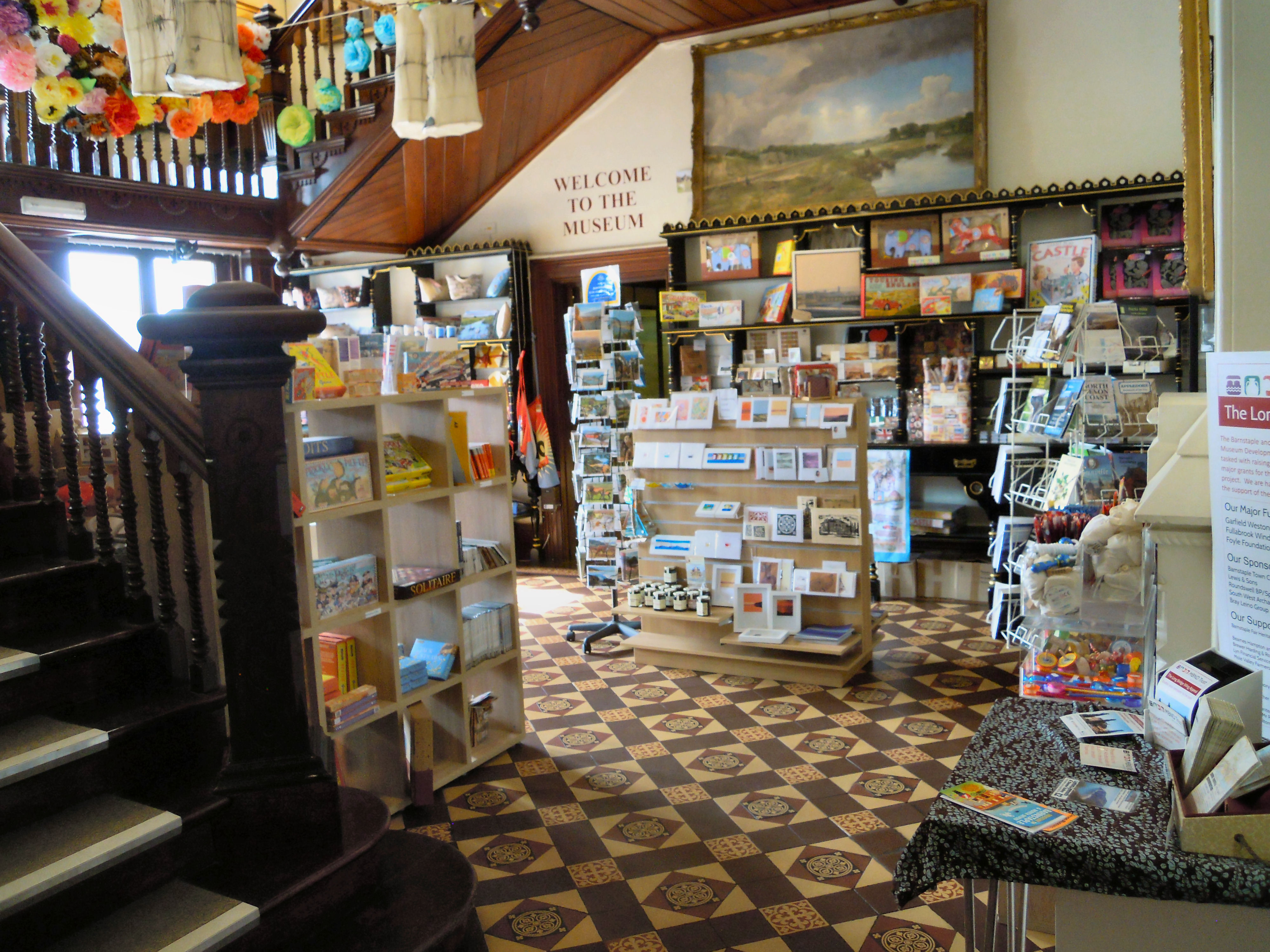
The Museum Shop
