= Shapland & Petter =

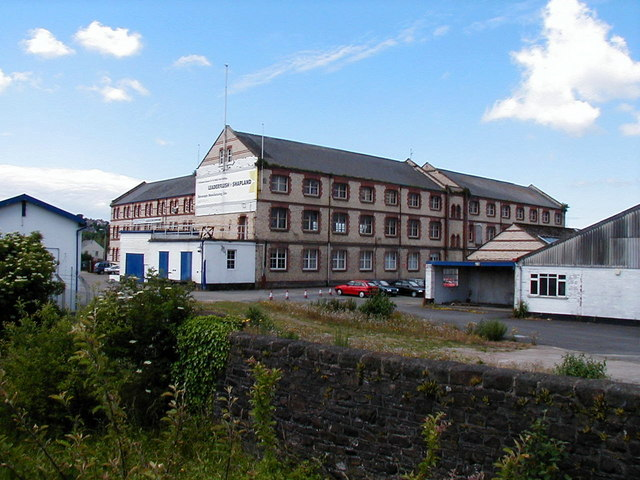
The former Shapland & Petter factory, Barnstaple in 2001

Shapland & Petter were furniture and architectural doorset manufacturers in Barnstaple, Devon, England. Before being taken over by the LS Group in 1999, Shapland & Petter was the largest privately owned employer in Devon, with a staff of approximately 900 during the 1990s. All operations at Barnstaple ceased in 2016 as the LS Group was wound up and the riverfront site was earmarked for redevelopment.

== History ==
Henry Shapland had been apprenticed to a cabinet maker in Barnstaple, before travelling to America in 1851 and learning about a wave moulding machine. Back in England he was joined by Henry Petter. By 1888 the Raleigh Cabinet Works were employing hundreds of workers from Raleigh and the surrounding areas when on 5 March 1888 a fire destroyed the factory. The factory was restarted at a new site on the River Taw, a former shipbuilding yard known as Bridge Wharf. Working together as Shapland and Petter they were to become one of the town's largest employers. Although much of their output was "Arts and Crafts" in design in no way did it emulate the aspirations of William Morris, et al. They employed craftsmen but also used the most up-to-date machinery available for their products. Henry Shapland was a time-served cabinet maker and Henry Petter was an amazing salesman who found the market for their products.

During World War I the firm produced shell cases, ammunition boxes and aeroplane propellers in addition to their normal furniture production.

A collection of the company's products is displayed at the Museum of Barnstaple and North Devon.

== See also ==
"Oliver Buildings at the Former Shapland and Petter Factory", Historic England, https://historicengland.org.uk/listing/the-list/list-entry/1427989?section=official-list-entry
