= William Frederick Rock =

William Frederick Rock

William Frederick Rock (29 January 1801 – 8 February 1890) was a British publisher and philanthropist.

== Early life ==
Rock was born in Barnstaple to Henry and Prudence Rock. William was an elder child and older brother; he had two sisters, Ann (born 1804), Prudence (born 1810) and two brothers, Henry (born 1806) and Richard (born 1808). Another brother Charles and a sister Maria died as babies. His father was a shoemaker at 46 High Street and a freeman of the borough holding a right to vote. William came into contact with William Busk, a parliamentary contestant, who visited with the family. Busk took an interest in William and was able to present him to Christ's Hospital's London Bluecoat School, where he started in 1811.

== Career ==
On leaving school, Rock joined a bank in Bideford, but the job apparently did not suit him as he ran into trouble several times for composing verses at work. Rock resigned and went to London, where another ex-parliamentary candidate for Barnstaple, Alderman Atkins, offered him a job at his bank.

Later on Rock went to work with printer and inventor Thomas de la Rue where Rock was able to make enough money to start his own printing venture aided by his brothers. The business that specialized on publishing topographical, steel-engraved prints on pictorial note paper, fancy stationery, maps and playing cards, as well as books and booklets, prospered and Rock became a wealthy man.

Throughout the years Rock had several setbacks; for instance, in 1859 his factory at 11 Walbrook burned down. However, despite these he founded several publishing imprints:

- 1821-1833: De La Rue, Rock & Co.
- 1833-1843: William & Henry Rock.
- 1844-1883: Rock Brothers & Payne.
- 1884: Rock Brothers Ltd.

Rock Brothers became known for publishing the Queen's Album of Margate in Leporello album form. In 1883, Rock celebrated his 50th anniversary of being in the publishing business at a dinner at The Crystal Palace.

== Philanthropic activities ==
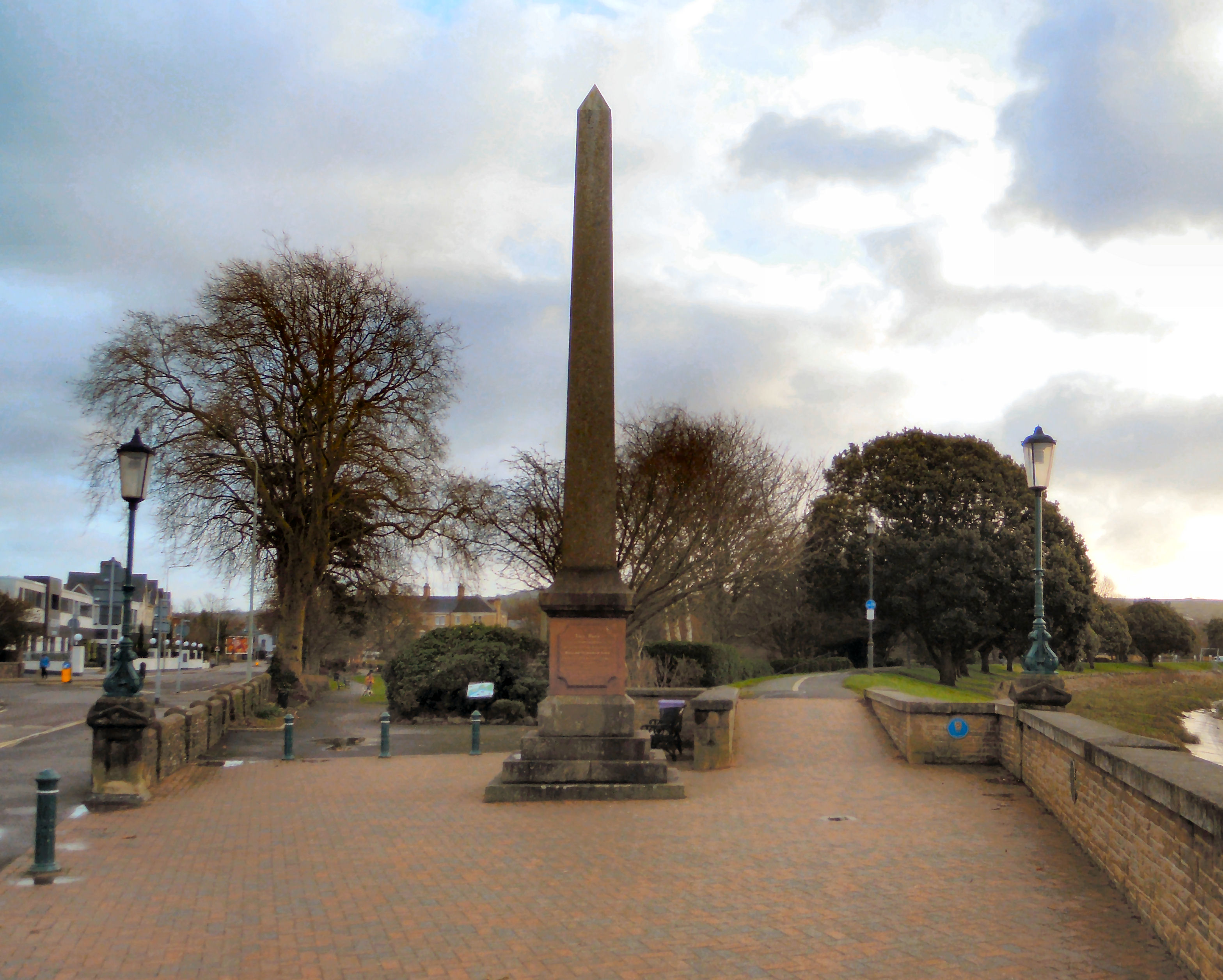
Obelisk commemorating Rock's gift of Rock Park in Barnstaple at the town-side entrance to the park.

In 1884 Rock sold the Rock Brothers Ltd. to Dickinson & Co. and retired. With no wife or children to support, he decided to give generously to his birthplace, Barnstaple, and became engaged in multiple philanthropic activities. In 1845 he founded the Barnstaple Literary and Scientific Institution and then in 1888, the North Devon Athenæum. He also financed the purchase of land for Rock Park in Barnstaple and he set up a convalescent home in Mortehoe.

William Frederick Rock died at home in Hyde Cliff, Blackheath, Kent on 8 February 1890. He bequeathed his collections to the North Devon Athenæum.

== Works ==
- Rock, William Frederick. Winter gatherings: poems. London: W. Kent & Co., 1877. 174 pp.
