= List of places in Plymouth =

This is a list of the suburbs, landmarks and selected other places located within the city of Plymouth, England.

== Suburbs ==
- Barne Barton
- Belliver
- Cattedown
- Compton
- Crabtree
- Crownhill
- Deer Park
- Derriford
- Devonport
- Drake
- Efford
- Eggbuckland
- Ernesettle
- Estover
- Glenholt
- Greenbank
- Ham
- Hartley
- Hooe
- Honicknowle
- Keyham
- King's Tamerton
- Laira
- Leigham
- Lipson
- Manadon
- Mannamead
- Marsh Mills
- Milehouse
- Millbay
- Millbridge
- Morice Town
- Mutley
- North Prospect
- Pennycomequick
- Pennycross
- Peverell
- Plympton
- Plymstock
- Roborough
- St Budeaux
- Southway
- Stoke
- Stonehouse
- Tamerton Foliot
- West Hoe
- Weston Mill
- Whitleigh
- Widewell
- Woolwell

== Landmarks ==
- The Barbican
- Dolphin Inn
- Drake's Island
- Eddystone Lighthouse
- Forts of Plymouth
- Mayflower Steps
- Mount Batten
- Plymouth Breakwater
- Plymouth Hoe
- Plymouth Sound
- Royal Albert Bridge
- Saltram House
- Smeaton's Tower
- Tamar Bridge
- The Royal Citadel

== Other places ==
- Bovisand
- Cattewater
- Central Park
- Derriford Hospital
- Devonport Dockyard
- Drake Circus Shopping Centre
- Ford Park Cemetery
- Hamoaze
- Home Park
- Life Centre
- National Marine Aquarium
- Plymouth College
- Plymouth Gin Distillery
- Stonehouse Creek
- Torpoint Ferry
- Union Street
- University of Plymouth
- Victoria Park

== See also ==
- List of wards in Plymouth
