= Island House =

Island House may refer to the following structures:

== United Kingdom ==
- Derwent Island House, Derwent Water, Keswick, Cumbria
- Island House, Belle Isle in Windermere
- Island House, Birmingham, West Midlands
- Island House, Laugharne, Grade II* listed, partly Tudor, sub-medieval town house located in Laugharne, Carmarthenshire
- Island House, Barbican, a Grade II listed building in Plymouth, Devon
- Island House, Plympton, a Grade II listed building in Plymouth, Devon

== Other places ==
- Island House, Hong Kong
- The Island House, Elk Rapids, Michigan, U.S.

== See also ==
- House Island (disambiguation)
