= Plymouth Castle =

Fortification built in the early 15th century

Coordinates: 50.365866°N 4.134511°W

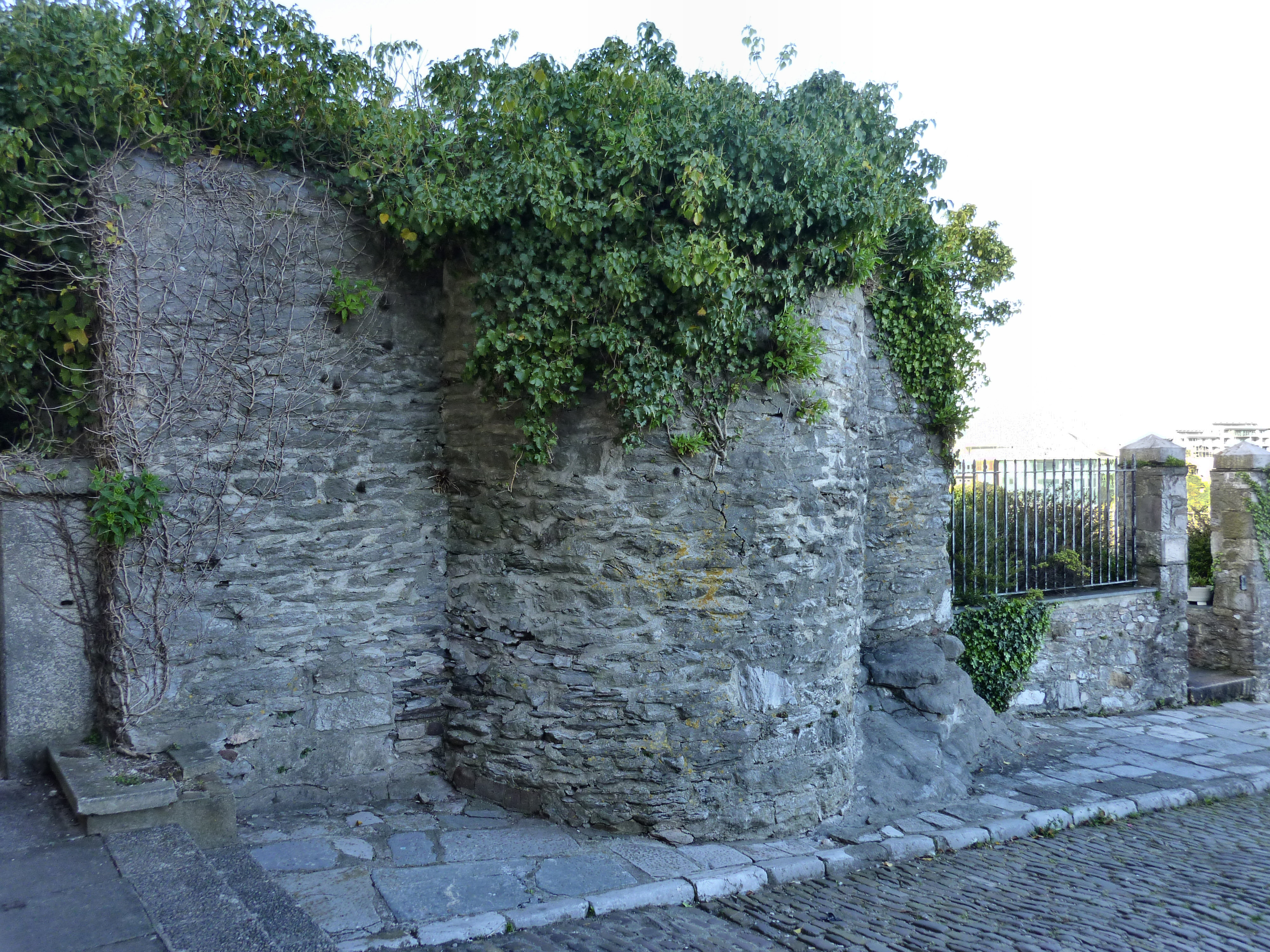
The surviving fragment of the castle

Plymouth Castle was a castle built in the early 15th century to defend the town and harbour of Plymouth in Devon, England. By the end of the 16th century it had ceased to have any military function and fell into disrepair, being almost completely demolished by the 19th century. Only a small fragment of an outer gatehouse remains.

== History ==
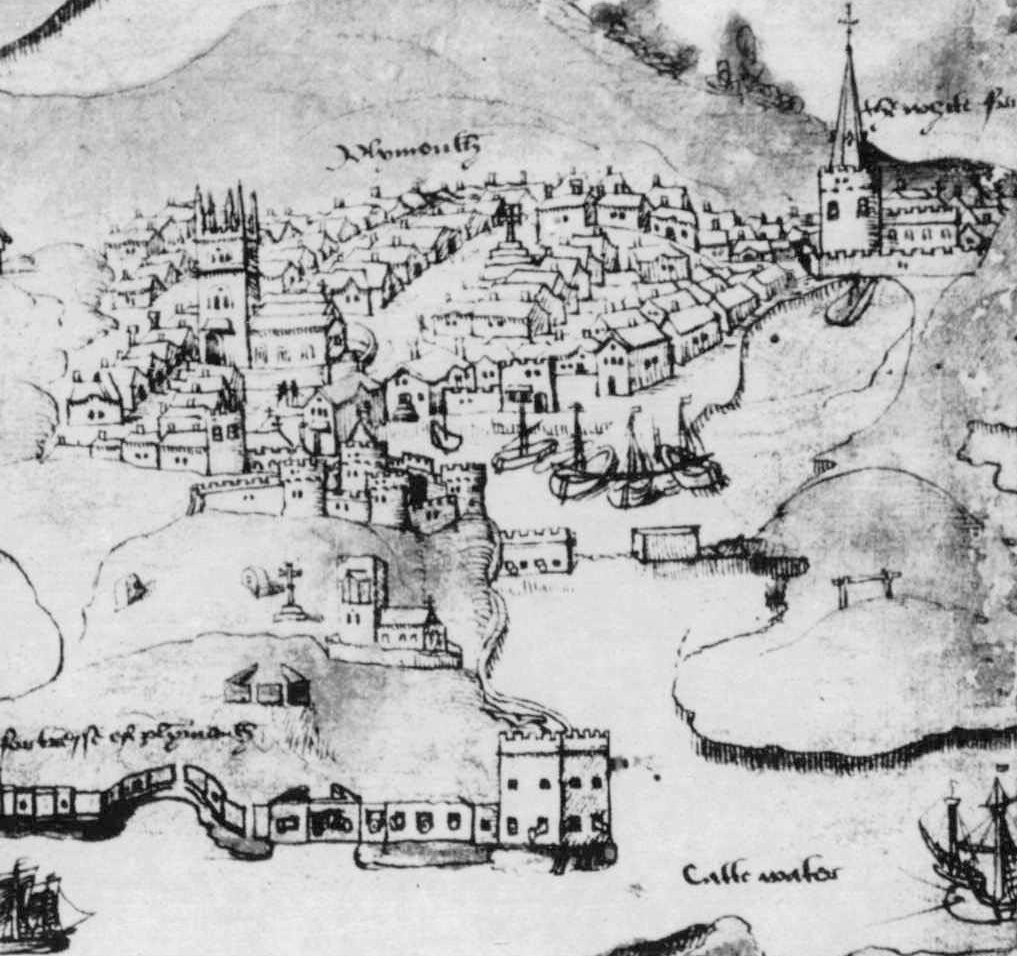
Plymouth Castle (on the left of the ships in Sutton Harbour) depicted on a map dated 1540.

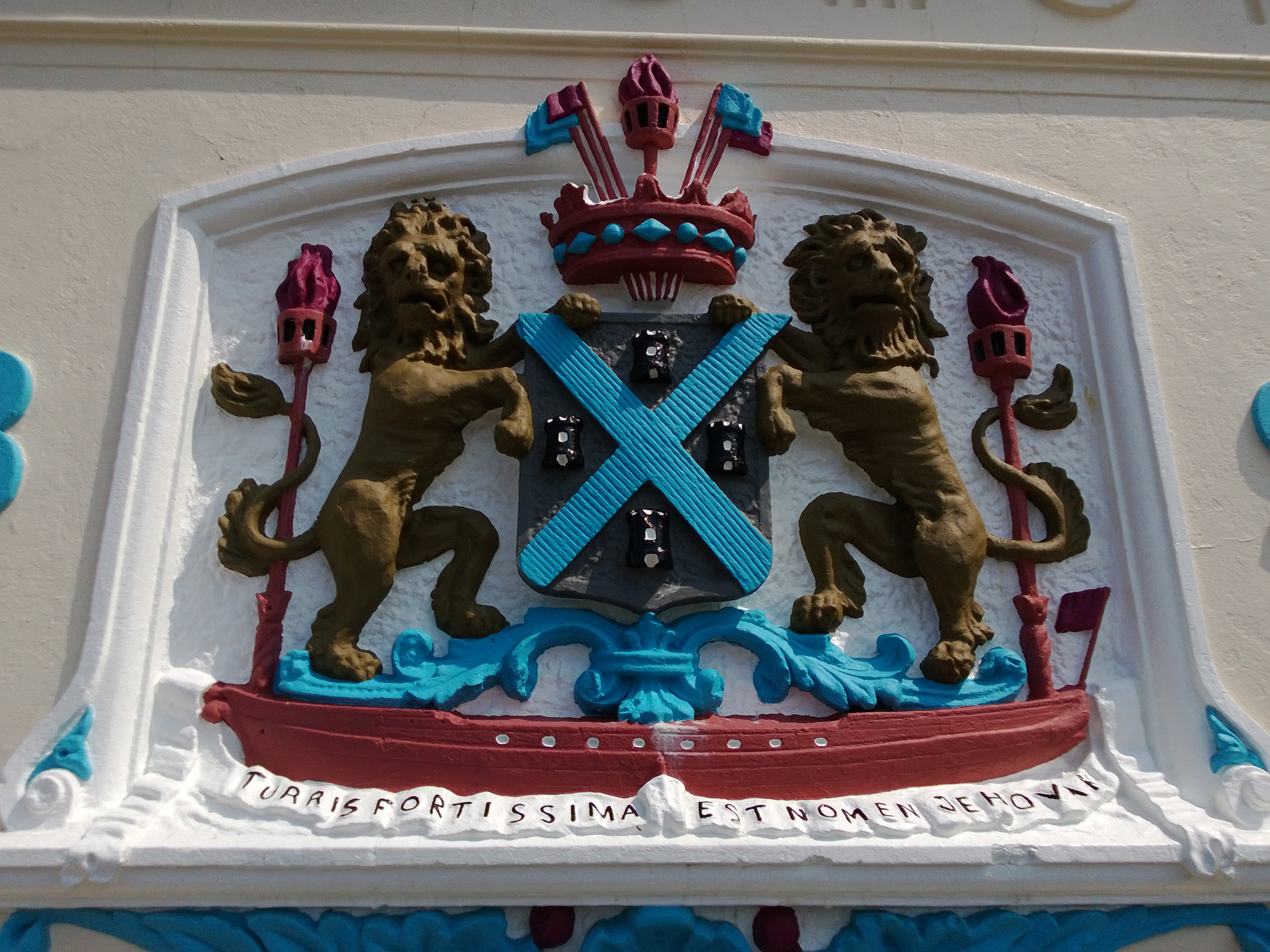
The coat of arms of the City of Plymouth show the four towers of Plymouth Castle with the saltire of Saint Andrew. The motto, Turris Fortissima est Nomen Jehova means "The strongest tower is the name of Jehovah".

At the time of the Norman Conquest in 1066, Plymouth, then known as Sutton, was too small a settlement to warrant fortification, but a motte and bailey castle was built at nearby Plympton. As the value of the natural harbour, Sutton Pool, and the size of the town increased, so in 1377, a murage grant was received to fund its fortification. The exact date of the construction of the castle itself is uncertain, but following a French raid on Plymouth in August 1403, King Henry IV ordered the prior of Plympton and the abbot of Tavistock to further fortify the town with walls and towers. No finance seems to have been forthcoming from the Crown and Edmund Lacey, the Bishop of Exeter, later granted indulgences to those who made contributions towards the cost of the project. Instead of town walls, the defences took the form of a quadrangular castle with four towers. It was not the seat of a powerful baron or a royal constable like a traditional castle, but it was commanded by the town's mayor and the defence of it was in the hands of the aldermen, each of the four wards of the town being responsible for one of the four towers. These are the four towers represented in the city's coat of arms to this day.

In 1542, the antiquary John Leland visited Plymouth and recorded that: "On a rokky hill hard by it [the mouth of the harbour] is a strong castel quadrate having a eche corner a great rounde tower. It semeth to be no very old peace of worke". During the Prayer Book Rebellion of 1549, the castle provided a refuge for the town's officials. Although the castle was manned again in preparation for the Spanish Armada in 1588, Francis Drake obtained royal funding for a modern artillery fort further south on the eastern end of Plymouth Hoe, which superseded the castle as the main defence of the harbour. During the English Civil War, Plymouth declared for Parliament and was besieged in 1643 by Royalist forces; the castle was again made ready for defence but saw no action. The castle was later used as a prison, then as a workhouse and finally as a source of building material for the expanding town.

== Surviving remains ==
A small section of the castle fabric survives in the Barbican area of Plymouth, located in Lambhay Street, at the head of a flight of stairs leading down to the Mayflower Steps on the quayside. It is thought to be a section of an outer gatehouse called the "South Port". The remains consist of a short length of thick rubble wall 3 metres high, with a central semicircular projection, the remains of a turret of the gatehouse. It is a Grade II listed building and a Scheduled Ancient Monument.

== See also ==
- Fortifications of Plymouth
