= Cattewater =

Coordinates: 50°21′44″N 4°07′40″W

The entrance to the Cattewater as seen from Plymouth Hoe, with the Royal Citadel on the left and Mount Batten on the right

The city of Plymouth, in Devon, England, is bounded by Dartmoor to the north, the Hamoaze to the west, the open expanse of water called Plymouth Sound to the south, and the River Plym to the east. The lowest reach of this river, just above the point where it empties into Plymouth Sound, is known as the Cattewater.

Sutton Pool, the original harbour of Plymouth, is reached from the Cattewater. Apart from an occasional small oil tanker, the waterway is now used mostly by fishing trawlers, yachts, and smaller pleasure craft. There is a water taxi that runs from the Mayflower Steps in Plymouth's Barbican district to Mount Batten and Oreston on the southern shore.

Both the Cattewater and the district of Cattedown, which lies on its northern shore, are thought to take their names from a feature of the local topography that resembled a cat in some way, though the identity of this feature has long been forgotten. The spelling Cattewater is not old or consistent. Local sources and texts, together with early maps and drawings, refer to the estuary variously as Catwater, Cat Water and Catt Water.

== See also ==
- Cattewater Wreck
- Laira
