= Plymouth Gin =

Type of gin

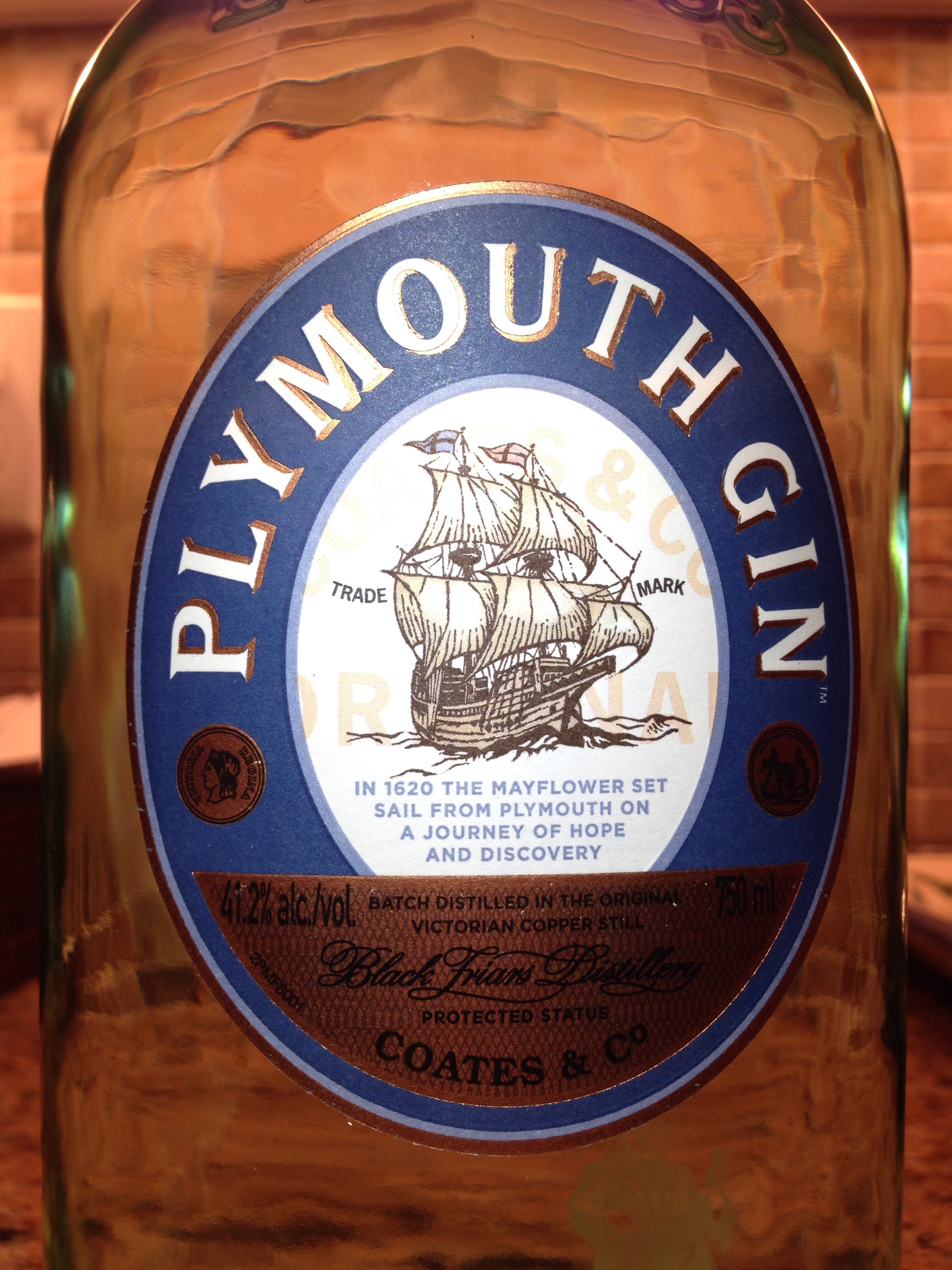
- Label on a Plymouth Gin bottle
- Type: Gin
- Manufacturer: Pernod Ricard
- Origin: England
- Introduced: 1793
- Alcohol by volume: 41.2%
- Proof (US): 72 (U.S. 83)
- Website: www.plymouthgin.com

Plymouth Gin is a protected brand of gin that has been distilled on the same premises on the Barbican in Plymouth, Devon, since 1793. The site of production, the Plymouth Gin Distillery, was built in 1431 and is reputed to have once been a monastery of the Dominican Order, widely known as "Black Friars". For this reason, it has traditionally been called the "Black Friars Distillery", and this name appears embossed on bottles. Plymouth-style gin is considered a derivative of London Dry, distinguished by a more "earthy" taste profile. and featuring more citrus notes.

Plymouth Gin was the only spirit made in England, and one of only three gins in the world, that carried a geographical indication (GI) designation with the European Union, certifying its traditional origin. In 2015, the distillery's owners declined to pursue renewal of the GI, considering its protection was unneeded. This leaves only Gin de Mahón from Spain and Vilniaus Džinas (Vilnius gin) from Lithuania to carry GI status.

== Product ==
The Plymouth Original Strength brand of gin is 41.2% alcohol by volume (ABV). While the botanicals used in Plymouth Gin (juniper, coriander, cardamom, orange, lemon, orris and angelica) are common to many gins, its flavour differs from the more common style of gin, London Dry. A higher proportion of root ingredients and other botanicals is used in the Plymouth recipe, which brings what is described as a more 'earthy' feel to the gin, as well as a softened juniper flavour, and noticeable citrus notes. It is often noted as being "drier" than London Dry (for example by Bon Appetit; the beverage website Cocktail Society) although some writers note a subtle "sweetness". At least one reviewer considers it is "less dry" than London Dry. A 47% ABV (94 U.S. proof) version is distributed worldwide.

Plymouth also make a 'navy strength' variety of Plymouth Gin, which is 57% ABV (100° English proof), being the traditional strength demanded by the British Royal Navy. It was a tradition in the Royal Navy that all newly commissioned vessels receive a "Plymouth Gin Commissioning kit", a wooden box containing two bottles of navy strength Plymouth gin and glassware.

According to the distiller's website, Plymouth also produces a sloe gin, a gin fruit cup and a "limited edition" single-origin juniper gin as of 2021.

== Background ==
Black Friars Distillery in Devon

In the first half of the 18th century, as a result of government policy and economic conditions, gin became a low-cost and readily available alcoholic beverage. It was widely consumed by the poor and was generally believed to be a major contributor to the considerable social problems of the time, in what became known as the Gin Craze. Among those advocating for reforms that would address the situation was William Hogarth, whose 1751 engraving, Gin Lane, formed part of his campaign. It illustrated the calamitous social ills ascribed to the use of gin.

The negative reputation arising from these circumstances, coupled with the often poor quality, adulterated product of unregulated distilling, positioned gin as an undesirable beverage even decades after "anti-gin" legislation (notably, the Gin Act 1751), along with the reduced economic viability of using grain for alcohol production, had substantially reduced the adverse impacts of the "craze".

In contrast, Plymouth Gin was viewed more favourably. The product was standardised and reliable, while its distillation occurred far from the slums of London where substandard gin had most often been both made and imbibed. The global deployment of the Royal Navy, who carried it on their ships, led to the renown and wider consumption of the Plymouth product. While use of gin in general declined in England from the 1750s, the Plymouth-style was somewhat insulated from the falling consumption and low regard which distilled grain spirits had acquired in the aftermath of the Gin Craze.

Plymouth Gin was very popular in the first part of the 20th century. Thirty-two gin-based cocktail recipes in the Savoy book of cocktails name Plymouth Gin specifically. Plymouth was the favorite gin of film directors Alfred Hitchcock and Orson Welles, as well as the American President Franklin D. Roosevelt.

== Commercial history ==
Today, there is only one brand of Plymouth-style gin, the Plymouth brand, which is produced at the Black Friars Distillery in Devon. It is the only remaining gin distillery in Plymouth. The building, constructed in 1431, has been in operation as a gin distillery since 1793. It opens onto what is now Southside Street.

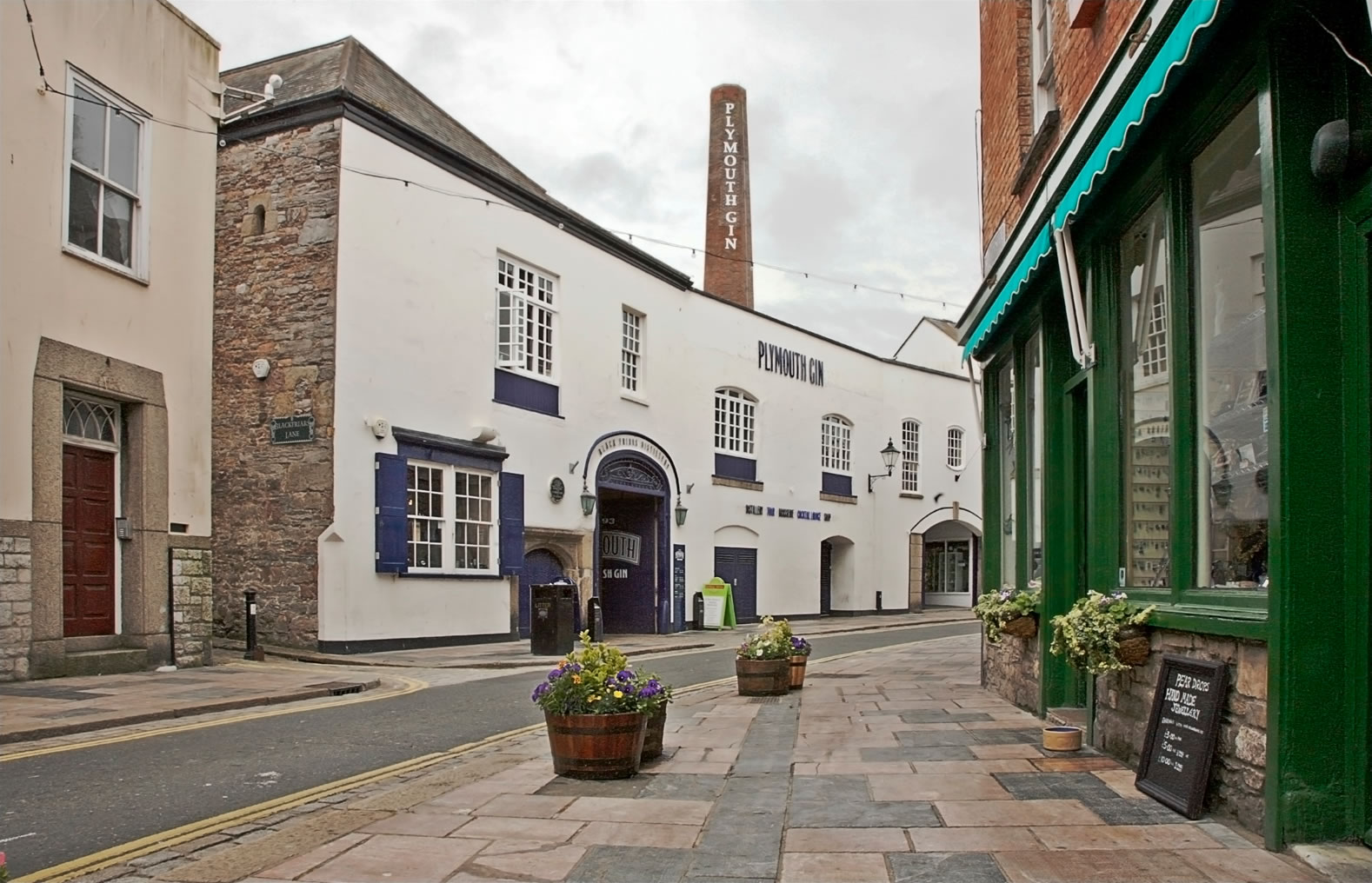
Plymouth Gin distillery

The established distilling business of Fox & Williamson began the distilling of the Plymouth brand in 1793. Soon the business became known as Coates & Co., which it remained until March 2004. The Plymouth brand of gin has been produced at the same Plymouth distillery using the same original recipe, with only brief interruption, since 1793.

By the 1990s, sales of gin across the board had declined substantially, and Plymouth Gin specifically was doing poorly, with sales down to 7,000 cases a year; its owner, Allied Domecq, was focusing on Beefeater Gin, its one-time rival that was by then owned by the same company. In 1996, the brand was sold by Allied Lyons to a management group headed by Charles Rolls.

In March 1998, the new owners initiated a brand re-launch, positioning it as a premium brand with new packaging that recreated the original bottle, including a mock-engraving of its thirsty monk mascot positioned toward the bottom of the bottle, referencing the brand motto "when his feet are dry it's time to buy."

After turning the company around, they sold it in 2005 to the Swedish company V&S Group, which also made Absolut Vodka. The brand is now owned and distributed by the French company Pernod Ricard as a result of its purchase of V&S in 2008.

The European Union (EU) granted Plymouth Gin (i.e., any gin of traditional style made in or near Plymouth), protected designation of origin (PDO) status. Under the GI scheme of the EU, the historical association of a food product with a region, and its traditional production, is codified and regulated. This gives protection from imitators not located within the designated places, or not using the approved methods of production, as such producers are not permitted to use the specified term for their products. Prior to the expiration of the PDO in February 2015, Pernod Ricard announced that they would not be applying for its continuation. The company considers it to be unnecessary for the gin's protected status, as they own the tradename, Plymouth Gin, and their Black Friars Distillery has been the sole maker of the style for over 100 years.

=== Packaging ===
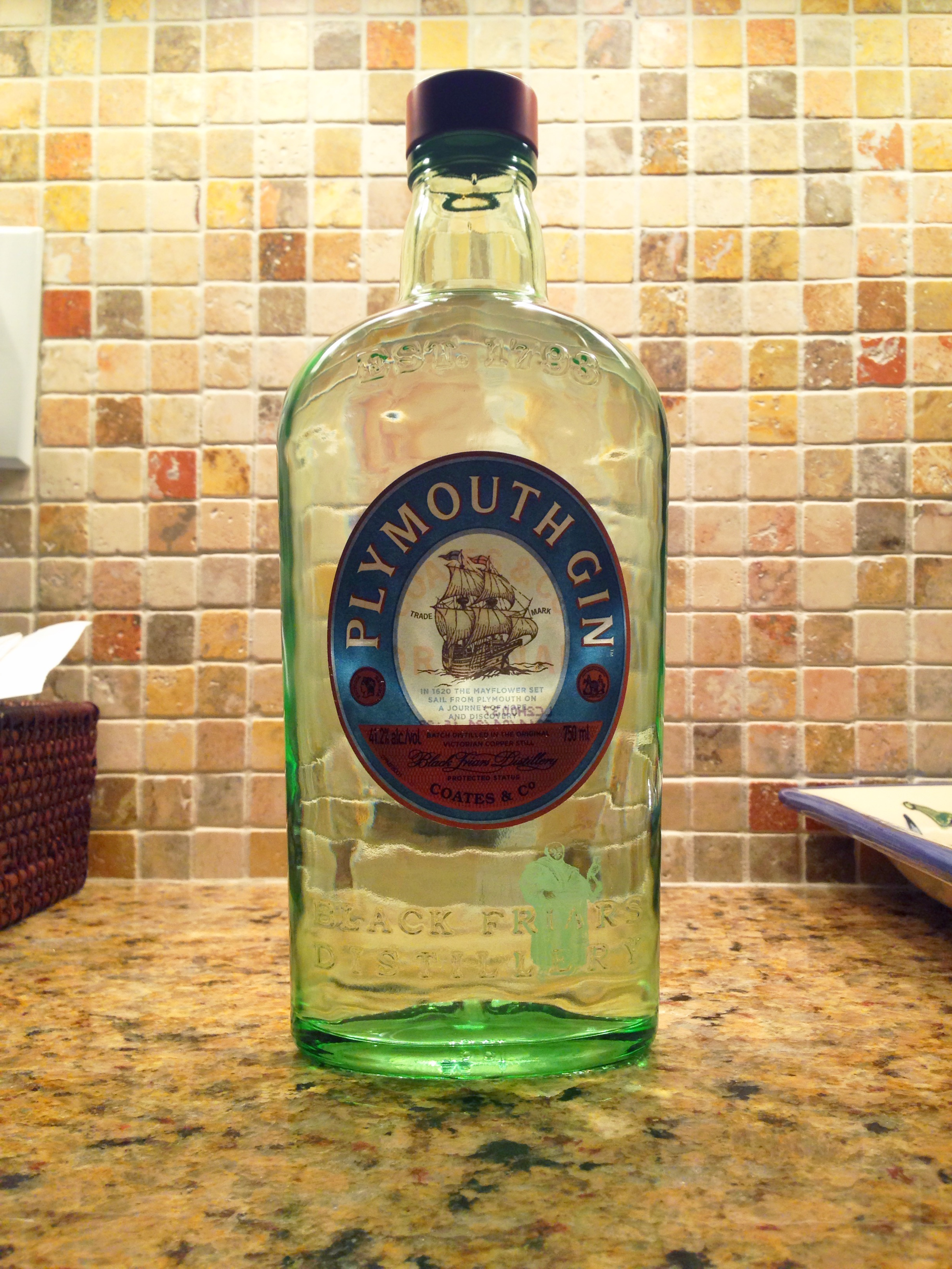
A Plymouth Gin bottle from c. 2014

In 1998, the brand was relaunched by the new management team. The new packaging involved a re-creation of the original bottle and included a thirsty monk inside the bottle. It was said that when the monk's feet 'got dry', it was time for a new bottle. It was also restored to its original strength of 41.2%, and a Navy Strength of 57% introduced to remind drinkers that the brand was the official gin for the Royal Navy.

In mid-2006, the bottle was changed by new owners V&S to an Art Deco style. The front of the bottle depicted the ship, Mayflower, based upon the fact that when the Pilgrim Fathers set out for their journey to the New World, bad sea conditions and damage forced them to put into Plymouth harbour for shelter and essential repairs. Local tradition has it that some of them stayed in the monastery, which later became the distillery. In the same way as the monk's feet had purportedly indicated the need for re-stocking, it was now said that it was time to get a new bottle when the Mayflower 'no longer sails on gin'. In January 2012, the packaging was again redesigned, this time returning to a more classical "shaving bottle" shape with a slightly green tint and the words "Est. 1793 – Black Friars Distillery" embossed on the front.

== Accolades ==
Plymouth's Original Gin has won several awards over the years, including four double gold, four gold, one silver, and two bronze medals at the San Francisco World Spirits Competition between 2006–2016. In 2016, Plymouth received double gold for its Plymouth Gin (Original Gin) and gold for its Navy Strength gin in this competition.

== See also ==
- Pink gin
