= Island House, Plympton =

Building in Plympton

Island House
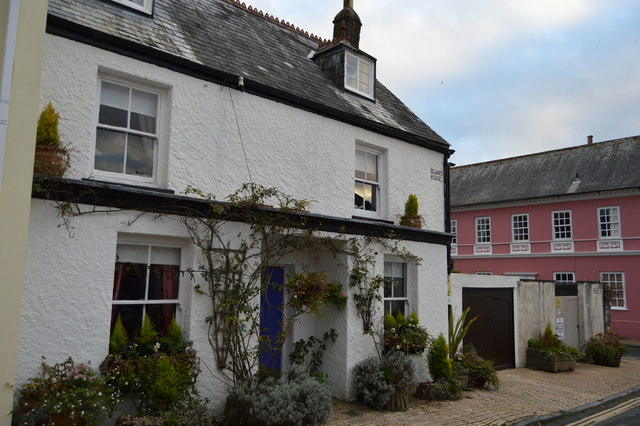
- The building in 2016. The Old Rectory, on Fore Street, is in the background

- Location within Devon Island House, Plympton (England)

General information
- Location: 4 Church Road, Plympton, Devon, England
- Coordinates: 50.38313°N 4.0473°W
- Completed: 18th century

Technical details
- Floor count: 2 (plus attic)

Island House is a Grade II listed building in Plympton, Devon, England. Standing at 4 Church Street, at the corner with Fore Street, Plympton's main street, it dates to the 18th century.
