= House Island =

House Island can refer to:

- House Island (Maine), a private island Portland Harbor in Casco Bay in Maine, United States
- House Island (Massachusetts), an island in Manchester Harbor in Massachusetts Bay, United States
- House Island, another name for Inner Farne Island
