= National Marine Aquarium, Plymouth =

Marine aquarium in the city of Plymouth, England

National Marine Aquarium
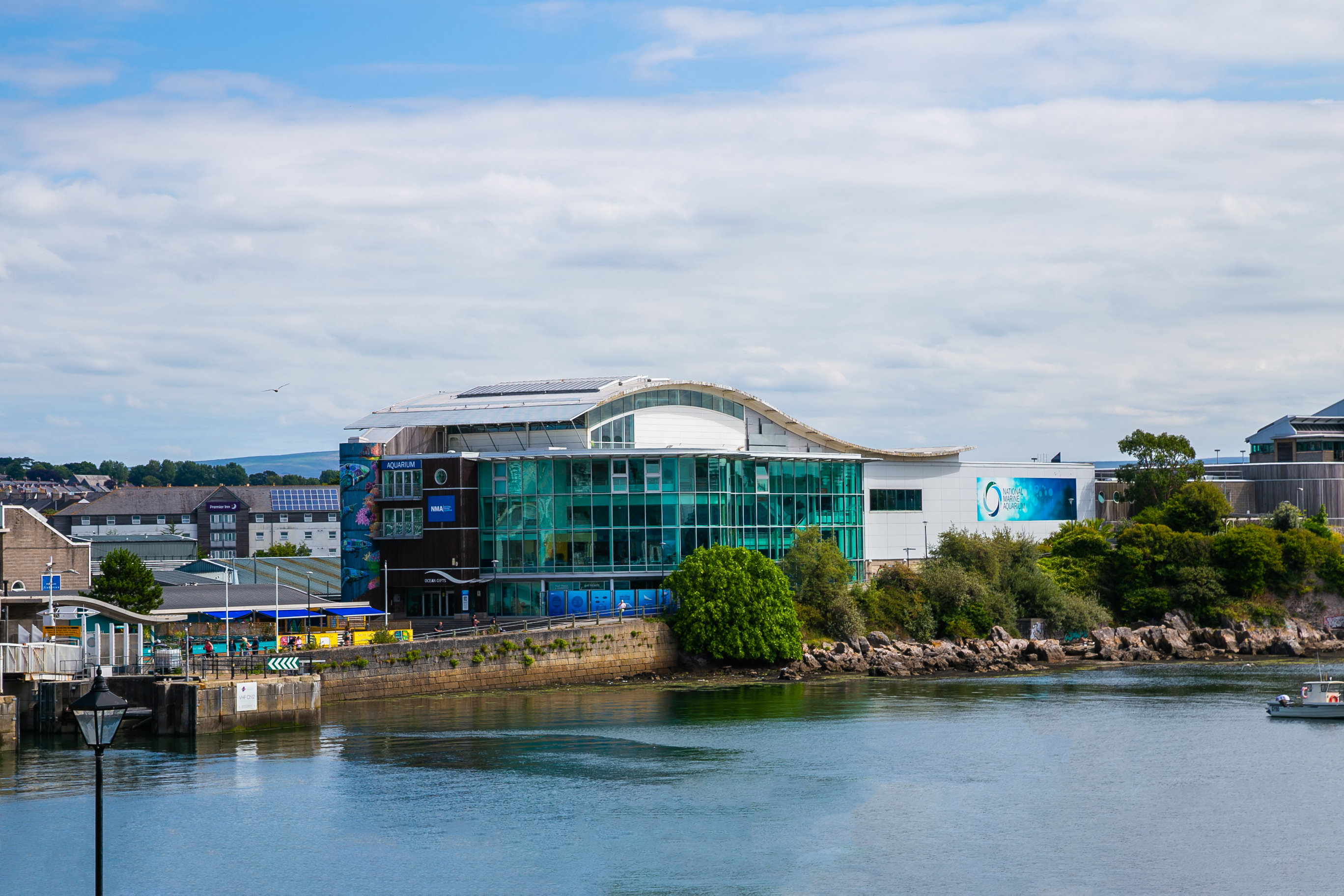
- Entrance to the National Marine Aquarium
- Interactive map of National Marine Aquarium
- 50.3666°N 4.1313°W
- Date opened: 1998
- Location: Plymouth, England
- No. of animals: 5,000
- No. of species: 400
- Volume of largest tank: 2,500,000 L (660,000 US gal)
- Memberships: BIAZA
- Major exhibits: 4 main zones
- Website: www.national-aquarium.co.uk

The National Marine Aquarium, which opened in May 1998, is situated in Plymouth in south-west England. It is the largest aquarium in the UK and houses over 5,000 animals.

It acts as an educational institution by teaching visitors about the marine environment. The National Marine Aquarium is run by the Ocean Conservation Trust, a charity dedicated to ocean conservation.

The marine aquarium is located in Sutton Harbour near the Barbican and fish market. It is a member of the British and Irish Association of Zoos and Aquariums (BIAZA).

== Exhibits ==
The Aquarium is divided into four main zones: Plymouth Sound, Eddystone Reef, Atlantic Ocean and Blue Planet.

=== Plymouth Sound ===
This zone displays a variety of marine life found in Plymouth Sound. There are 17 tanks, which are home to approximately 80 species of fish and invertebrates, including local sharks, rays, and octopus.

=== Eddystone Reef ===
The Eddystone Reef exhibit is the largest local sea life exhibit in Britain, housing life-size models of whales and dolphins located around the island. The large Eddystone tank displays animals found on the Eddystone reef, a reef 19km south of Plymouth.

=== Atlantic Ocean ===
This zone contains the 'Ocean Drifters' jellyfish exhibit and the largest tank in the aquarium. The 'Ocean Drifters' exhibit was opened in 2009, and includes moon jellies, Japanese sea nettles, and upside-down jellyfish, housed in round tanks to prevent injury. The largest tank of the aquarium houses 1,000 Caribbean fish. The tank volume is 2.5 million litres. This exhibit was updated at the end of 2009, with the largest ever shipment of live fish into the UK from Barbados. It was updated again in 2015 and 2016, with the addition of lemon and sand tiger sharks.

=== Blue Planet ===
This zone includes 'Biozone' and the 'Great Barrier Reef'. Biozone showcases the biodiversity found in the world's oceans and displays species such as; the longhorn cowfish, lionfish, giant Pacific octopus and seahorses. This zone also includes the second largest tank at 700,000 litres. It contains over 70 species of fish.

== Gallery ==
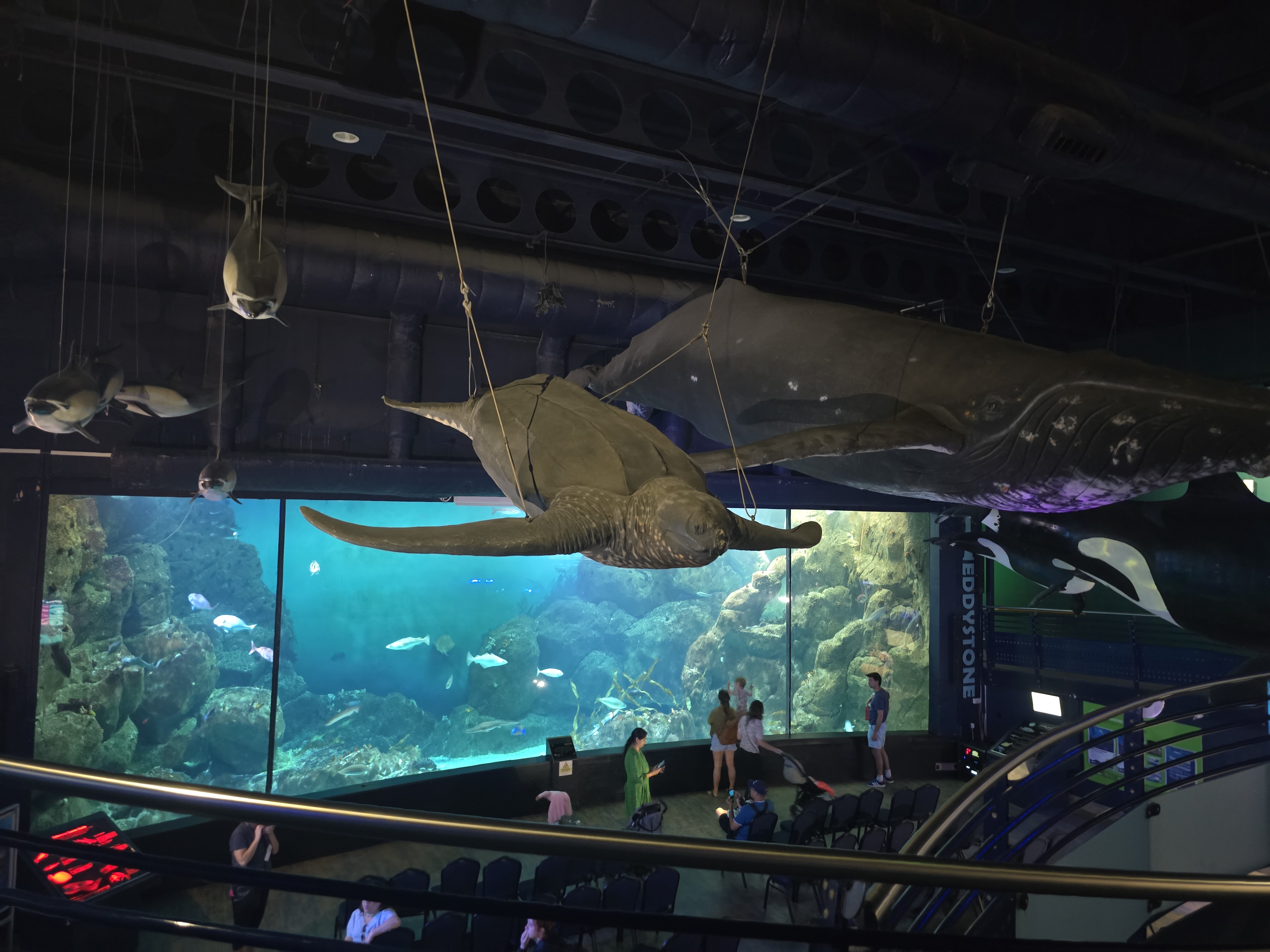
Eddystone Reef exhibit

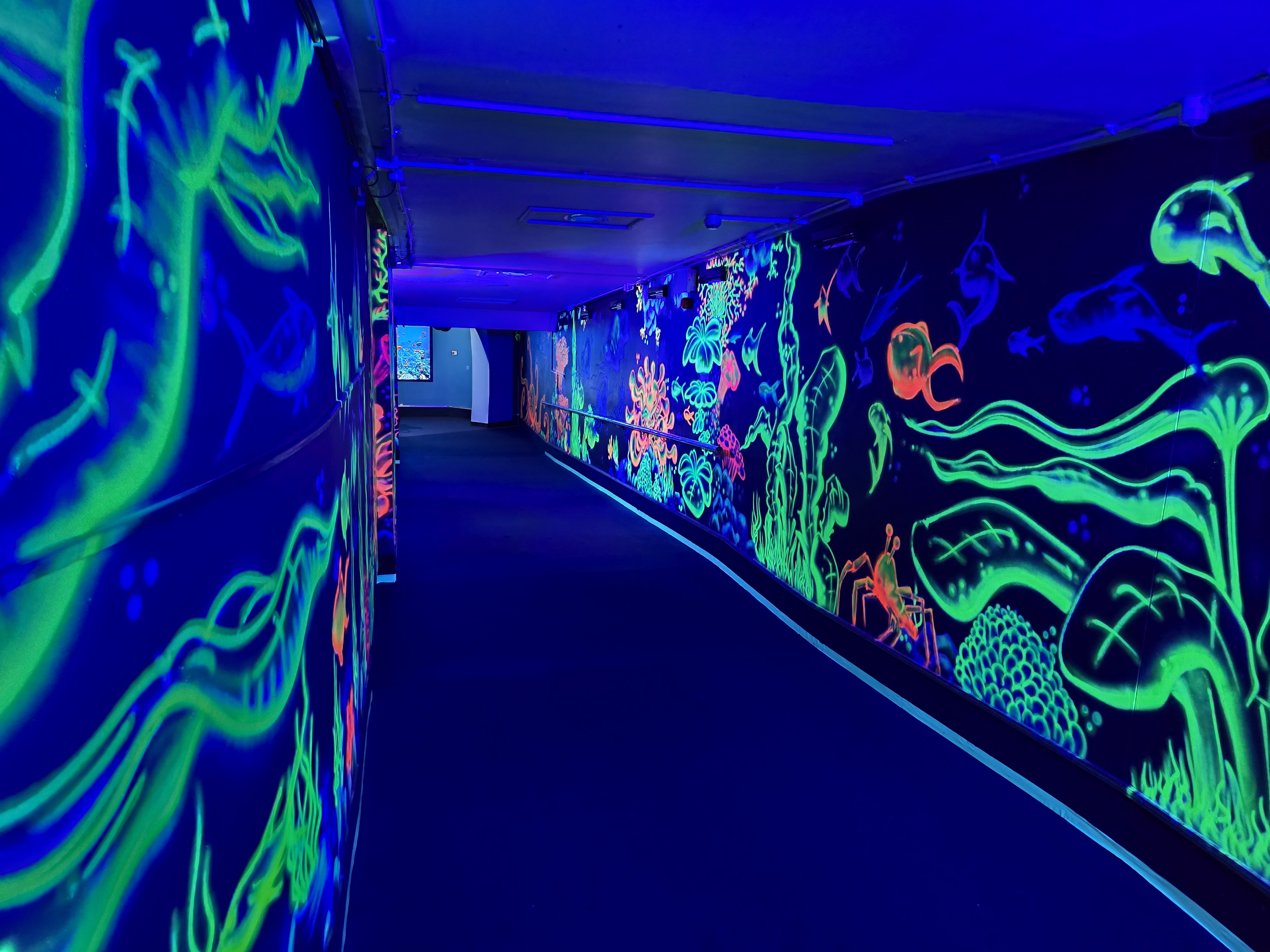

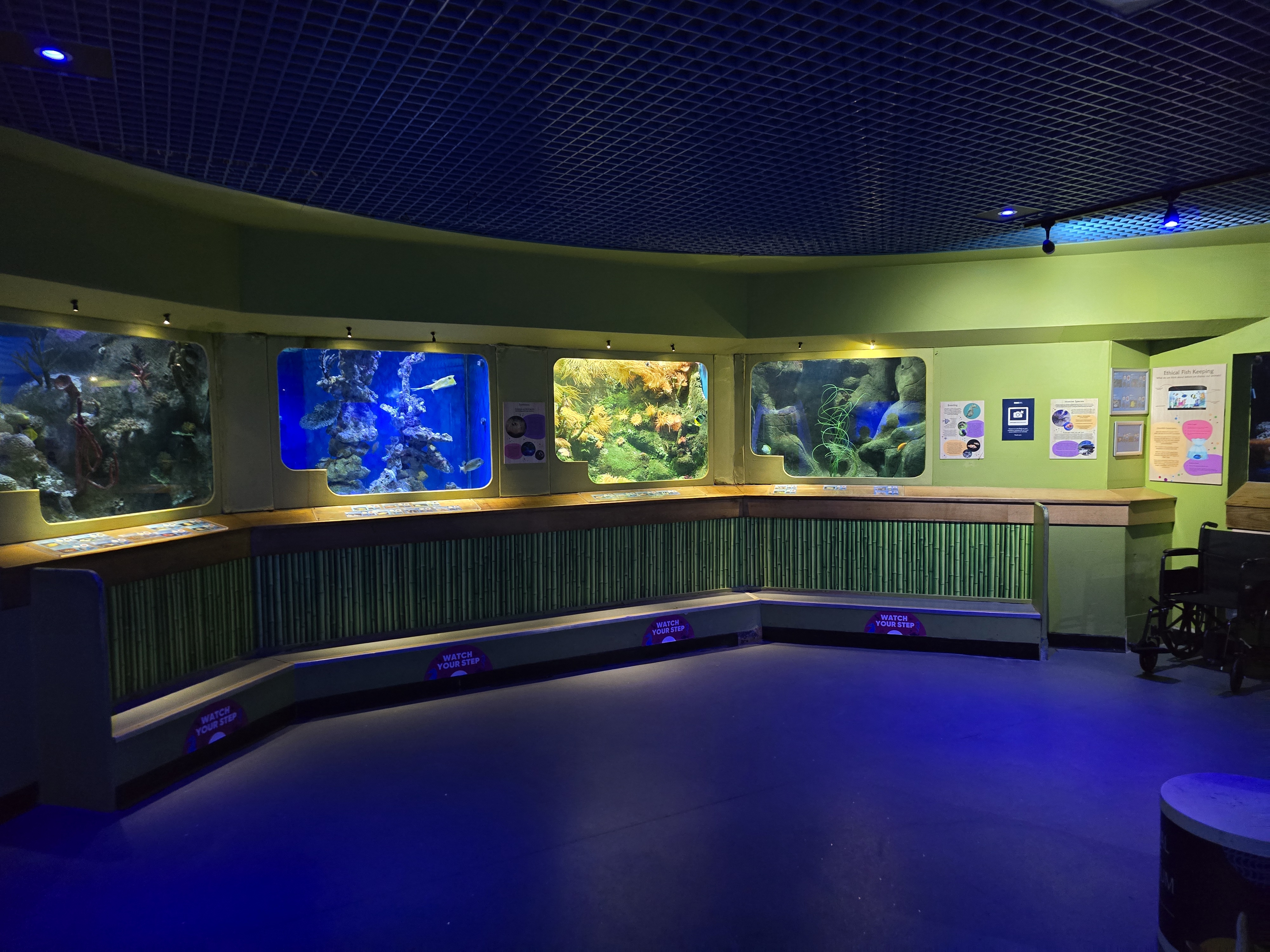
Fish tanks

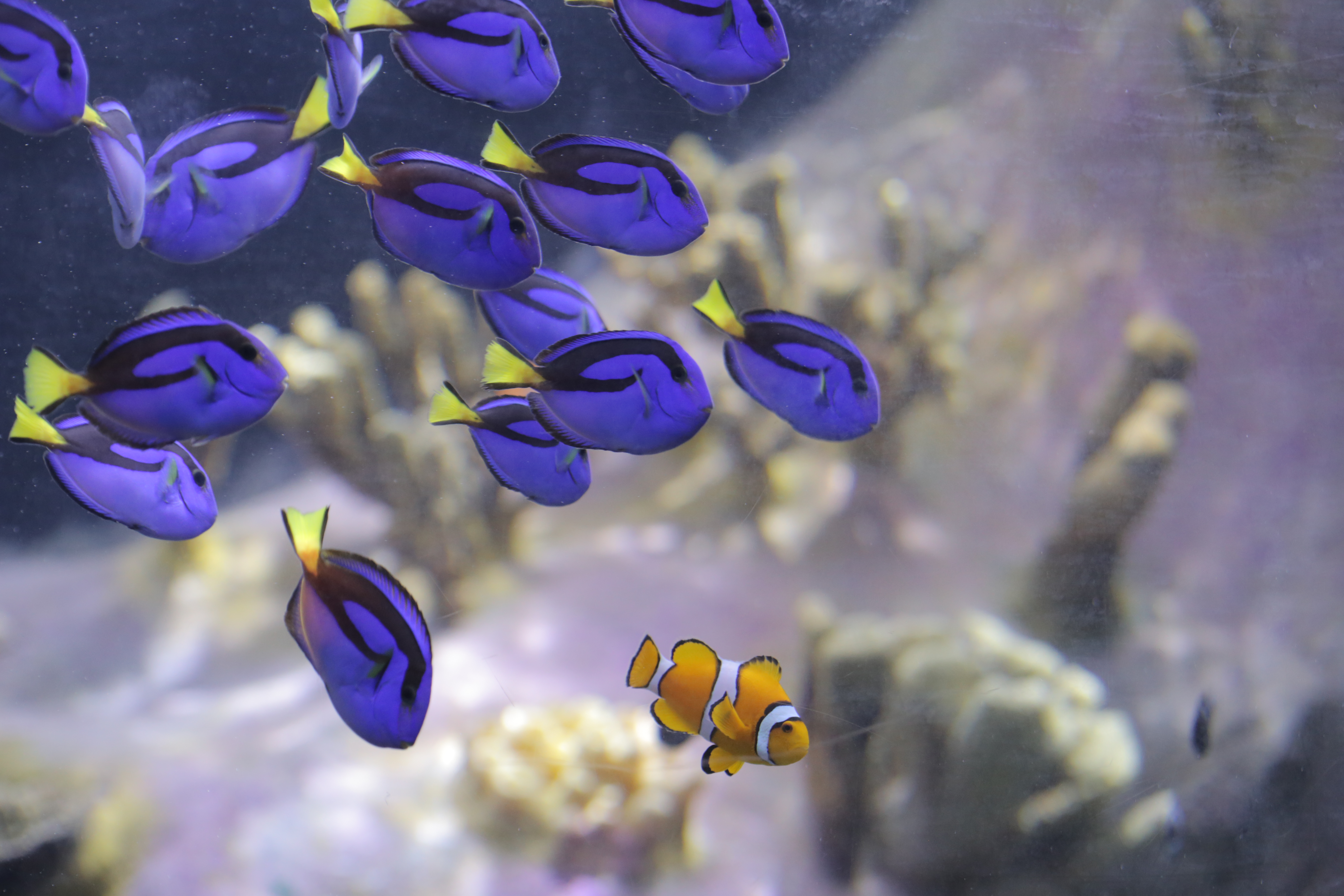
Coral reef fish

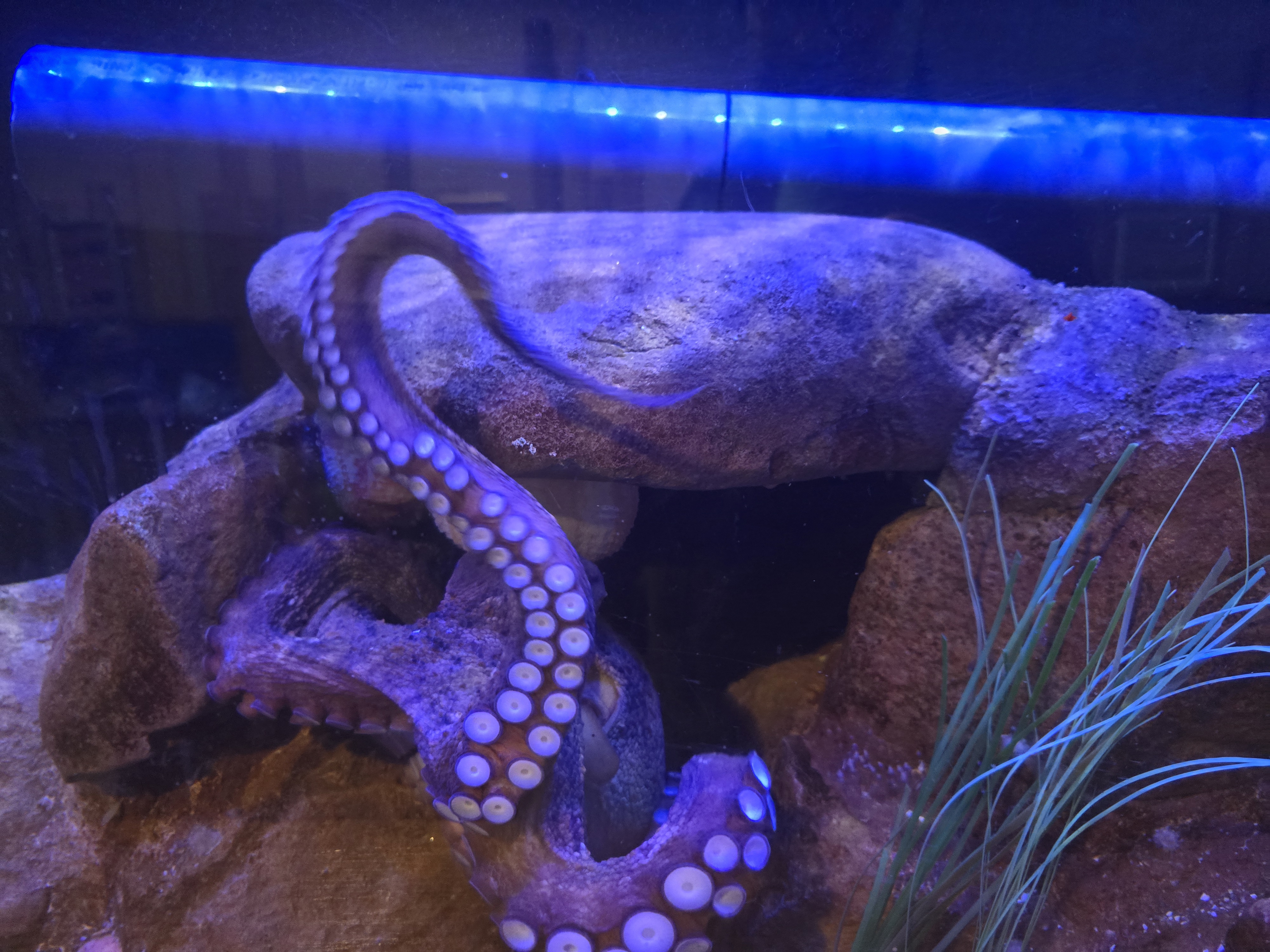
Octopus

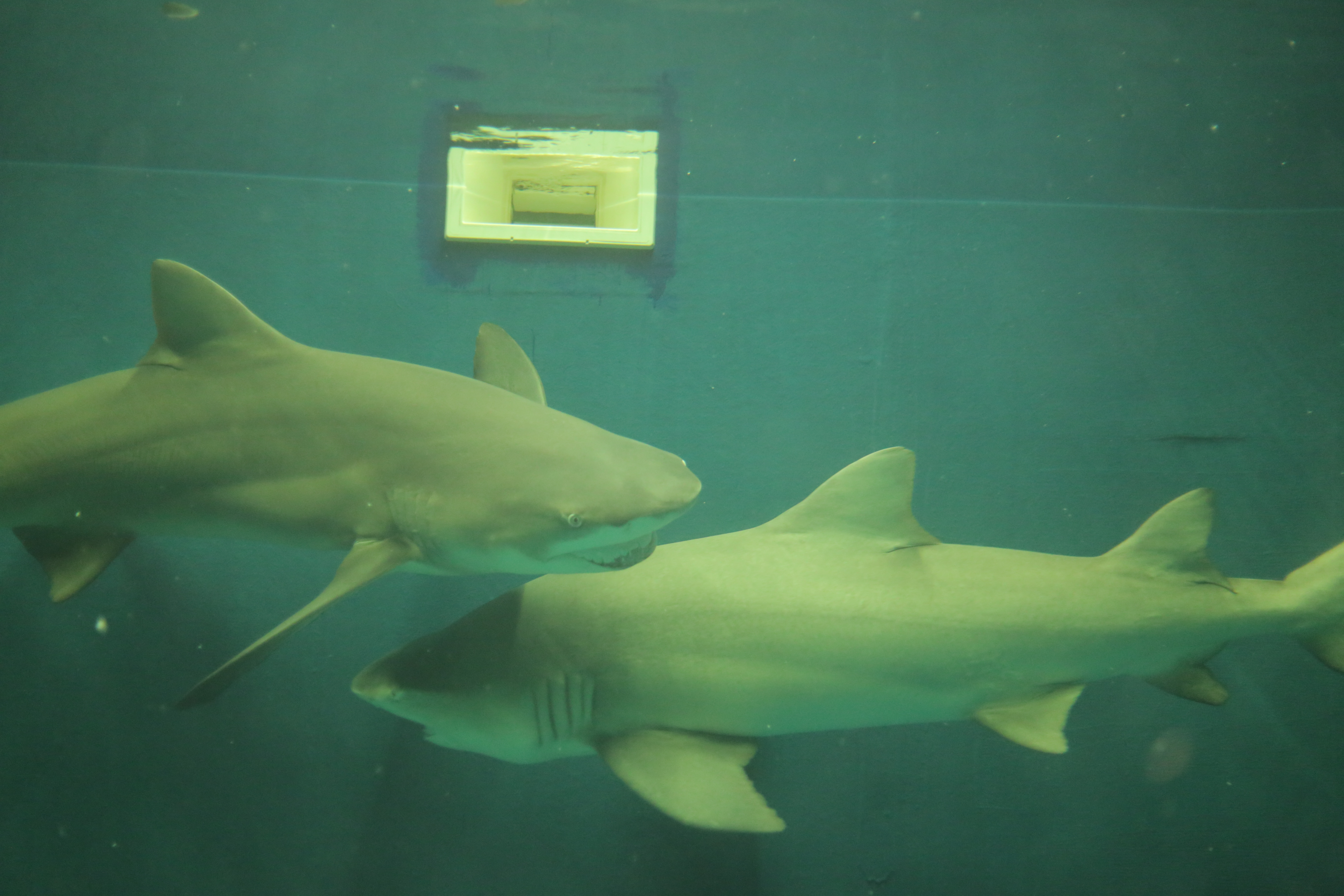
Sharks

== Conservation ==
The National Marine Aquarium was the first UK Aquarium to be set up specifically to further learning, research and conservation of the marine environment.

The Aquarium is run by the Ocean Conservation Trust, a global charity that exists to protect and restore the Ocean. Working across three core pillars – Ocean Advocacy, Ocean Habitats and Ocean Experiences.

The National Marine Aquarium led a project to sink frigate HMS Scylla in 2004 to create an artificial reef in Whitsand Bay, Cornwall.

== TV Show ==
In 2023, the National Marine Aquarium was the focus of the BBC Two documentary series Secrets of the Aquarium. The six-part series premiered on 14 November 2023 and followed the daily work of the aquarium’s staff and the care of the approximately 5,000 animals housed at the facility.

Produced by the Welsh production company Hall of Mirrors, the series also followed the aquarium’s involvement in conservation initiatives outside the facility, including seagrass protection projects and field work overseas. The programme was broadcast on BBC Two and made available on BBC iPlayer.
