= North Prospect =

Suburb of Plymouth, Devon

Coordinates: 50.391°N 4.164°W

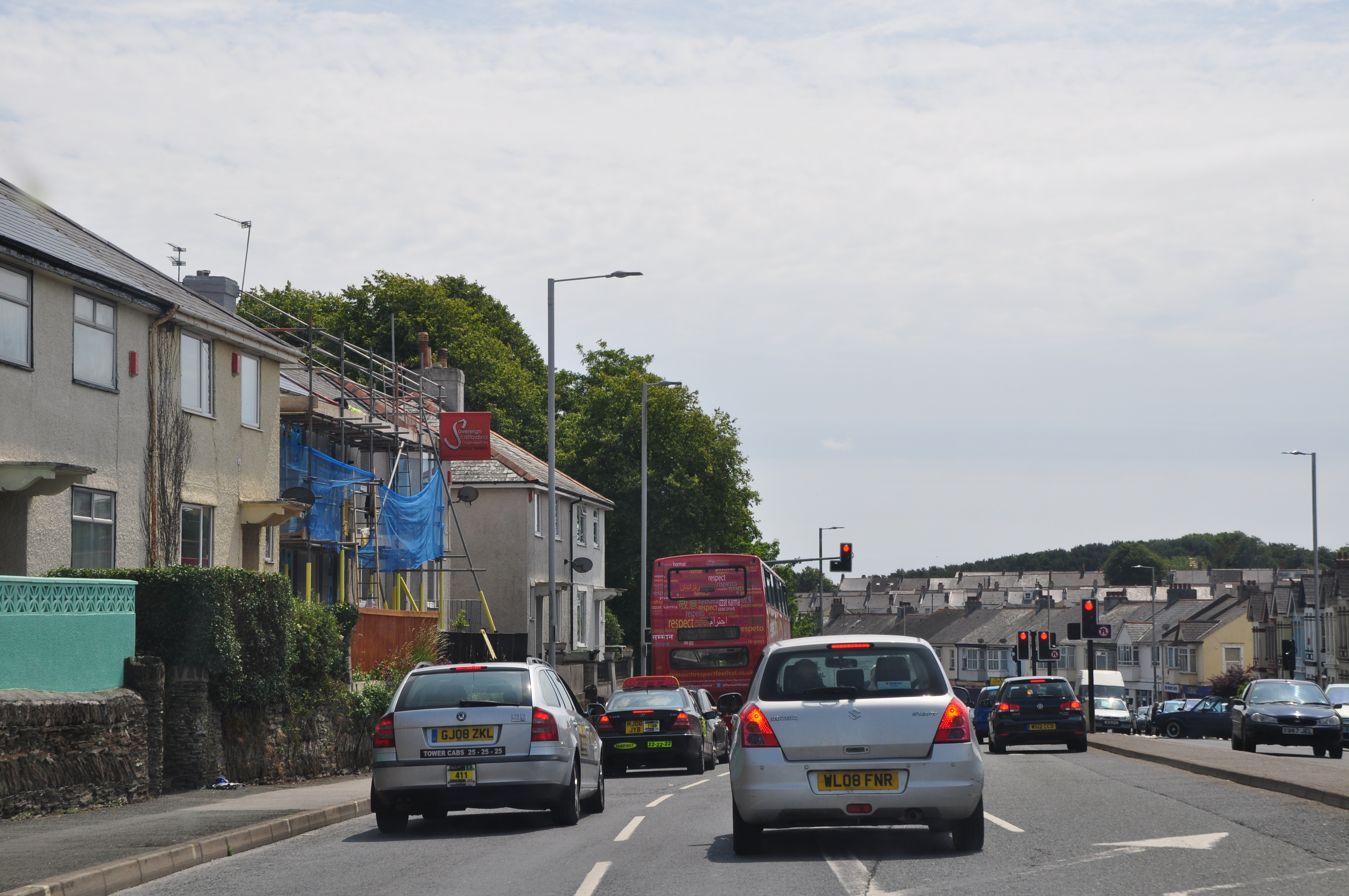
Wolseley Road running through North Prospect, 2015

North Prospect is an area in Plymouth.

== History ==
=== Construction and early history ===
Swilly House was the first council estate built in Plymouth during the 1920s, primarily to accommodate officers settling back in Britain following the devastation of the First World War. The Housing, Town Planning, &c. Act 1919 promised "Homes for Heroes" and an improvement on the overcrowded and inadequate living conditions that existed in early 20th century Britain and Swilly was Plymouth's response to this act.

Swilly House had been at the centre of a prosperous country estate. Much of the former mansion was transferred from Swilly, being reconstructed at a site known as Woodtown on the edge of Dartmoor. The original word may have derived from the Anglo-Saxon word meaning "farmland", but also it may have a Celtic derivation associated to water (refer to the Irish "Lough Swilly" and "River Swilly") as the earliest reference in Plymouth to "Swilly creek" in 1578 pre-dates the subsequent farm.

Before the Second World War much of the locality of what is now North Prospect and the western edge of Beacon Park was known as Swilly. Swilly Post Office was at the corner of South Down Road and West Down Road. Swilly Hospital (later renamed Scott Hospital after Robert Falcon Scott, who lived at the nearby Outland House and was later leader of ill-fated Antarctic Expedition in 1912) was first a sanatorium and later an isolation hospital and was situated at the heart of the estate (the junction of Swilly Road, renamed North Prospect Road, and Beacon Park). Not far from here (at 142 Swilly Road) the first bombs of the Blitz fell. For a time, Ron Goodwin, whose orchestral compositions include 633 Squadron, lived at Swilly Crescent which, having been later renamed North Prospect Crescent, is now known as Goodwin Crescent.

=== Post-war decline and disrepute ===
The council estate, designed with plenty of open space and trees, was prosperous up until the 1950s when the area began to get a reputation due to the economic and social problems of its residents. The officer class who originally lived in the area had begun to be superseded by poorer families from the most deprived areas of Plymouth, particularly Devonport, in the 1930s. Due to severe underinvestment by subsequent council administrations, Swilly, its housing stock and the community at large became increasingly vulnerable to criticism and even contempt.

At this point, the name "Swilly" became a derogatory term for any economically deprived residents of Plymouth, and efforts were made initially to apply the name Swilly only to the council estate and later to get rid of the name altogether.

=== Regeneration ===
In the 1970s, the name was changed to North Prospect and the area has since seen some urban regeneration. North Prospect consists in many residential streets connected with North Prospect Road where the local shops are located. Its name is still synonymous with economic depression and petty crime in Devon and Cornwall, though the widespread use of ASBOs and a new police station have gone some way to treat the minority who continue to foster the area's negative reputation.

=== Recent redevelopment ===
In March 2006, Plymouth City Council announced that it was considering replacing the oldest housing stock on the estate with new housing. An intensive building survey found a good proportion of the houses to suffer from untreatable damp and significant structural problems. A consensus continues to grow that it would be cheaper to replace, rather than simply patch-up, a great many houses on the estate. An investment of over £30 million is needed to improve the estate's housing stock and any large-scale re-development is likely to take many years and much public consultation.

In autumn 2010 Plymouth Community Homes (PCH) selected Barratt Homes as the development partner to redevelop the estate. Barratt Homes demolished the majority of the existing houses and redeveloped the area by building 574 new 'modern energy efficient' homes. In addition to new homes Barratts constructed a community hub named Beacon Community Hub which includes a shop, library (which is run by Plymouth City Council), North Prospect's Sure Start nursery, office space and flats. It also hosts North Prospect Community Choir which launched in November 2016. The hub was completed and opened in early 2014. The overall redevelopment scheme has provided local residents with affordable private homes which buyers were able to take advantage of the government's controversial Help to Buy scheme. A number of the new homes were also made available to Plymouth Community Homes tenants. The scheme is due to be completed in May 2017 and has been selected for numerous awards including the RICS 'Regeneration project of The Year (South West & Wales) Award 2013'.
