= Sutton Harbour =

Harbour and marina in Plymouth, Devon

Coordinates: 50.368°N 4.133°W

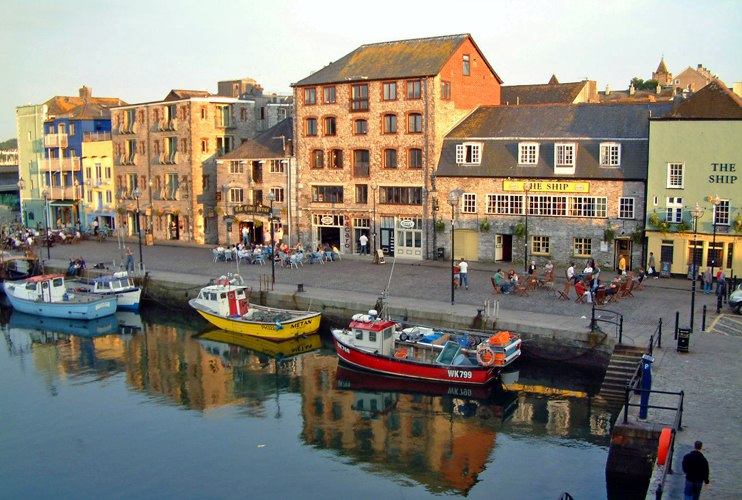
Fishing boats in Sutton Harbour at the Barbican.

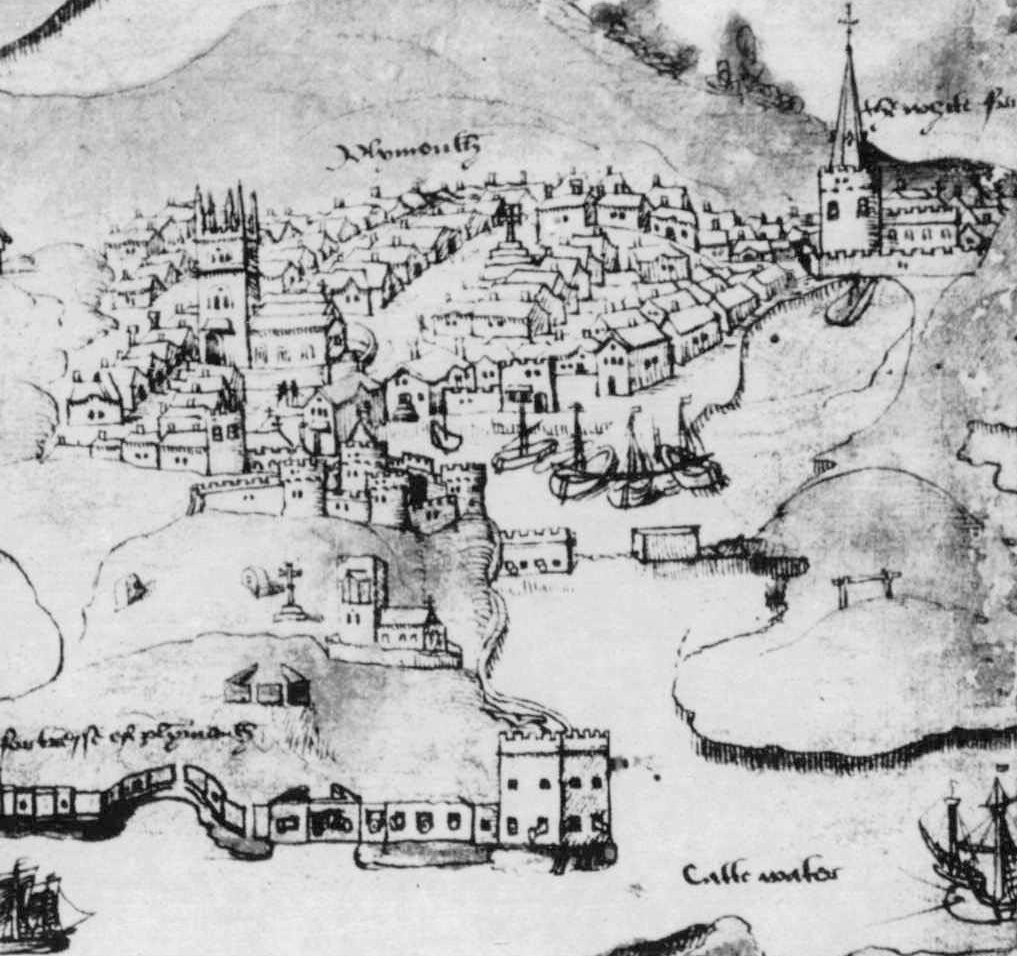
A depiction of the town and fortifications of Plymouth around Sutton Pool, from a chart dated 1540.

Sutton Harbour, formerly known as Sutton Pool, is the original port of Plymouth in Devon, England. It is still a busy fishing port and marina and is bounded on one side by the historic Barbican district. It is famous as the last departure point in England of the Mayflower, the ship that carried the Pilgrim Fathers to the New World.

== History ==
Sutton is the original name for Plymouth, which was originally settled in about 700 AD and is recorded in the Domesday Book as Sudtone, meaning "south settlement" in the Old English language. In 1588, the harbour was the base for the English fleet that sailed to challenge the Spanish Armada. Although the Royal Navy moved most of its operations to Devonport in the 18th century and larger commercial shipping moved to Millbay Docks, Sutton Harbour continued in use by the fishing fleet and coastal trading vessels. Lock gates were added to the harbour entrance in 1993.

== Landmarks ==
=== The Barbican ===
The Barbican is the historic district on the western and northern sides of Sutton Harbour and takes its name from a 15th century fortification which once guarded the harbour mouth. The Barbican claims to have the largest concentration of cobbled streets in England and has more than 100 listed buildings, many dating back to the 16th and 17th centuries.

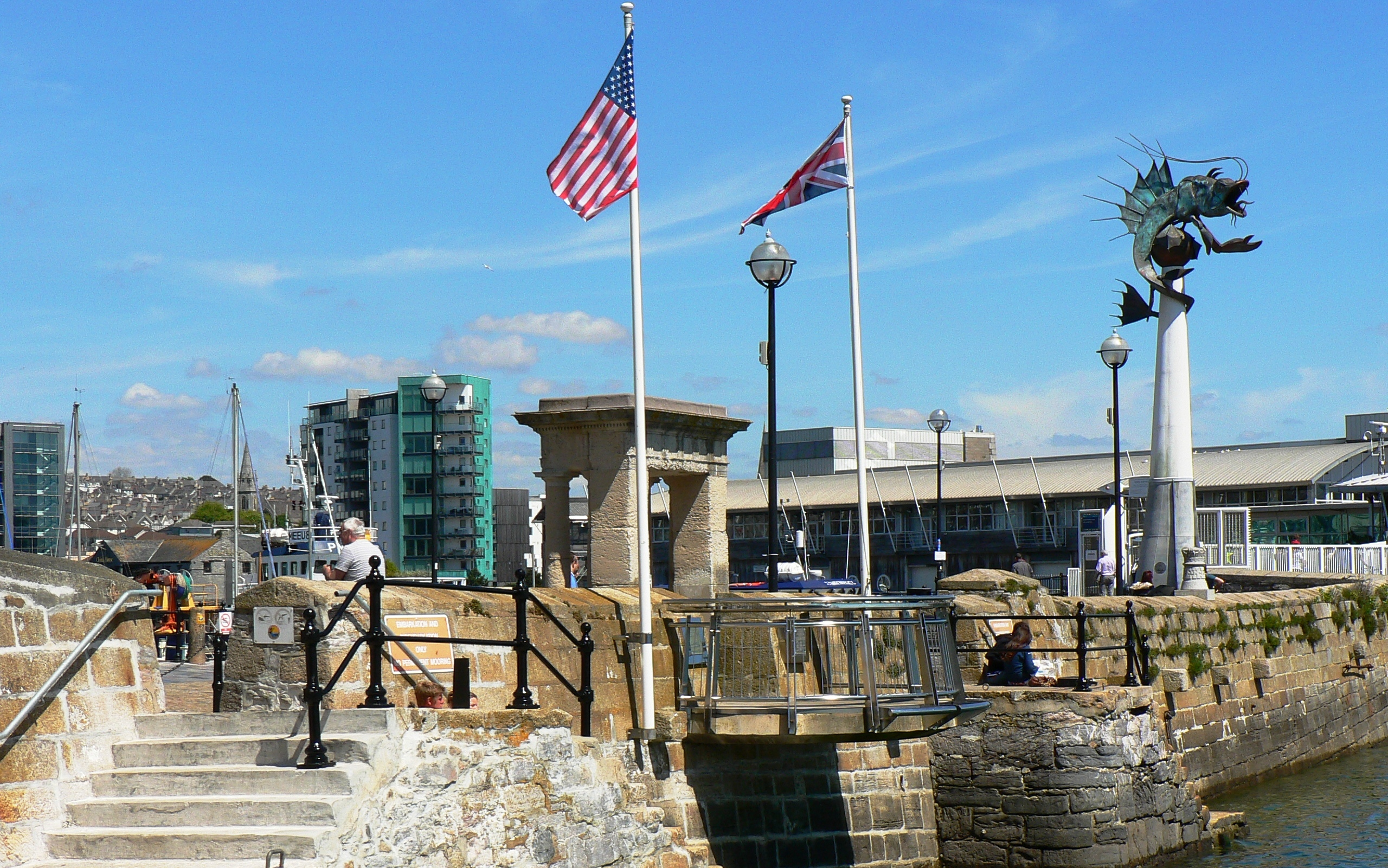
The West Pier of Sutton Harbour, showing the Mayflower Steps and The Leviathan sculpture.

=== The Leviathan ===
On the west pier of Sutton Harbour stands The Leviathan, a large sculpture of an imaginary sea creature, made up of the parts of various marine animals and birds. It is the work of Glossop based sculptor Brian Fell; it is made from mild steel coated with copper paint and is 33 feet (10 metres) tall. It is known locally as "The Prawn".

=== Plymouth Fisheries ===
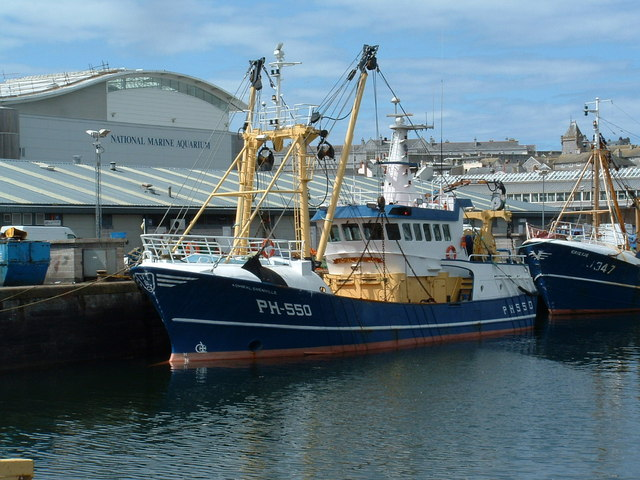
A trawler alongside the Plymouth Fisheries.

Originally, Plymouth's fish market was on the quayside at The Barbican; a purpose-built market building was opened there in 1892. In 1995, a new building was opened on the other side of Sutton Harbour. The turnover of the market has increased from £250,000 a year in 1995 to £19.4 million in 2015. The market now sells 6,000 tonnes of fish and shellfish annually, and is the second largest fish market in England. Around 40 fishing boats unload their catch at Sutton Harbour daily, but up to 70 per cent of fish sold in Plymouth arrives by road from other fishing ports in the South West of England.

=== The Marina ===
In 1972, the first 70 berths were opened for recreational yachts; today Sutton Harbour has 420. The Marina is managed by Sutton Harbour Holdings PLC.

=== National Marine Aquarium ===
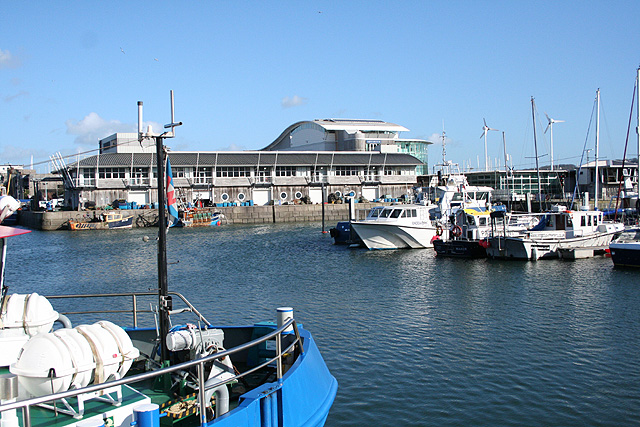
View of the National Marine Aquarium and Plymouth Fisheries across Sutton Harbour.

The National Marine Aquarium is the largest marine aquarium in the United Kingdom, with around 400 marine species, including a deep tank holding 2.5 million litres (550,000 Imperial gallons) of water. The aquarium opened in 1998, replacing one at the Plymouth Laboratory of the Marine Biological Association, adjacent to the Royal Citadel.
