= Island House, Barbican =

Grade II listed building in Plymouth

Island House
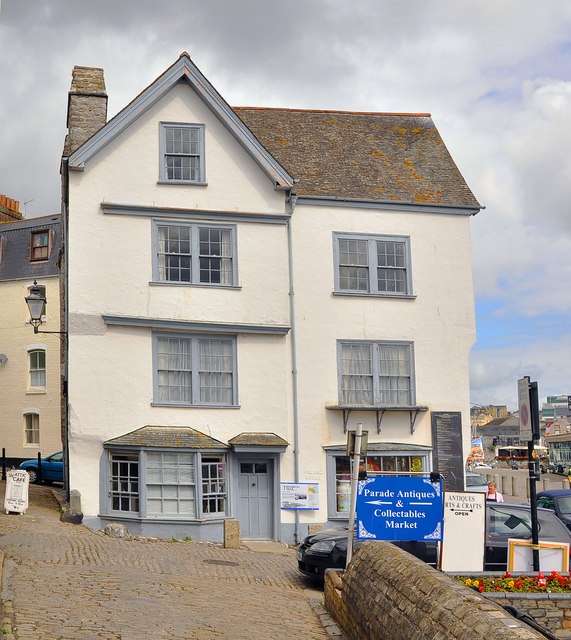
- View of Island House off Southside Street

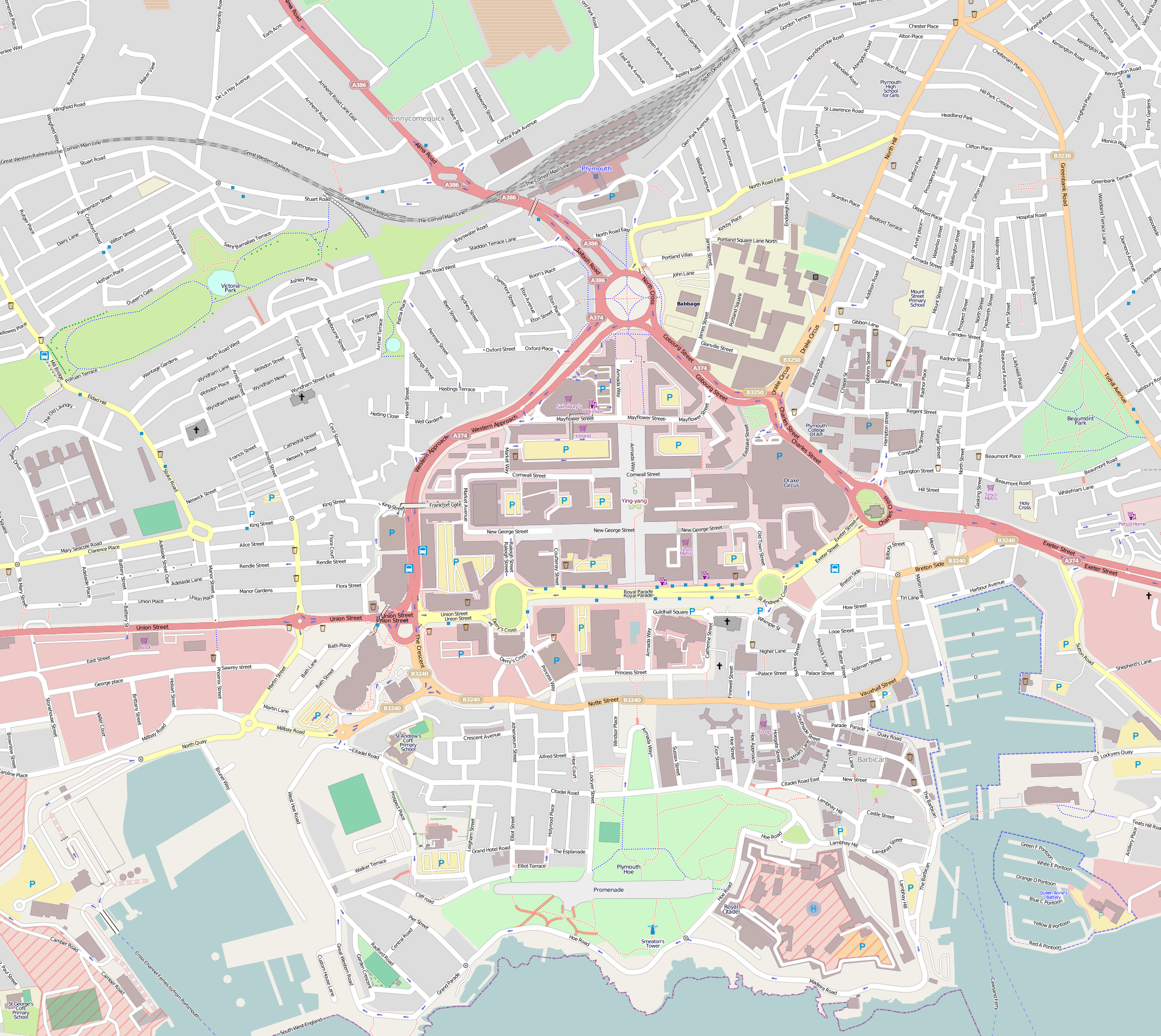
- Location within Plymouth, Devon

General information
- Status: Completed
- Location: Plymouth, United Kingdom
- Coordinates: 50.36696°N 4.13494°W
- Current tenants: Pilgrims Ice Cream
- Estimated completion: 1570s-1600s

Design and construction
- Designations

Listed Building – Grade II
- Official name: Island House
- Designated: 25 January 1954
- Reference no.: 1386438
- Known for: Final place of accommodation for the Pilgrim Fathers prior to their Mayflower voyage

Island House is a former merchant's house and Grade II listed building on the Barbican in Plymouth, Devon, England.

== History ==
Built between the 1570s and 1600s, it is known for being the last place of accommodation for the Pilgrim Fathers on English soil, prior to them setting sail on the Mayflower on 6 September 1620.

== Construction ==
It is a local example of a jettied merchant's house.

== Present day ==
Island House has maintained its Grade II listed status, until c. 2010 as a tourist information centre and since then an ice cream shop.

A blue plaque from 1976 can be found beside the shop entrance describing Island House as "one of the houses where a group of English puritans, since known as the Pilgrim Fathers, were entertained ashore prior to their final departure for America on the 6th September 1620 in the 'Mayflower'".

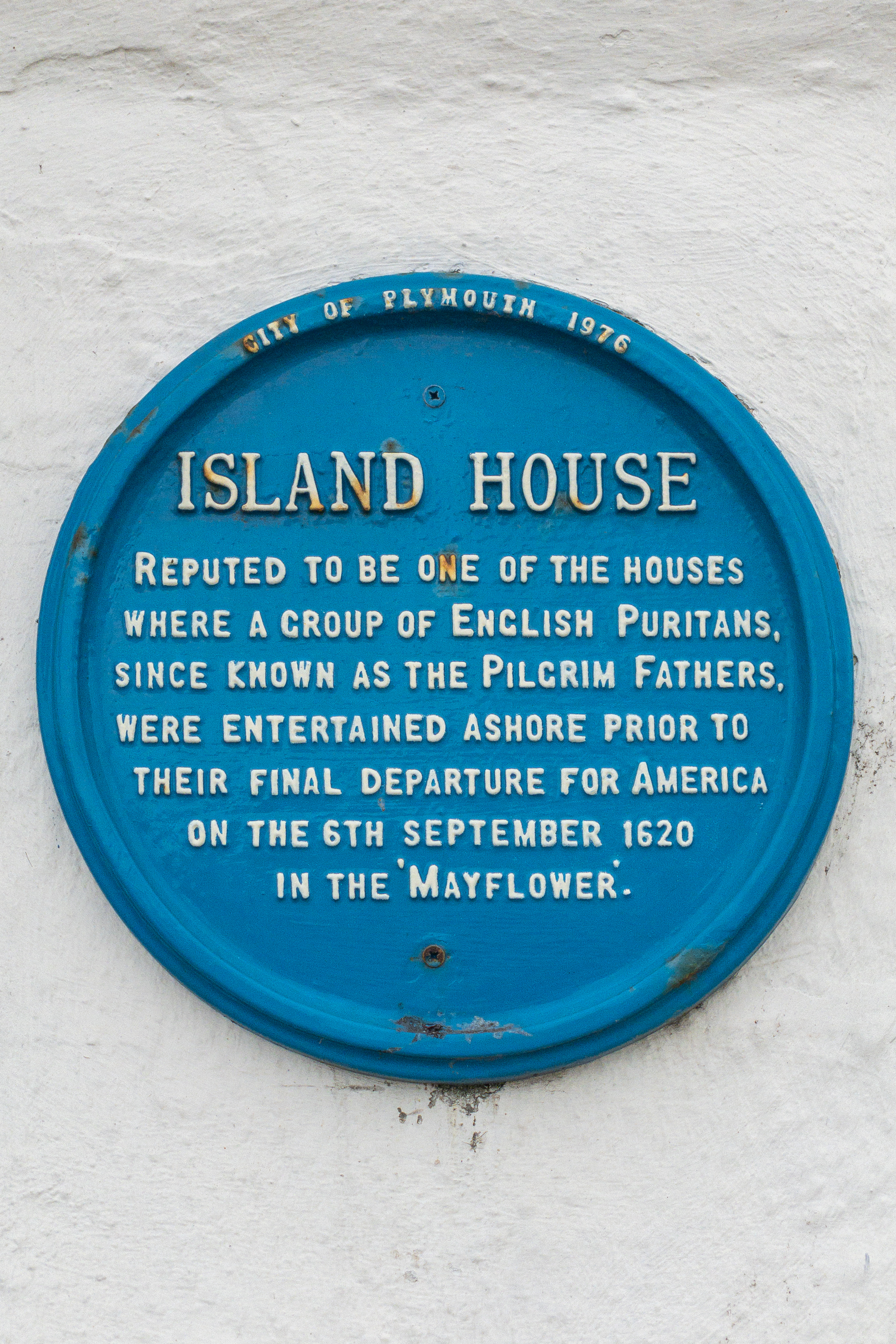
Blue plaque commemorating Island House
