= Dolphin Hotel, Plymouth =

Pub in Plymouth, UK

Coordinates: 50°22′1.67″N 4°8′5.48″W

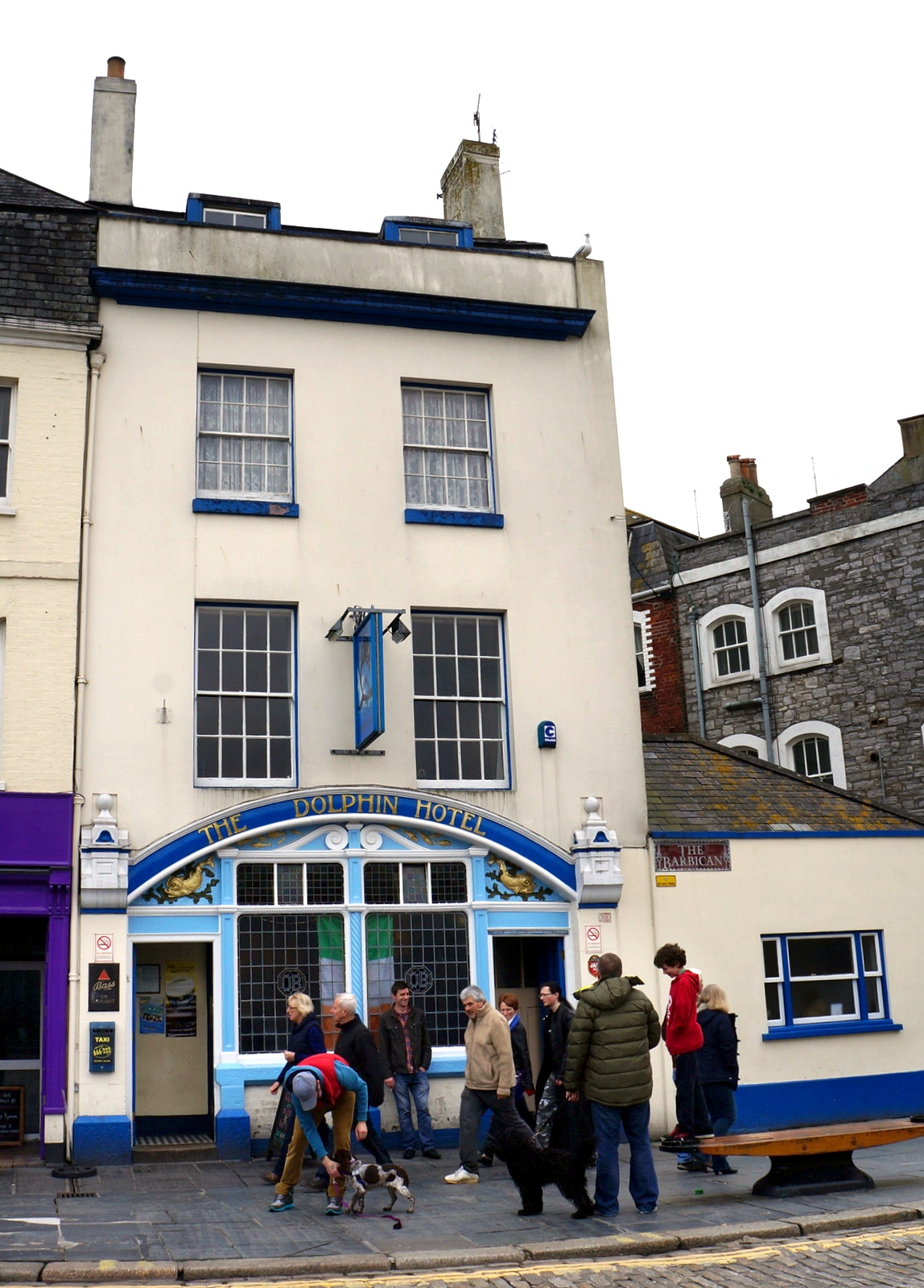
The Dolphin

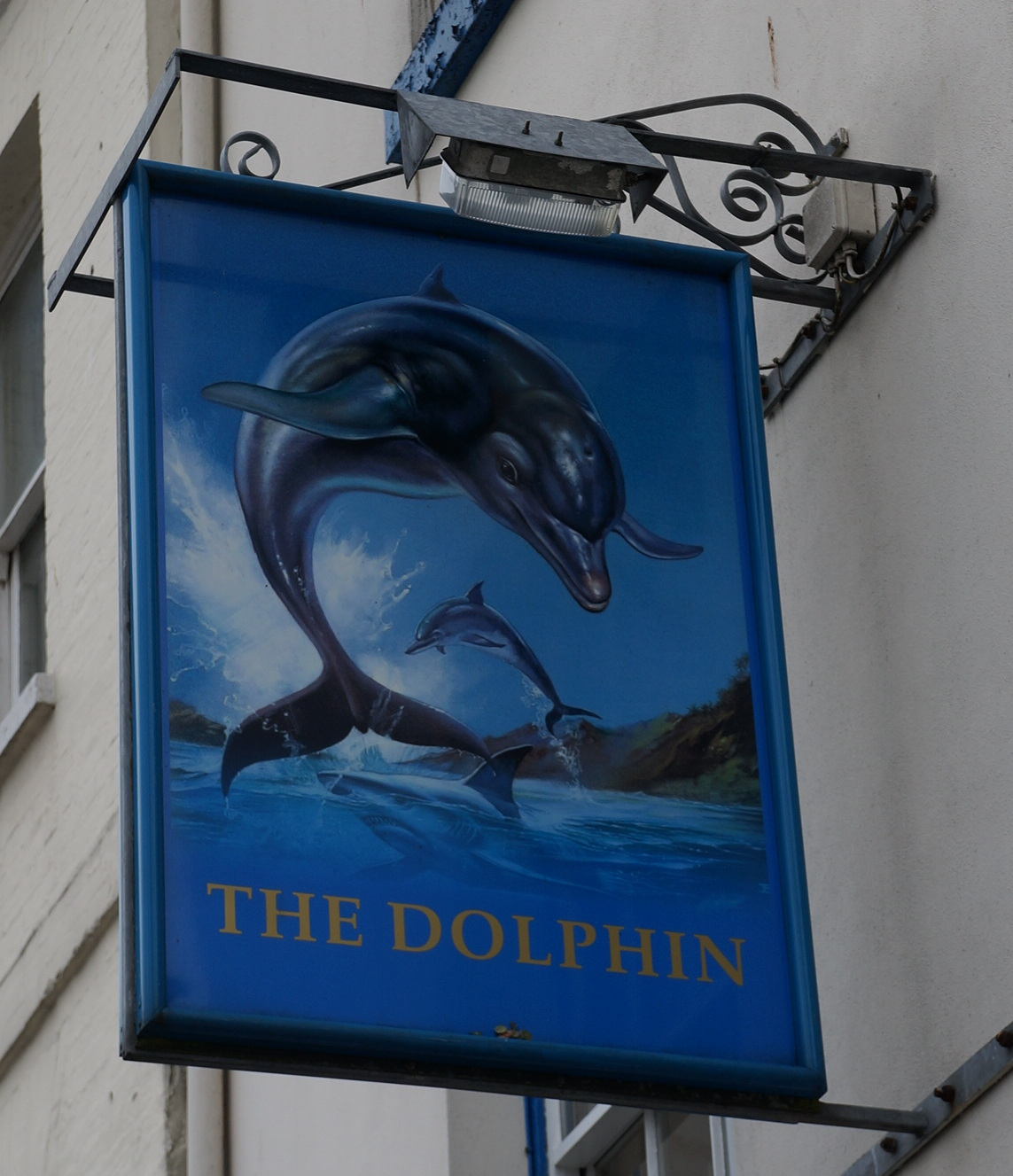
The pub sign is artwork from the 1992 videogame Ecco the Dolphin by fantasy artist Boris Vallejo

The Dolphin Hotel is a pub on the Barbican in Plymouth, Devon, England. The building, which is known as the Dolphin Hotel (never the Dolphin Inn) is a Grade II listed building. It notable as the setting of several of the artist Beryl Cook's paintings.

The three storey building was constructed in the early 19th century, although it may contain fabric from an earlier structure. It has a slate mansard roof surrounded by a tall parapet with a moulded cornice. The front has white stucco with plaster reliefs of dolphins. The pub is associated with the Tolpuddle Martyrs, some of whom stayed at the hotel on their return from exile in Australia in 1838, when a Mr Morgan was the landlord.

It is a no-frills unmodernised pub famous for its cask ale, draught Bass served straight from the barrel. It is listed in the Campaign for Real Ale (CAMRA)'s Good Beer Guide and the 2008 Good Pub Guide. The sign on the front of the building has always called the pub the 'Dolphin Hotel'. In 2010 the pub was refurbished, but vandalised in 2014.

The pub also provided the setting for the BBC's poorly received animated Janner comedy series Bosom Pals, which was based on some of the characters in Cook's paintings and featured the voices of Dawn French as the lead character Stella, Alison Steadman as her best friend Joan, and Timothy Spall as the Dolphin's real-life landlord Billy Holmes. Billy Holmes has been the landlord of the pub since the 1990s when he took it over from his parents.
