= The Barbican, Plymouth =

Maritime district in Plymouth, England

Coordinates: 50°22′2″N 4°8′10″W

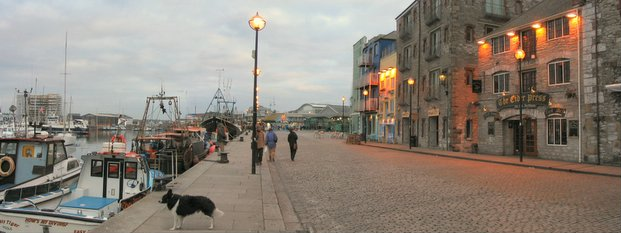
The Barbican waterfront at Quay Road in 2005, although currently this area is covered with enclosed seating and umbrellas.

The Barbican (Note: It is usually preceded with "the", with some linguistic exceptions.) is an area on the western and northern sides of Sutton Harbour, the original harbour of Plymouth in Devon, England. It was one of the few parts of the city to escape most of the destruction of The Blitz during the Second World War and the preceding era of slum clearance following the Public Health Act 1848 (11 & 12 Vict. c. 63). Two or three streets still retain some of the architecture of a historic fishing port. The Barbican has the largest concentration of cobbled streets in Britain and contains 100 listed buildings. The area is centred around the connecting roads Southside Street and The Barbican, with most businesses (mainly pubs and restaurants) located on or very near to these streets.

== History ==
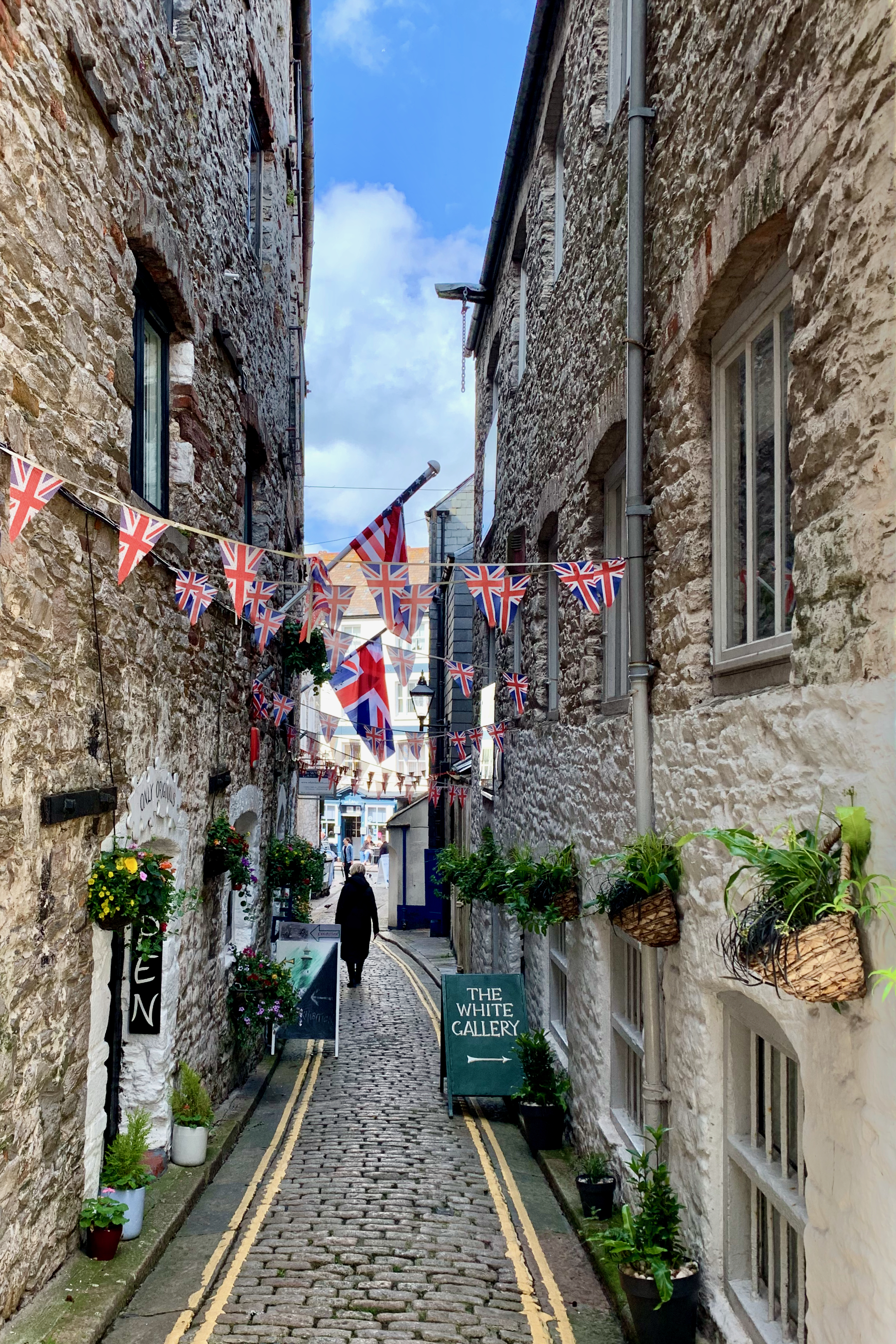
The cobbled New Street, which runs parallel to Southside Street, pictured in 2019

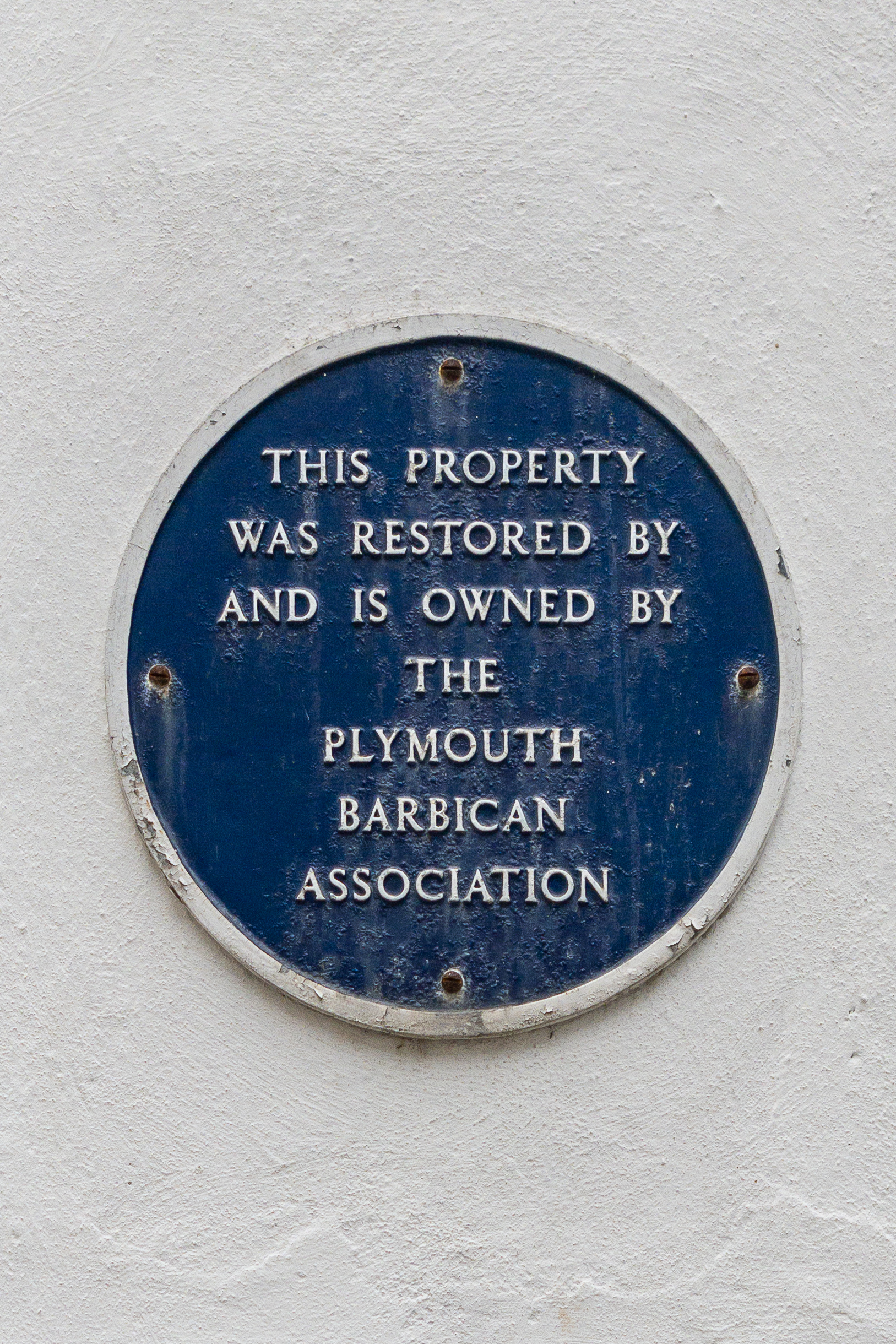
Plaque applied to buildings restored by the Plymouth Barbican Association

The present Barbican district is generally regarded as being roughly equivalent to the location and size of the medieval walled town of Sutton. A barbican is a fortified gate, and here the name probably derives from the 'Castle Barbican' which was an entrance to Plymouth Castle, the late medieval fortress that guarded access to the Cattewater, prior to the building of the Royal Citadel.

For centuries, the Barbican was home to Plymouth's fish market (now relocated to the other side of the harbour) and is still home to many fishermen. One of the oldest streets in Plymouth running north from the Barbican is New Street, which was formerly called Rag Street.

Much historical research and outreach work is done by the Old Plymouth Society and many of the oldest surviving buildings were restored and are still owned and maintained by the Plymouth Barbican Association.

However, many old and significant buildings were demolished during the late 19th and first half of the 20th centuries, which had decayed into unsanitary and heavily overcrowded slum tenements following the removal of wealthy merchant landowners to country estates and the subdivision of 'Golden Era' Elizabethan properties which had once been grand, reflecting the wealth and prosperity of the city at the time. A government survey following the Public Health Acts indicated that overcrowding in Plymouth Sutton was amongst the worst in western Europe comparable only with Warsaw, with families of up to 10 occupying a single room tenancy.

The Plymouth Gin Distillery has been producing Plymouth Gin since 1793, which was exported around the world by the Royal Navy. During the 1930s, it was the most widely distributed gin and has a protected designation of origin.

== Places of interest ==
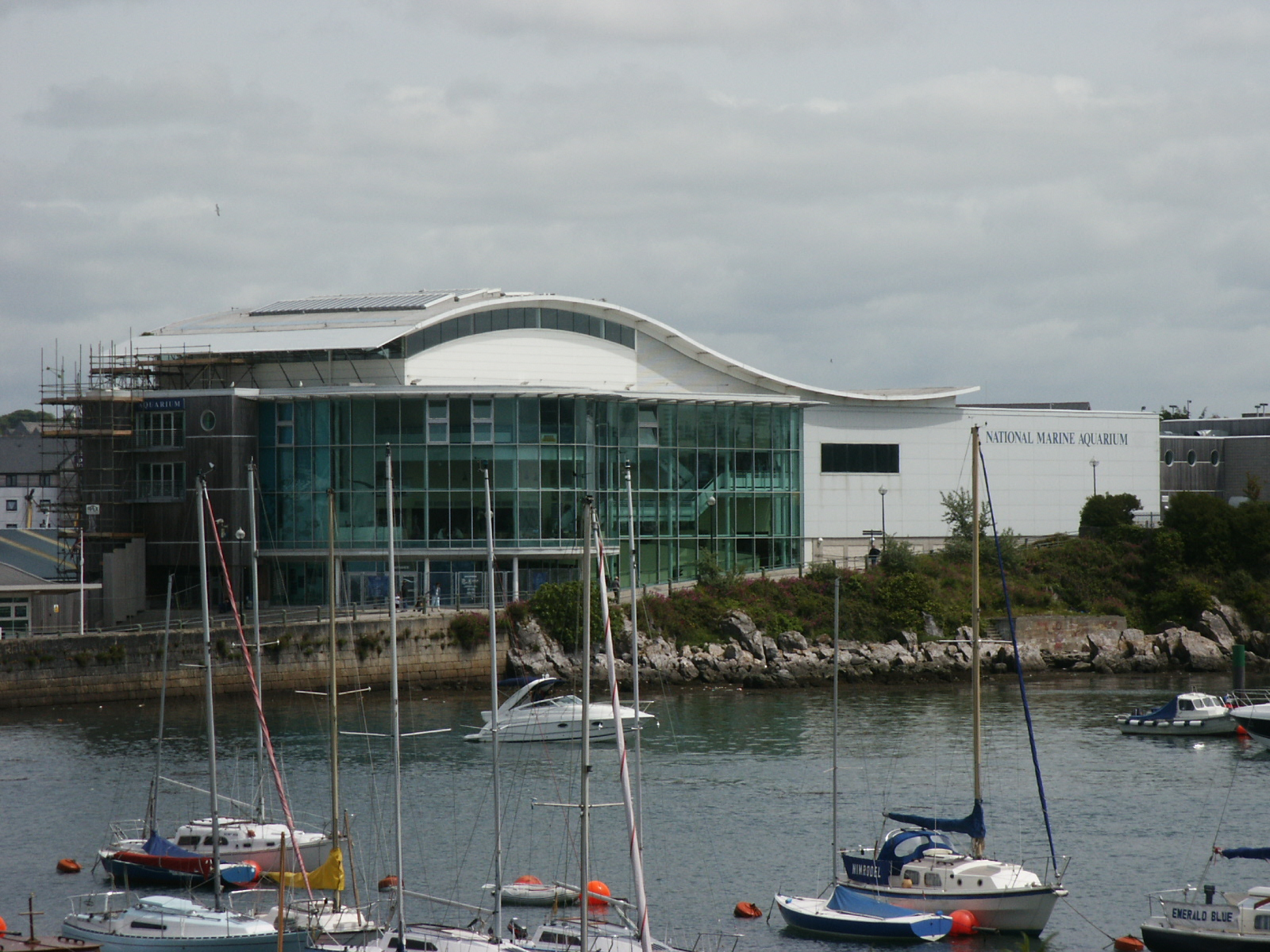
The National Marine Aquarium in 2005.

Places of interest include the National Marine Aquarium (technically in Coxside) which is one of the larger aquaria in Britain and has one of the deepest tanks in Europe; the Elizabethan House, an old house built in the early 16th century, now used as a museum; the Mayflower Steps near where the Pilgrims finally set off in the Mayflower for the New World in 1620, which is described in the nearby visitors' centre; and the studio gallery of the late painter and eccentric Robert Lenkiewicz, who lived and worked on the Barbican for many years deriving much of his inspiration and income from the local community.

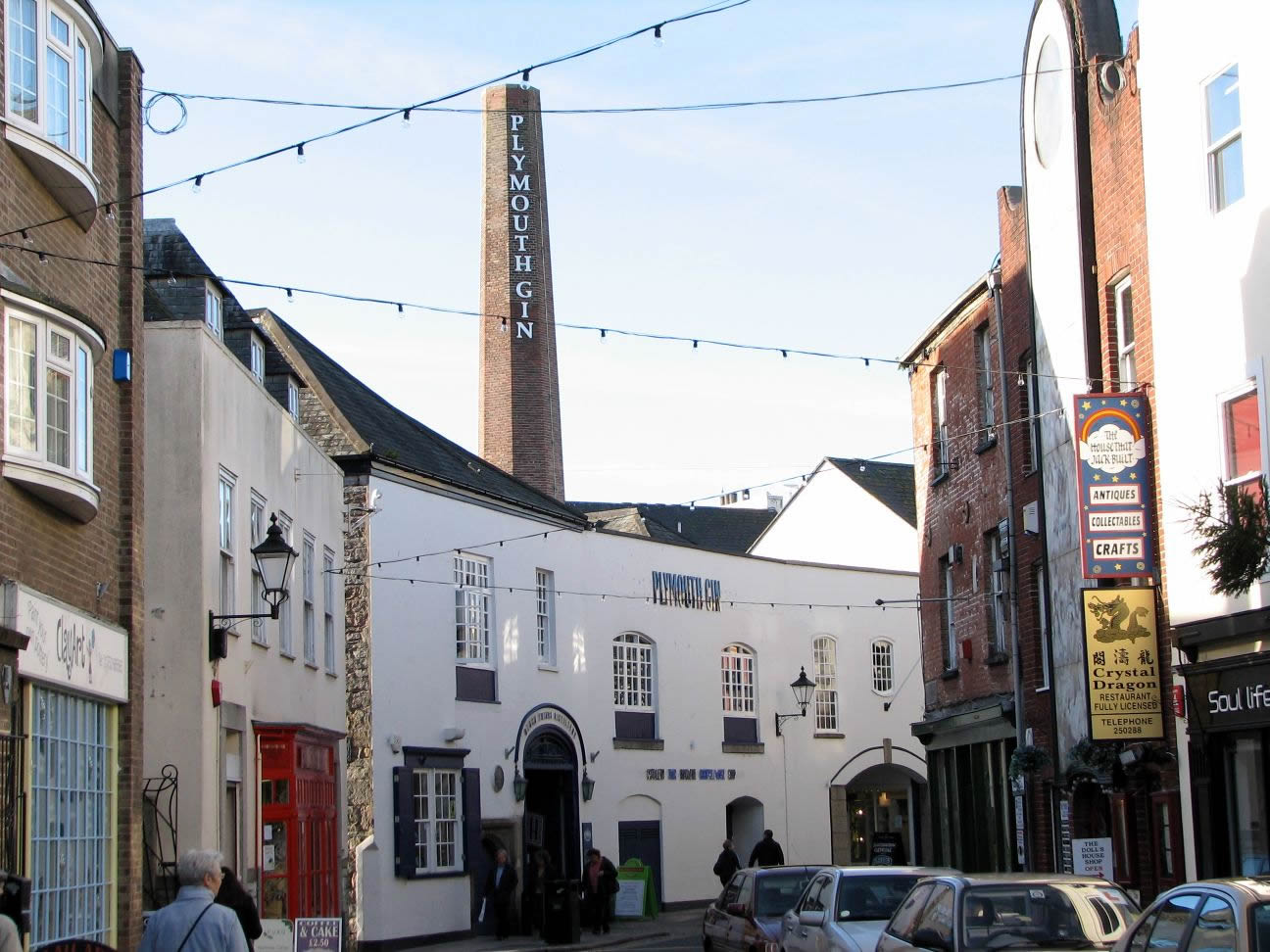
The Plymouth Gin Distillery on Southside Street, 2007.

The Barbican also contains a variety of shops and businesses including the Barbican Theatre, retail art galleries, the Plymouth Gin Distillery, the Dolphin Inn, Plymouth and numerous bars and eating places.

== Culture ==
The Barbican boasts some underground culture, from live music to Stone Soup Story Tellers evenings and festivals. The promenade of the Parade, shown above, paved with the traditional granite setts, is now filled by seating in glass-sided enclosures with large square umbrellas and infra-red heaters providing all-weather space.

== Developments ==
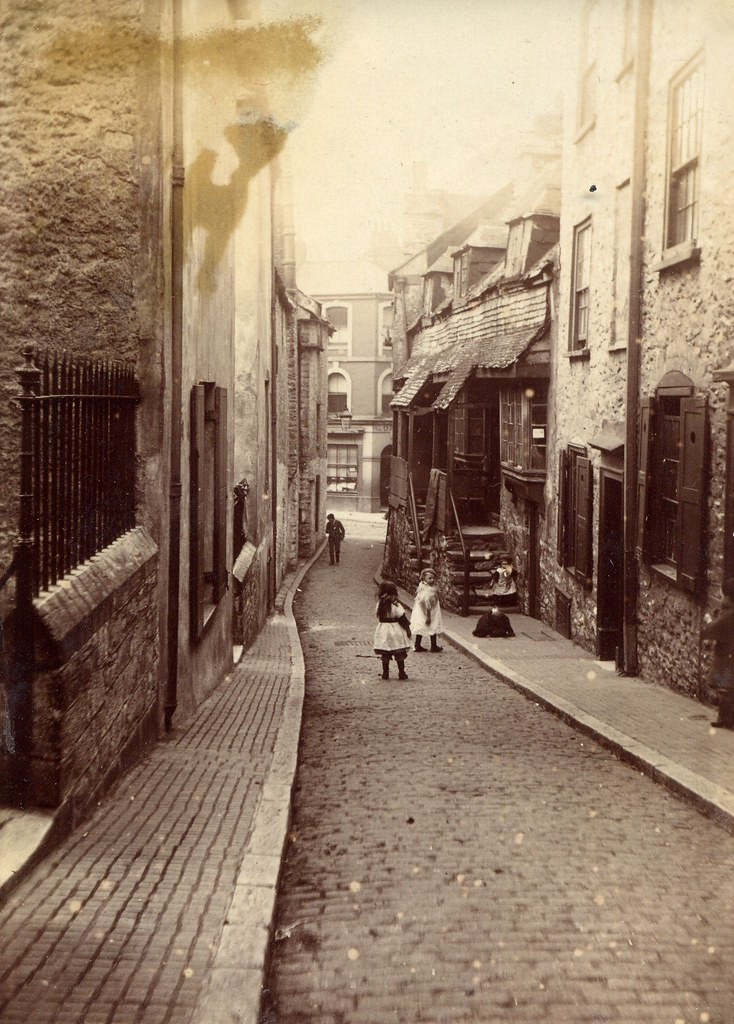
Photograph c. 1896, on Pin Lane, looking north towards Southside Street, the main road of the Barbican.

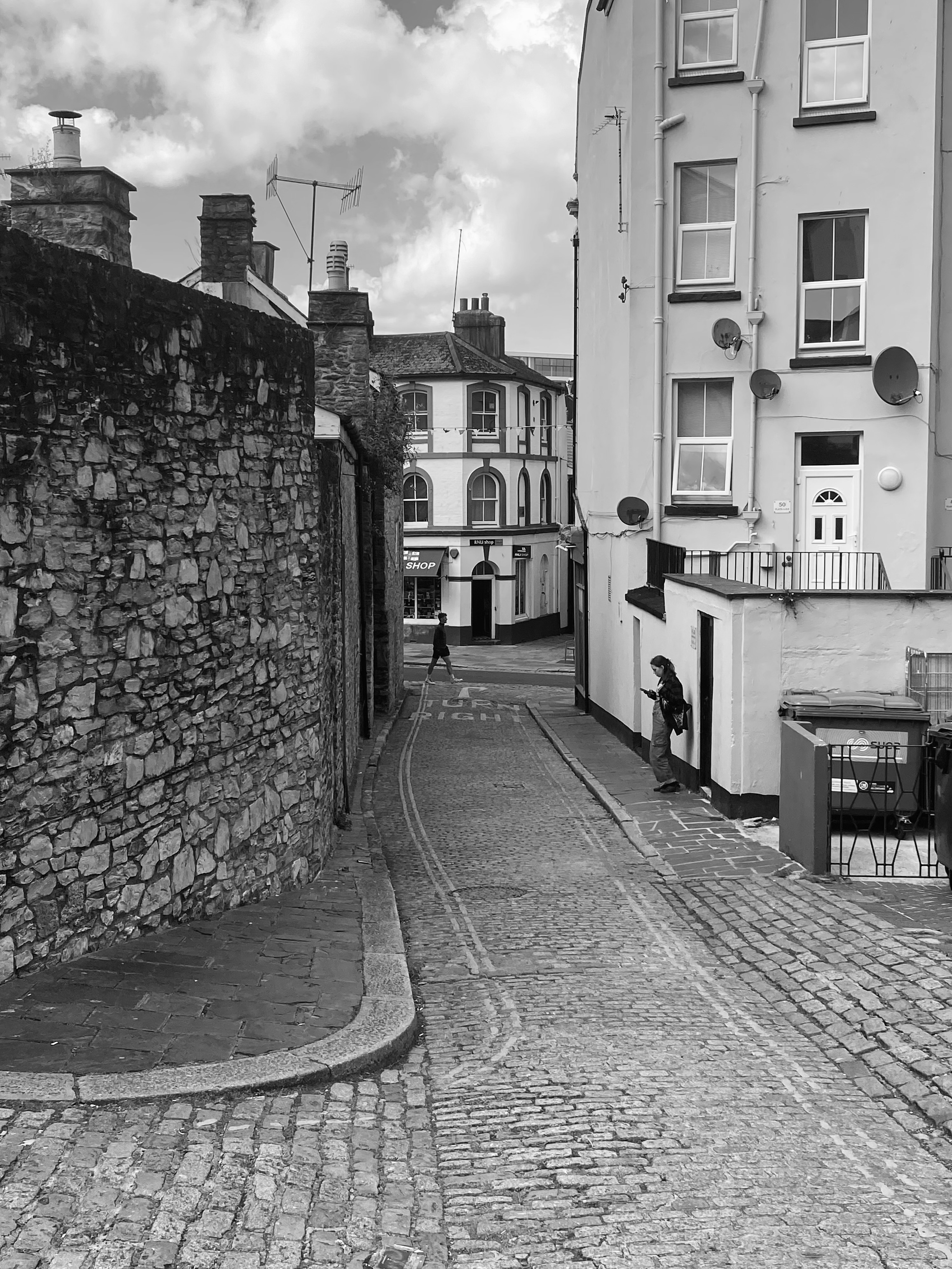
Pin Lane looking towards Southside Street, 2024.

The harbour was enclosed by a lock in 1993, designed both to provide a constant adequate depth of water for fishing and pleasure craft and to reduce the risk of flood damage being caused to low-lying property. In the same year, the Victorian fish market at the eastern end of Southside Street was closed and the modern fish market opened across Sutton Harbour at Coxside. This has been very successful and the auctions are some of the busiest on the south coast. There is much activity around the market quay as trawlers and small fishing boats arrive to offload their catches.

During the last two decades accelerating developments have taken place around most of Sutton Pool area. This has mostly involved the building of distinctive modern style waterside blocks of flats which have prevented the realisation of David Mackay's plan for a seafront 'gateway' from Sutton Pool into the city centre which would have required the clearing of many of the few remaining historical streets and the redevelopment of Bretonside Bus Station. There has also been adverse comment about the recent extension of the many marina pontoons severely limiting the area of open water.

== See also ==
- Grade II* listed buildings in Plymouth
