= Mayflower Steps =

Landmark

Coordinates: 50°21′57.82″N 4°8′2.40″W

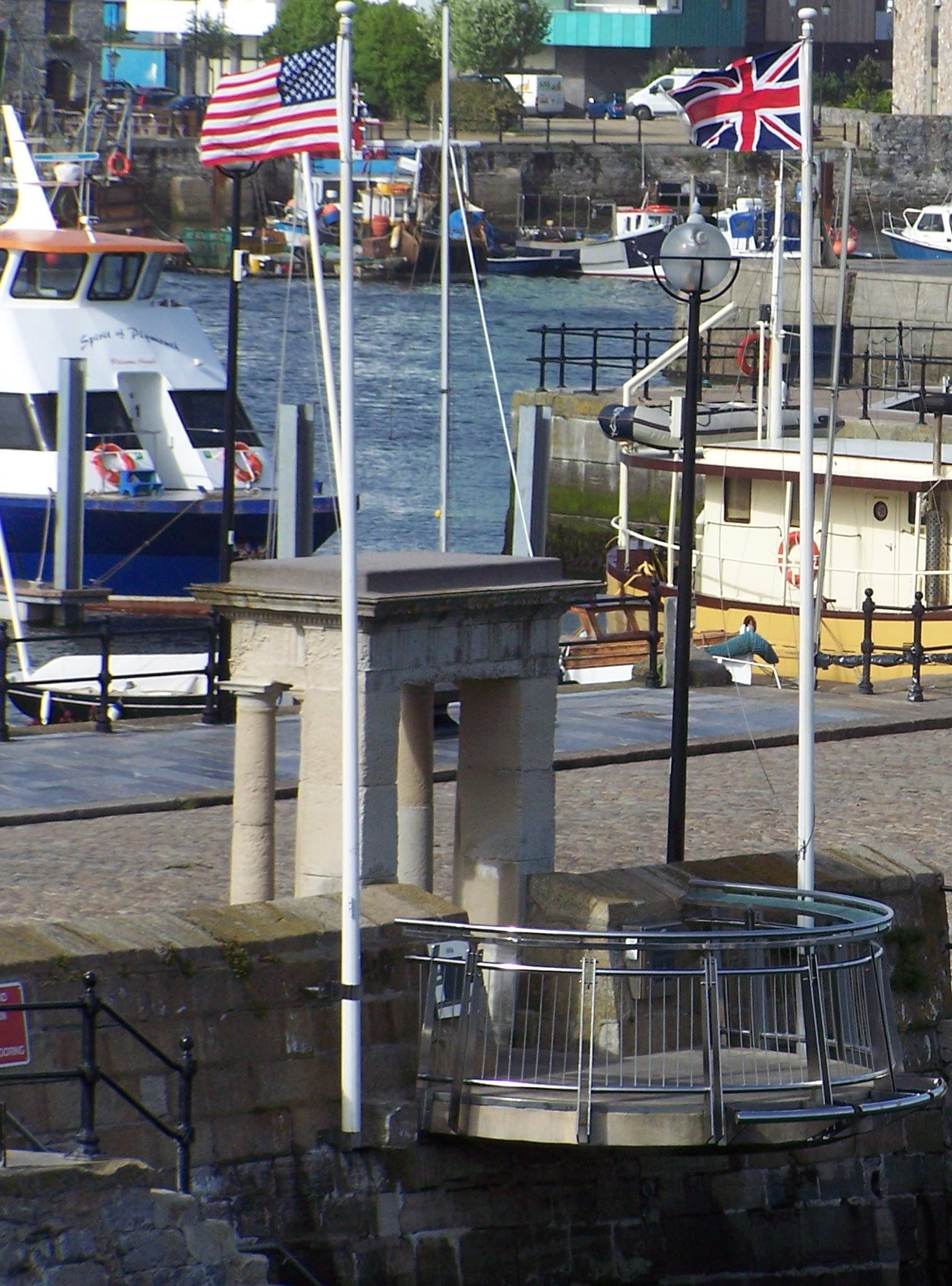
The Mayflower Steps are at the bottom left of this photo.

The Mayflower Steps are close to the site in the Barbican area of Plymouth, south-west England, from which the Pilgrim Fathers are believed to have finally left England aboard the Mayflower on 6 September 1620, before crossing the Atlantic Ocean to settle in North America. The traditional site of their disembarkation in North America is Plymouth Rock.

== Description ==
The steps today consist of a commemorative portico with Doric columns of Portland stone that was built in 1934, and a small platform over the water with a brushed steel rail and a shelf with nautical bronze artwork and historical information. It is on a small pier that is believed to have been built in the 18th or 19th century when some very old houses that were blocking construction of a road around the seaward side of the Royal Citadel leading to Plymouth Hoe were cleared together with the significant Watch House.

== History ==
The passengers who came predominantly from East Anglia had no links with Plymouth, but due to bad weather in the English Channel, they were forced to put in at Plymouth seeking shelter and essential repairs. Several surviving local buildings including what is now the Plymouth Gin Distillery in Southside Street and the Island House on the Quay are claimed to have accommodated some of them for one or more nights.

The best effort by local historians to place the actual site of the Mayflower finally casting off is roughly where a Victorian public house, the Admiral MacBride, now stands. Today, boat trips leave the Mayflower Steps for trips around the Plymouth Sound and up the River Tamar for sight of the 'Dockyard and Warships'.

== Bibliography ==
- Moseley, Brian (July 2009) [2003]. "Mayflower Memorial". The Encyclopaedia of Plymouth History. Plymouth Data. Archived from the original on 13 September 2010.
