= Plymouth Gin Distillery =

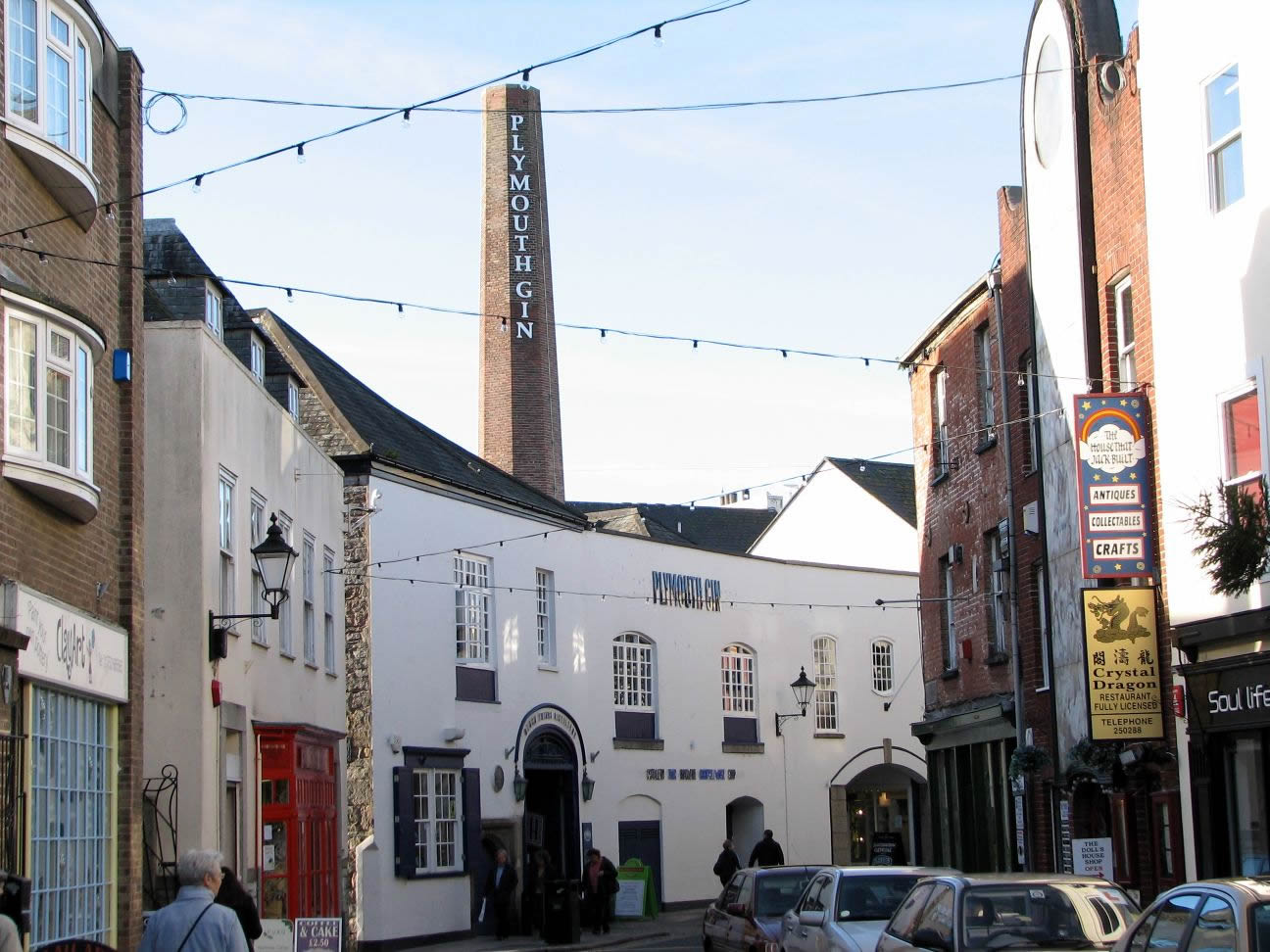
- The Plymouth Gin Distillery
- Interactive map of the Plymouth Gin Distillery area

General information
- Type: Gin Distillery
- Location: Black Friars Distillery; 60 Southside Street; Plymouth; PL1 2LQ, England
- Coordinates: 50.367619°N 4.137461°W
- Completed: 1793

Design and construction
- Designations: Grade II* listed

The Plymouth Gin Distillery, also known as the Black Friars Distillery, is a gin manufacturer on The Barbican, Plymouth, England. It is the only gin distillery in the city, and the only location certified to produce its protected style of Plymouth Gin. The original building opens on to what is now Southside Street. Established in 1793, it is the oldest operating distillery in Britain.

== History ==
Local tradition has it that it is located in what was once a monastery of the Dominican Order first built in 1431, earning it the "Black Friars" nickname, although there is no evidence to support this. It is also said that some of the Pilgrim Fathers may have stayed here while the Mayflower was in the harbour for repairs before finally setting sail to North America. This is where the ship on the company label is thought to have originated from.

It was a large merchant's house dating from around 1500. By 1605 the building was used as a gaol, and a Congregational meeting house from 1689 to 1705. It was remodelled and extended as a gin distillery from 1793 when Coates joined with the established business of Fox & Williamson. The business was known as Coates & Co. until March 2004.

== Present day ==
The building today contains a bar with bistro above, and the distillery provides several tours. Since 2005 the brand and premises have been owned by the Scandinavian V&S Group, better known for making Absolut Vodka, who in turn were later acquired by Pernod-Ricard.

Plymouth Gin is still made here, and in recent years there has been an increase in the popularity of the distinctive sweeter and lighter but stronger Plymouth flavour, compared to the more usual London Dry Gin. The company has produced a large range of promotional items, including Dartmouth Potteries Gurgle Jugs, miniatures, glasses, ashtrays, match strikers, etc. Many of these have become very collectable.

On the afternoon of 27 February 2008, the building was substantially damaged by a kitchen fire starting in the nearby (and that time recently opened) Barbican Kitchen, which has subsequently re-opened.
