= List of churches in Plymouth =

The following is a list of churches in Plymouth.

The city has an estimated 113 churches for 264,200 people, a ratio of one church to every 2,338 people.

Name	Neighbourhood	Web	Dedication	Founded	Denomination	Benefice	Notes
St Elijah Indian Orthodox Congregation, Plymouth	Plymouth		Elijah	2024	Indian Orthodox Church(Malankara)	St Elijah	Diocese of UK, Europe and Africa
Minster Church of St Andrew, Plymouth	Plymouth		Andrew	8th century	Church of England	St Andrew & St Paul	Awarded Minster status 2009. Conserv. evangelical
St Peter the Apostle, Plymouth	Plymouth		Peter	1846	Church of England	St Peter & The Holy Apostles MC	
St Jude, Plymouth	Plymouth		Jude	1875-1876	Church of England		
Cathedral of SS Mary & Boniface, Plymouth	Plymouth		Mary, Boniface	1807	Roman Catholic	Cathedral Parish	Bishops from 1851. Current cathedral built 1856-1858
Christ the King Chaplaincy, Plymouth	Plymouth		Jesus	1962	Roman Catholic	Cathedral Parish	Design by Giles Gilbert Scott
Catherine Street Baptist Church, Plymouth	Plymouth			c. 1620	Baptist		
Living Stones Baptist Church	Plymouth			2006	?		
Plymouth Methodist Central Hall	Plymouth				Methodist		
Plymouth Congress Hall Salvation Army	Plymouth				Salvation Army		
Plymouth Seventh-Day Adventist Church	Plymouth				7th-Day Adventist		
All Nations International Church	Plymouth			2000	All Nations Ministries		Meets at Catherine Street Baptist Church
Plymouth Vineyard Church	Plymouth				Vineyard		Meets in Plymouth High School for Girls
Plymouth Unitarian Church	Plymouth			1662	Unitarian		
SS Demetrios & Nikitas Greek Orth. Church	West Hoe		Demetrios, Nikitas		Greek Orthodox		
St Paul, Stonehouse	Stonehouse		Paul	1831-1833	Church of England	St Andrew & St Paul	Nearby St George's bombed in WW2, not rebuilt
Redeemer Church Plymouth	Stonehouse				?		Called Waterfront City Church until 2015
House of Prayer Ministries	Stonehouse				?		
St Michael & St Barnabas, Devonport	Devonport		Michael, Barnabas	1843	Church of England	St Michael & St Barnabas	Services at St Michael's. Rebuilt 1953, 2009. Cons. evang.
St Aubyn, Devonport	Devonport			1771	Church of England	Stoke Damerel & Devonport	Reopened 2011
St Bartholomew, Devonport	Devonport		Bartholomew		Church of England	St Bartholomew & St Mark	
St Joseph, Devonport	Devonport		Joseph		Roman Catholic	Cathedral Parish	
Devonport Community Baptist Church	Devonport			1998	Baptist		Plant from Mutley Baptist
Devonport Morice Town Salvation Army	Devonport				Salvation Army		
Rediscover Church Plymouth	Stoke			2011	Elim		Plant from Rediscover Ch. Exeter. Meets at St Barnabas
St Andrew with St Luke, Stoke Damerel	Stoke		Andrew, Luke	Medieval	Church of England	Stoke Damerel & Devonport	
Stoke Methodist Church	Stoke				Methodist	Plymouth & Devonport Circuit	
Engage Plymouth	Milehouse				Assemblies of God		
St Mark, Ford	Ford		Mark		Church of England	St Bartholomew & St Mark	New building 2011
Ford Baptist Church	Ford				Baptist		
Pilgrim Church Plymouth	Ford				URC		
Beit Ezra, Ford	Ford				Messianic Judaism		
Wolseley Road Gospel Hall, Ford	Ford				Gospel Hall		
Solomon's Porch	Ford				Partners in Harvest		Meets in Ford Baptist Church
St James the Less, Ham Drive	Ham		James the Less		Church of England	St Peter & The Holy Apostles MC	
Holy Family, Beacon Park	Ham		Holy Family		Roman Catholic	Holy Trinity Parish	
Morice Baptist Church	Ham				Baptist		
St Thomas the Apostle, North Keyham	Keyham		Thomas		Church of England	St Peter & The Holy Apostles MC	Current building 2004
Our Most Holy Redeemer, Keyham	Keyham		Jesus		Roman Catholic	Holy Trinity Parish	
St Pancras, Pennycross	Pennycross		Pancras		Church of England		Conservative evangelical
Pennycross United Methodist Church	Pennycross				Methodist	Plymouth & Devonport Circuit	
St Philip, Weston Mill	Weston Mill		Philip	1913	Church of England		Now meets in the church hall
St Boniface, St Budeaux	St Budeaux		Boniface	1913	Church of England		Current building 2003
St Budeaux, Higher St Budeaux	St Budeaux		Budoc	Medieval	Church of England		
St Paul, St Budeaux	St Budeaux		Paul		Roman Catholic	Holy Trinity Parish	
St Budeaux Baptist Church	St Budeaux				Baptist		
St Budeaux Methodist Church	St Budeaux				Methodist	Plymouth & Devonport Circuit	
St Francis of Assisi, Honicknowle	Honicknowle		Francis		Church of England	SS Aidan, Chad & Francis	
St Chad, Whitleigh	Whitleigh		Chad		Church of England	SS Aidan, Chad & Francis	Current building 2010
Exeter Hall Salvation Army, Whitleigh	Whitleigh				Salvation Army		
Bethany Evangelical Church	Whitleigh		Bethany		?		
St Aidan, Ernesettle	Ernesettle		Aidan	c. 1960	Church of England	SS Aidan, Chad & Francis	AEO from Bishop of Ebbsfleet
St Mary, Tamerton Foliot	Tamerton Foliot		Mary	Medieval	Church of England	Tamerton Foliot & Southway	
The Holy Spirit, Southway	Southway		Holy Spirit	1960	Church of England	Tamerton Foliot & Southway	
St Thomas More, Southway	Southway		Thomas More	1964	Roman Catholic	St Peter & St Thomas More	
New Life Fellowship, Plymouth	Southway				?		
St Anne, Glenholt	Derriford		Anne		Church of England	Bickleigh, Shaugh Prior, Woolwell	Other churches in the benefice are in Devon
Derriford United Reformed Church	Derriford			1966	URC		
SS Mary & George Coptic Orth. Church	Derriford				Coptic Orthodox		
Christ Church, Estover	Estover		Jesus	1980	CoE/RC/B/M/URC		
North Plymouth Community Church	Estover				?		
The Ascension, Crownhill	Crownhill		Ascension	1958	Church of England		
St Peter, Crownhill	Crownhill		Peter	1937	Roman Catholic	St Peter & St Thomas More	
Crownhill Methodist Church	Crownhill				Methodist	Plymouth & Devonport Circuit	
Calvary Chapel Plymouth	Crownhill				Calvary Chapel		
St Edward, Eggbuckland	Eggbuckland		St Edward (?)	Medieval	Church of England		
Trinity United Reformed Church, Plymouth	Hartley				URC		
Compton Methodist Church	Compton				Methodist	Plymouth & Devonport Circuit	
St Gabriel the Archangel, Plymouth	Peverell		Gabriel	1912	Church of England	Sacred Heart MC	
St Edward the Confessor, Peverell	Peverell		Edward the Confessor		Roman Catholic		
Hope Baptist Church, Plymouth	Peverell			1852	Baptist		Originally met in Fore Street, Devonport
Plymouth Chinese Christian Fellowship	Peverell				?		Meets in Hope Baptist Church
Cornerstone Fellowship	Peverell				Church of the Nations		
Emmanuel, Plymouth	Mannamead		Jesus	1870	Church of England	Emmanuel & St Paul	
Mutley Baptist Church	Mutley Plain				Baptist		
The Quaker House, Plymouth	Mutley Plain			1920s	Quakers		
St Matthias, Plymouth	North Hill		Matthias	1887	Church of England		HTB church plant 2016. Now combined with Charles Church (1665)
Sherwell United Church	North Hill				Methodist/URC	Plymouth & Devonport Circuit	
The Overcomers Christian Fellowship Int'l	North Hill				?		
Overcomers House, Plymouth	North Hill			2013	RCCG		
City Church, Plymouth	Greenbank				Freedom in Christ Ministries		
St John the Evangelist, Sutton on Plym	Sutton on Plym		John the Evangelist	1855	Church of England	Sacred Heart MC	
Plymouth Christian Centre	Sutton on Plym				Elim		
Salisbury Road Baptist Church	Lipson			1907	Baptist		
St Simon the Apostle, Mount Gould	Mount Gould		Simon	1907	Church of England	Sacred Heart MC	
Mount Gould Methodist Church	Mount Gould				Methodist	Plymouth & Devonport Circuit	
St Mary the Virgin, Laira	Laira		Mary	1911-1914	Church of England	Sacred Heart MC	
St Paul, Efford	Efford		Paul	C20th	Church of England	Emmanuel & St Paul	
Our Lady of Mt Carmel & St Teresa, Efford	Efford		Mary, Teresa		Roman Catholic		
Efford Christian Fellowship	Efford				Independent		
Blessed Virgin Mary, Plympton	Plympton		Mary	Medieval	Church of England	Plympton Team	Current building consecrated 1311
St Maurice, Plympton	Plympton		Maurice		Church of England	Plympton Team	
Our Lady of Lourdes, Plympton	Plympton		Mary		Roman Catholic		
Ridgeway Methodist Church	Plympton			1815	Methodist	Plymouth & Devonport Circuit	
Woodford Methodist Community Church	Plympton				Methodist	Plymouth & Devonport Circuit	
Colebrook Methodist Church	Plympton				Methodist	Plymouth & Devonport Circuit	
Underwood Chapel	Plympton						
St Peter's Lutheran Church, Plymouth	Plympton				ELCE		
Plympton Salvation Army	Plympton				Salvation Army		
Living Well Church	Plympton				Church of the Nations		
Chaddlewood United Church	Chaddlewood						
Chaddlewood Community Baptist Church	Chaddlewood				Baptist		
The Good Shepherd, Oreston	Oreston		Jesus	1886	Church of England	Plymstock & Hooe	
Oreston Methodist Church	Oreston				Methodist	Plymouth & Devonport Circuit	
St Mary & All Saints, Plymstock	Plymstock		Mary, All Saints	Medieval	Church of England	Plymstock & Hooe	
St Margaret Mary, Plymstock	Plymstock		Margaret Mary		Roman Catholic		
Plymstock United Church	Plymstock			1927	URC		Combined with Staddiscombe Gospel Fellowship 1991
Plymstock Chapel	Plymstock			1968	Partnership UK		
Pomphlett Methodist Church	Pomphlett				Methodist	Plymouth & Devonport Circuit	
St John the Evangelist, Hooe	Hooe		John the Evangelist	1855	Church of England	Plymstock & Hooe	
Hooe Baptist Church	Hooe				Baptist		
Holy Family, Staddiscombe	Staddiscombe		Holy Family		Church of England	Plymstock & Hooe	Meets in Staddy Function Centre
St Matthew, Elburton	Elburton		Matthew	1922	Church of England		Conservative evangelical
Elburton Methodist Church	Elburton				Methodist	Plymouth & Devonport Circuit	

== Demolished churches ==
Name	Neighbourhood	Web	Dedication	Founded	Denomination	Benefice	Notes
St Augustine's Church, Lipson	Lipson		Augustine of Hippo	1900	Church of England		Closed in 1993, demolished in 2001
St Mary's Church, Cattedown	Cattedown		Mary, Mary Magdalene	1912	Church of England		Closed in 1956, demolished in 2007–08
