= List of wards in Plymouth =

Wards in Plymouth, as of the May 2010 local election

The city and unitary authority of Plymouth, Devon, England has 20 electoral wards. Of which seven are Labour, nine are Conservative and the remaining four are mixed. Each ward has three member representatives except Drake, Plympton Chaddlewood and Plympton Erle, which have two. 31 members represent the Labour Party, 25 represent the Conservative Party and 1 being Independent making a combined total of 57 member representatives. The wards fall into one of three constituencies that make up Plymouth: Moor View, Sutton and Devonport and South West Devon. The constituency of South West Devon extends beyond Plymouth with wards in Ivybridge outside of Plymouth unitary authority's boundaries.

== Wards ==
Name	Labour	Conservative	Independent	Political party	Electorate	Constituency
Budshead	1	2	0	No overall	9,697	Moor View
Compton	0	3	0	Conservative	9,270	Sutton and Devonport
Devonport	3	0	0	Labour	9,880	Sutton and Devonport
Drake	2	0	0	Labour	6,362	Sutton and Devonport
Efford and Lipson	3	0	0	Labour	9,716	Sutton and Devonport
Eggbuckland	0	3	0	Conservative	10,050	Moor View
Ham	3	0	0	Labour	9,870	Moor View
Honicknowle	3	0	0	Labour	10,306	Moor View
Moor View	1	2	0	No overall	9,592	Moor View
Peverell	2	1	0	No overall	9,853	Sutton and Devonport
Plympton Chaddlewood	0	2	0	Conservative	6,156	South West Devon
Plympton Erle	0	2	0	Conservative	6,989	South West Devon
Plympton St Mary	0	3	0	Conservative	9,740	South West Devon
Plymstock Dunstone	0	3	0	Conservative	9,973	South West Devon
Plymstock Radford	0	3	0	Conservative	9,335	South West Devon
St Budeaux	3	0	0	Labour	9,673	Moor View
St Peter and the Waterfront	3	0	0	Labour	9,715	Sutton and Devonport
Southway	2	1	0	No overall	9,493	Moor View
Stoke	2	0	1	No overall	9,691	Sutton and Devonport
Sutton and Mount Gould	3	0	0	Labour	9,595	Sutton and Devonport
