= Weston Mill, Plymouth =

Coordinates: 50°23′53″N 4°10′41″W

Weston Mill is a district in the ward of Ham, which is part of the City of Plymouth, Devon, England. It consists of two parts Weston Mill Village which was first mentioned in the Domesday Book in 1155 and the other part which dates to the Victorian period, they are separated by Weston Mill Hill, which is the only street with this name. It shares its borders with Ham Woods Nature Reserve, King's Tamerton, St. Budeaux and Camels Head. The area derived its name from being the mill belonging to the tithing, Geoffrey de Weston. It is situated close to the major naval base Devonport Dockyard, and the majority of the housing in the area is privately owned. The A3064 'St. Budeaux Bypass' also runs through the area. Together with King's Tamerton the area's population in the 2001 census, was 4,647, of which 50.2 per cent were male and 49.8 per cent were female.

Between 1906 and 1921 Weston Mill Halt on the London and South Western Railway line to Plymouth Friary served the area.

== Education ==
Weston Mill Primary School (formerly Camel's Head Primary School), is the main state primary school in the area with the nearest secondary schools being Marine Academy Plymouth (in King's Tamerton) and All Saints Church of England Academy (in Honicknowle). There is no local independent provision.

== Local amenities ==
The nearest local shopping centre is 'the square' in St Budeaux, with a small collection of convenience stores in neighbouring Ham and North Prospect. There is also the local convenience store in Bridwell Road called "Weston Mel Stores". The Weston Mill Hotel, is the main public house in the vicinity.

Weston Mill Recycling Centre is one of the main recycling centres in Plymouth.

Weston Mill Cemetery, operated by Plymouth City Council, contains 400 war graves of Commonwealth service personnel of World War I (including one unidentified) who mainly lie in the naval and military war graves plot north-east of the cemetery chapel, and 556 from World War II (including 11 unidentified) of whom 111 were buried in the latter plot, 317 in a new plot for service graves, and the rest scattered throughout the cemetery. There are also 36 war graves of other nationalities, including 25 Polish service personnel, and special memorials to 2 World War I casualties buried in Stoke Damerel church cemetery whose graves could not be maintained.

Weston Mill Crematorium is one of two crematoria in Plymouth, the other being in Efford.

== Religion ==
The Parish Church of St. Philip was located on Bridwell Road but has now been demolished and replaced with a block of flats. The church hall still remains and has been modernised to include a lift from the road to the hall. The hall is now the principal place of worship on a Sunday in the area. It is attributed to the Anglican Diocese of Exeter.

== Places of interest ==
Ham Woods, and adjacent rural-like green areas nearby, is a popular spot for dog walkers.

Weston Mill Creek is a small body of water, now largely inaccessible, that has recently undergone works to improve sewage waste from being deposited there.
