= Freedom Fields Park =

Park in Greenbank, Plymouth, England

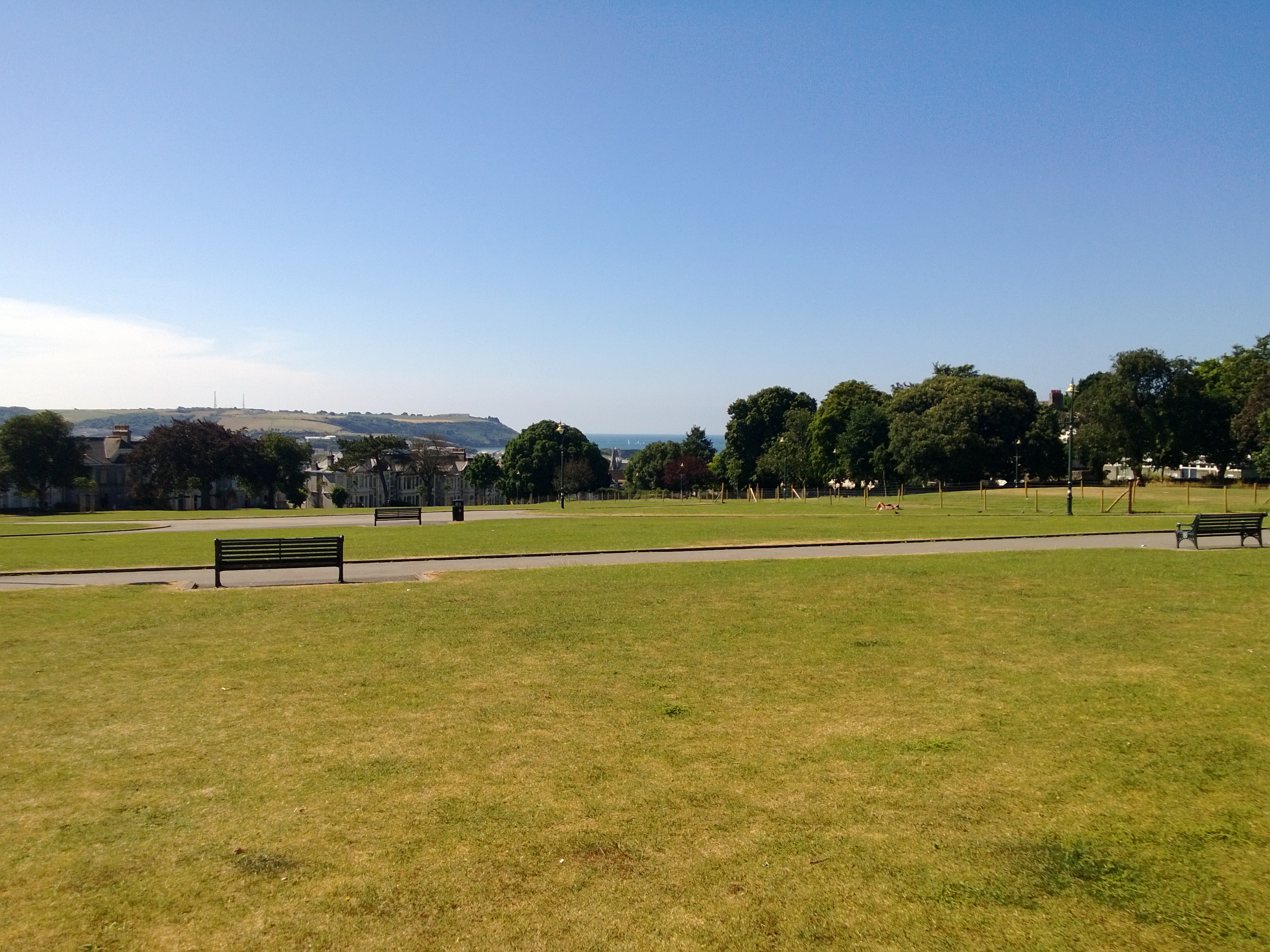
- Location: Plymouth
- Established: 1439
- Owner: Plymouth City Council
- Website: www.plymouth.gov.uk/freedom-fields-park

Freedom Fields Park is a park located near the Greenbank and Lipson areas of Plymouth, England. Restored in 2000, the park is one of the city's oldest.

== History ==
=== 1439: Establishment ===
The park was established in 1439 by an Act of Parliament for celebrations for the Incorporation of the Borough of Plymouth.

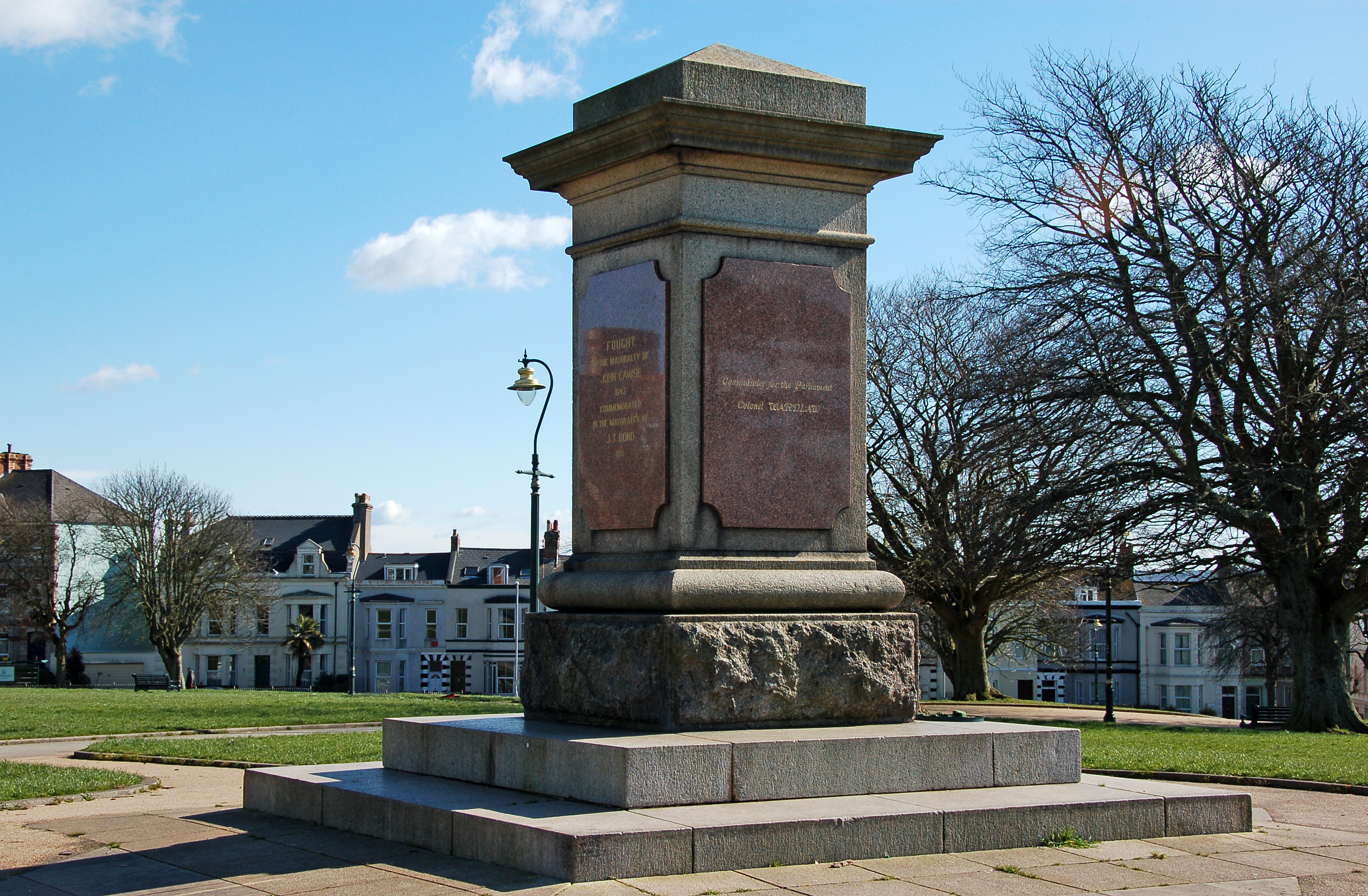
Freedom Fields monument

=== 1643: Civil War and Battle of Freedom Fields ===
On 3rd December 1643, during the English Civil War, an attack as part of the Siege of Plymouth began. The Royalists took advantage of low tide to capture an outpost at Laira Point. Reinforcements attempted to retake it, but were forced to retreat to what is now Freedom Fields Park, where they held their ground for several hours. This allowed time for additional Parliamentary troops to be assembled which outnumbered the Royalists army resulting in their retreat. This later became known as the Battle of Freedom Fields (also known as the Sabbath Day Fight).

=== 1800s – present ===
The location of the standoff is where the memorial now stands, which was constructed in 1891 after the park was extended in 1885.

The park was restored in 2000, and the park's cafe was renovated in 2018.

Freedom Fields Community Festival is a free yearly festival organised by the community that takes place in the park, the festival has been running since 2000 with the exception of 2020 and 2021 due to COVID-19.

== Awards ==
Year	Award	Result	Ref
2025	Green Flag Award	Won	
