= Mannamead =

Suburb of Plymouth, Devon

Coordinates: 50°23′N 4°08′W

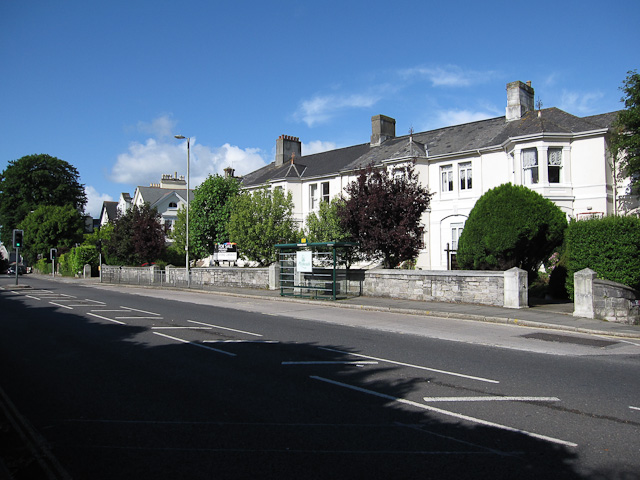
Mannamead Road

Mannamead is a leafy suburb in the Compton ward of the city of Plymouth in the county of Devon, England. It was an affluent Victorian and early Edwardian suburb with wide avenues such as Seymour Road, grand villas and Thorn Park. There are conservation areas but the area has been infilled and become more densely populated. There are very many care homes. The nearest secondary school is Plymouth College but the area has exceptionally frequent bus services passing many other schools.

There is solid late Victorian Anglican church named Emmanuel, which has a good set of well rung bells. The church is linked to others at Efford and Laira and a partnership with Compton Church of England Primary School.

A small row of shops lie on Henders Corner (the junction between Mannamead Road and Eggbuckland Road), as well as an NHS GP surgery, The Mannamead Surgery.

The suburb gives its name to a local branch of JD Wetherspoon pub, The Mannamead, which is situated on Mutley Plain. The Penguin Lounge, formerly The Tap and Barrel, is a locally owned pub situated on Ashford Crescent.

== Transport ==
Mannamead Road, which makes up the majority of the B2350, runs from Manadon Roundabout and Hartley to the North, down to Mutley Plain to the South. This the main traffic route for the area, and as a result hosts a frequent bus service Southbound towards the City Centre. Heading Northbound, there are Plymouth Citybus routes towards the suburbs of Crownhill, Eggbuckland, Efford, Southway, Tamerton Foliot, Whitleigh and Woolwell, as well as Derriford Hospital. Stagecoach South West services use Mannamead Road on the way to Tavistock, whilst a Target Travel route between the City Centre and Hartley Vale serves the backroads of Mannamead, such as Compton Avenue, Rockingham Road and Ashford Road.

The Lipson Vale Halt railway station was situated just off of Ashford Road, before it was demolished in 1942 due to being a fire hazard during The Blitz.

== Parks and sports ==
Mutley Park and Thorn Park sit very close to each other just off of Mannamead Road to the West of the suburb. To the East of Mannamead, Trefusis Park, or Tippy Park to locals, situated off of Old Laira Road, is seen as a dividing line between Mannamead to the West, Efford and Laira to the East, Compton to the North and Lipson to the South. Tulgey Woods separates Trefusis Park and Grantley Gardens.

There are two Plymouth City Council owned allotment gardens, one situated between Seymour Road and Elm Road, the other being situated between Overton Gardens and Compton Avenue.

There is a Tennis and Badminton club, as well as the Sir Francis Drake Bowling club, situated on Whiteford Road. The Mannamead Lawn-Tennis club, actually situated in Higher Compton, lies next to Collings Park, which is home to many local junior football teams, on Eggbuckland Road.
