= Drake Circus =

Drake Circus is a traffic junction in Plymouth, England. It may refer to:

- Drake Circus Shopping Centre, a shopping mall in Plymouth, England.
- Drake (ward), an electoral ward in Plymouth, England.
