= St Gabriel's Church, Peverell =

Church in Plymouth, England

St Gabriel's Church
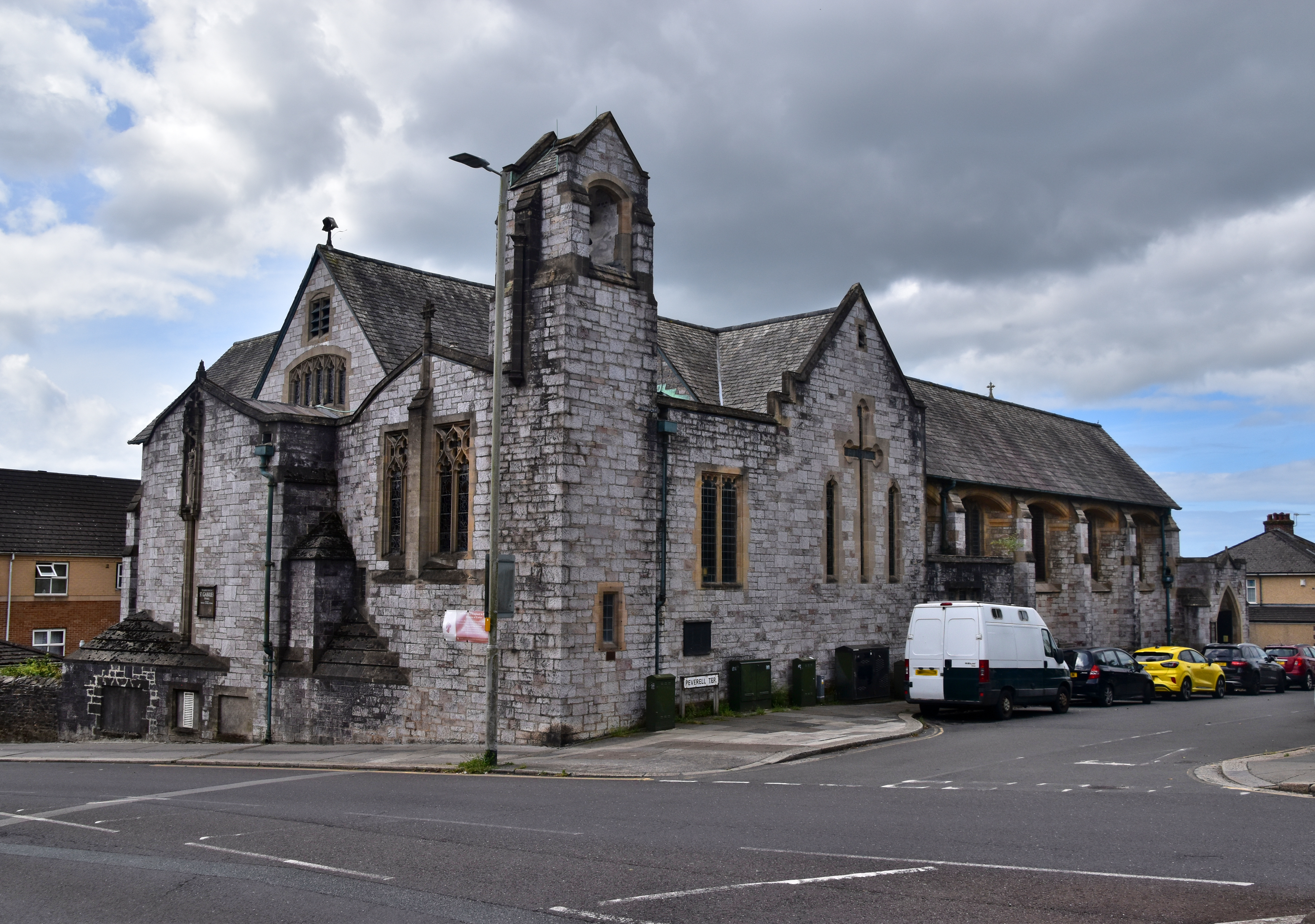

Religion
- Affiliation: Church of England
- Ecclesiastical or organizational status: Active
- Year consecrated: 1910

Location
- Location: Peverell, Plymouth, Devon, England
- Interactive map of St Gabriel's Church
- Coordinates: 50.3862°N 4.1388°W

Architecture
- Architect: W. D. Caröe
- Type: Church
- Style: Gothic
- Completed: 1924

Listed Building – Grade II
- Official name: Church of St Gabriel, Hyde Park Road
- Designated: 1 May 1975
- Reference no.: 1322003

St Gabriel's Church is a Church of England church in Peverell, Plymouth, Devon, England. Built to the designs of the London architect W. D. Caröe, the church was built between 1909 and 1910, with extensions in 1924 and 1955. The church has been a Grade II listed building since 1975.

== History ==
St Gabriel's Church was one of a number of churches to be built under the Three Towns Church Extension Scheme for Plymouth and Devonport, launched in 1897, on account of the large population increases in the area at the time. The new Peverell Park district was formed in 1907. Prior to the church's construction, a mission in connection with Emmanuel Church at Compton Gifford was started by Rev. N. N. Lewarne in the early 1890s. Sunday services were initially held in a house on the corner of Mutley Plain and Ford Park Road, and were transferred to the gymnasium of Plymouth College in 1893. In 1906, Rev. Dr. Trelawny-Ross of Ham and his son, Rev. W. Trelawny-Ross, gifted a site for the new church abutting Peverell Park Road. A Building Committee was formed that year and fundraising for the new church commenced.

The church was designed by the London architect W. D. Caröe. The foundation stone was laid by the Provincial Grand Master of the Devonshire Freemasons, Bro. G. C. Davie, on 22 May 1909. The initial construction phase cost £6,200 and saw four bays of the nave and north and south aisles erected, with a crypt below, and a temporary chancel and vestry. On 19 June 1909, services were transferred from the college gymnasium to the new crypt. It later served as the Sunday school and parish room. The church was consecrated by the Bishop of Exeter, Archibald Robertson, on 26 July 1910. The church was initially able to accommodate 500 people. Some of the fittings were gifted to the church, including the pulpit, lectern, font, prayer desks, and credence table.

St Gabriel's initially served as a chapel of ease in the parish of St Pancras, Pennycross. In 1910, part of the Pennycross parish and part of the Compton Gifford parish were incorporated to form the new parish of St Gabriel's on 13 October 1910.

Work was carried out between 1923 and 1924 on the unfinished end of the church, including the completion of the nave and north and south aisles, and the construction of the chancel, north transept and small sacristy. Due to limited funds, the proposed tower and side chapel underneath were omitted from the scheme and were intended to be carried out at some stage in the future. The extension increased the church's capacity from 500 people to about 800. As part of the work, the organ was moved from the ground floor into a loft. A stained glass window was also installed in the north transept as a memorial to the men of the parish who died in World War I. The Bishop of Exeter, Lord William Cecil, dedicated the new extension on 8 November 1924.

St Gabriel's was one of Plymouth's first emergency rest centres when air raids began in 1940, housing civilians whose homes had been damaged or destroyed. On 11 June 1955, the new lady chapel was opened. It was constructed between 1954 and 1955 using stone from St George's Church in East Stonehouse, which was destroyed by enemy action in 1941.

St Gabriel's became a Grade II listed building in 1975. Historic England consider it a "good example of Caröe's work", with the "articulation to the aisles being a particularly notable part of the exterior".

== Architecture ==
St Gabriel's is built of Plymouth limestone, with dressings of Doulting stone and slate roofs. It is made up of a nave, north and south aisles, north and south transepts, chancel, north east lady chapel with corner bell turret above. The main porch is on the north west side and there is another porch between the north transept. The altar rails are of 17th century date and originally came from St Bartholomew's in Lostwithiel. The five small figures above the chancel arch were made by Duncan Dearle of Morris & Co. in 1946. The two decorated panels of the reredos were gifted to the church in 1947 by Sir William Munday in memory of his late wife. They depict the Annunciation and are based on the painting of the same name by Filippo Lippi.

== Church hall ==
In 1918, a corrugated iron building was erected on the south side of the church as a church hall. It was gifted by Lord and Lady Mildmay of Flete House. The hall was demolished in 1997 after the site was sold to the Guinness Trust to make way for a new development of a block of 16 flats. A new church hall was converted from the crypt under the church and was opened in January 1997.
