= Brownston =

Hamlet in Devon, England

Coordinates: 50.35°N 03.84°W

- Location within Devon
- OS grid reference: SX6952
- District: South Hams
- Shire county: Devon
- Region: South West
- Country: England
- Sovereign state: United Kingdom
- Post town: IVYBRIDGE
- Postcode district: PL21
- Dialling code: 01548
- Police: Devon and Cornwall
- Fire: Devon and Somerset
- Ambulance: South Western

Brownston is a hamlet in Devon, England. It is located within Modbury parish.

Its church (dedicated to St John the Baptist) is now a private home and was built in 1844. There is also a converted Wesleyan chapel. Several of the farmhouses in Brownston are grade II listed. It also has a converted school and forge and was a busier place when the road through Brownston was a main route for people travelling from the South Hams area to Plymouth during the gold rush days. Brownston Cross was renamed California Cross at this time.
