= Drake's Place =

Park in Drake, Plymouth, England

- Interactive map of Drake's Place
- Location: University of Plymouth city centre campus, Plymouth, England
- Coordinates: 50.376284°N 4.137327°W
- Established: 1823
- Owner: Plymouth City Council
- Operator: University of Plymouth
- Open: During daylight hours
- Website: www.plymouth.ac.uk/facilities/drakes-place

Drake's Place is a victorian garden and reservoir located in the University of Plymouth's city centre campus owned by Plymouth City Council. Originally constructed in 1825, the reservoir became disused and abandoned by 1970, and the University of Plymouth took over management of the park in 2005.

The park is split into an upper and lower level, containing the reservoirs and gardens respectively. Parts of the garden walls and reservoir are Grade II listed.

== History ==
=== 1592 – 1823: Drake's Leat ===
In 1592, Plymouth built a 28 kilometres (17 mi) channel that passed through Drake's Place and carried water to the city from Dartmoor. The leat supplied water to the town, and the original conduits can still be seen today in the walls of the reservoir.

The leat also powered flour mills which were owned by Drake and were located on the site of the modern-day park.

=== 1823 – 1900: Construction ===
Drake's Place in 1905

The south reservoir was originally built in 1825 on the site of one of Drake's now demolished mills and further extended to include the north reservoir in 1828, at the time the reservoir was the main source of water for Plymouth.

In 1874, a new external wall was constructed around the site that included the Drinking Fountain. The site was expanded again with the addition of gardens in 1891 and a 200 feet (61 m) colonnade with a terrace on top was added so that people could relax by the water. The tower and cascade were also added during this time.

=== 1900s: Decline and Disrepair ===
The reservoir and gardens gradually became derelict over time, especially after the reservoir was taken out of use in 1970. The reservoir's fountains stopped working around 1980, but were later restored in 2014.

In 2006, Mark Ball was found dead in the reservoir at the park, a man was arrested and charged with his murder.

=== 2007 – present: Restoration ===
The University of Plymouth took over the lease to the reservoir from Plymouth City Council in 2007. In August 2010, a grant of £500,000 was awarded by the National Lottery towards the preservation of the landmark. The Big Lottery Fund also contributed to the restoration.

The restoration began in 2013 and the park opened in 2014 after being closed for over 30 years. The Tower was restored by Le Page Architects, and the gardens by Cornwall Environmental Consultants.

== Features ==
The Reservoir Walls, Colonnade, Boundary Walls and Railings, Conduits, Drinking Fountain and Fountain are Grade II listed. The University of Plymouth operates the Reservoir Cafe located on the upper level of the park. The park has received the Green Flag Award every year since 2015.

=== The Colonnade and Tower ===
The Colonnade is a 200 feet (61 m) terraced walkway and covered patio that separates the upper and lower sections of the park. The columns holding up the Colonnade were originally located in The Shambles which were butcher's stalls located outside St Andrew's church, and from 1791 were re-used in the market before being relocated to Drake's Place.

The Tower is located on the campus-side end of the Colonnade and was used as a toilet and wash-house for the staff who worked at the reservoir and gardens.

=== Gardens ===
The Gardens previously includes a water feature called the Cascade which would transfer water from the reservoir onwards to continue its journey down Drake's Leat. Whilst the exact location of the leat's onward journey is largely unknown, a portion was located underneath Armada Way during restoration works to the road in 2025.

=== Reservoirs ===
The reservoirs were fed from Drake's Leat and the Hartley Reservoir located in the city's Hartley suburb.

The reservoirs are home to Common Carp that were originally introduced to the water as part of a caged experiment but escaped and now swim freely throughout the reservoir.

== Awards ==
| Year | Award | Result | Ref |
|---|---|---|---|
| 2014 | Abercrombie Awards Best Public Space | Won | |
| 2014 | People of Plymouth Award | Won | |
| 2015 – 2024 | Green Flag Award | Won | |

== Gallery ==
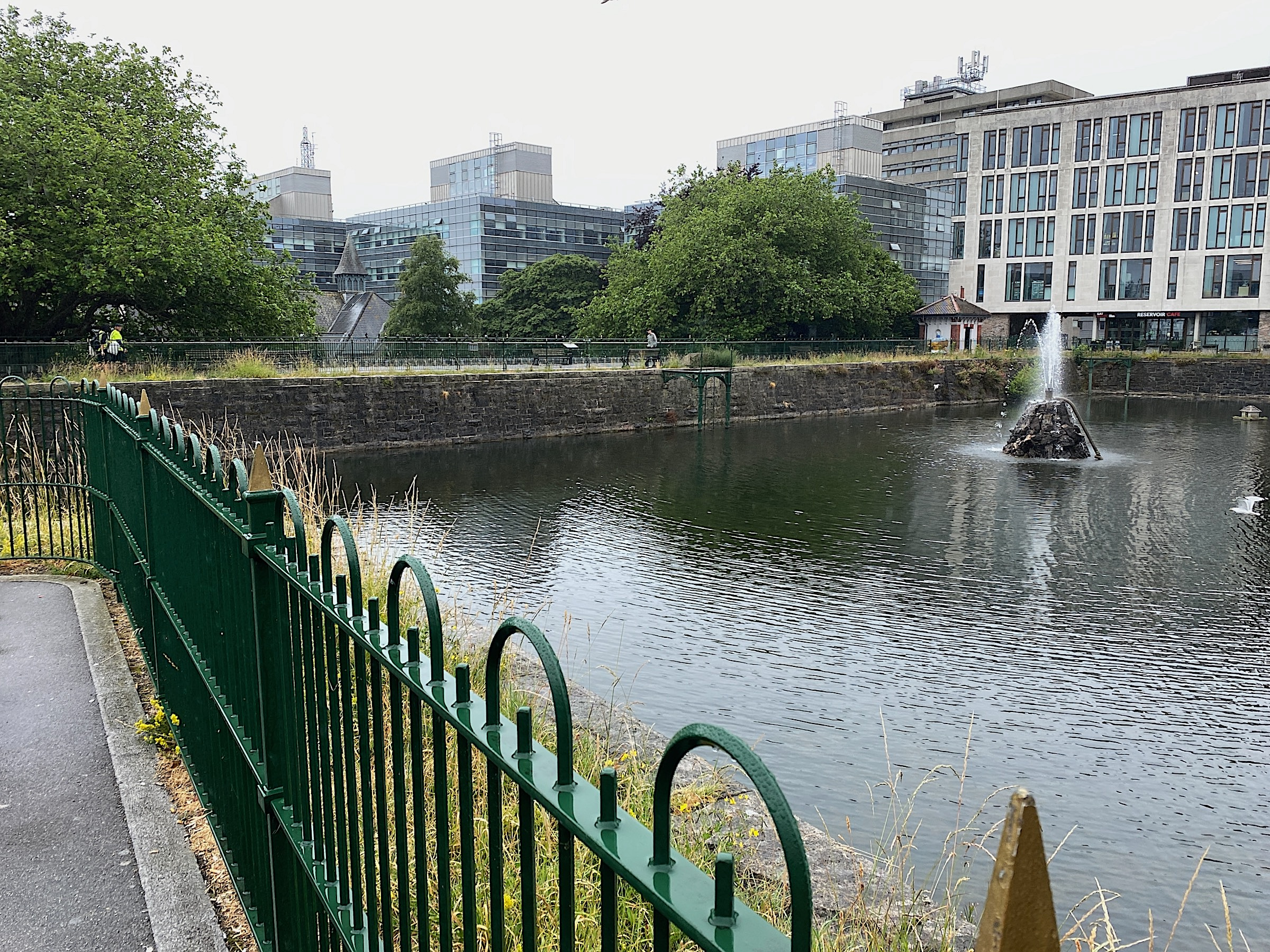
The reservoir

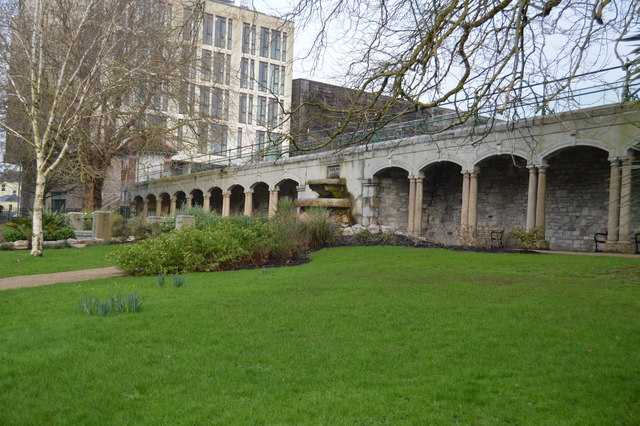
The Colonnade

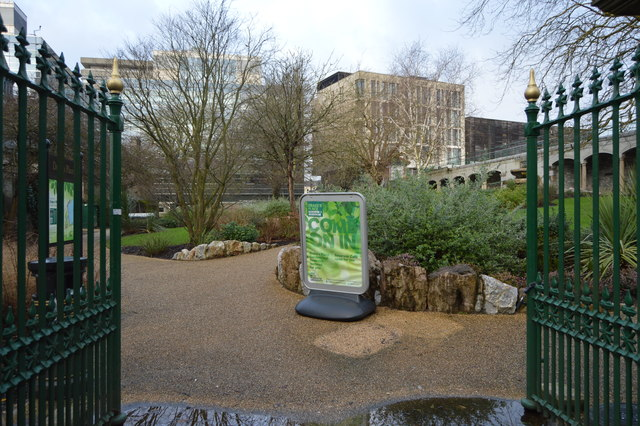
North Hill Gardens Entrance

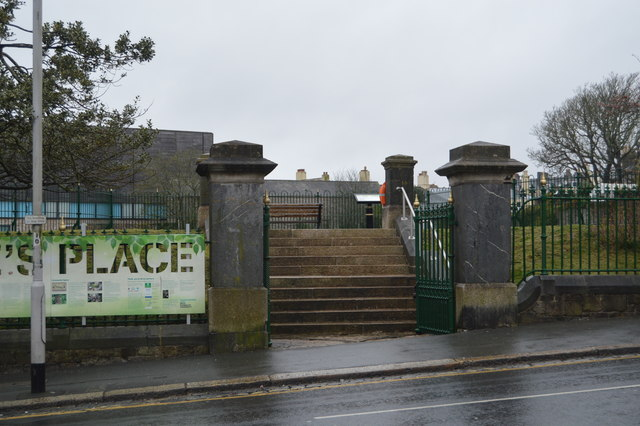
North Hill Colonnade Entrance

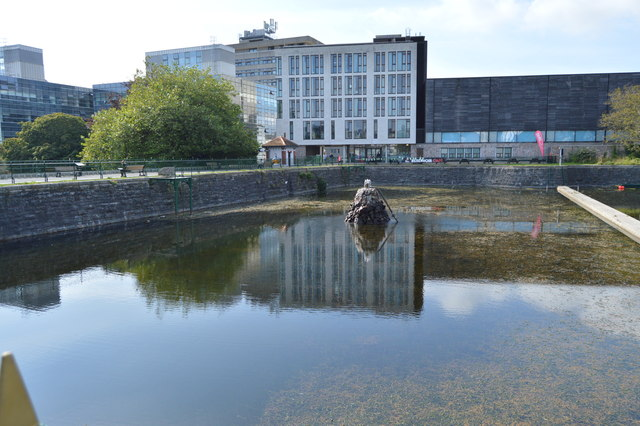
Reservoir looking towards the University campus

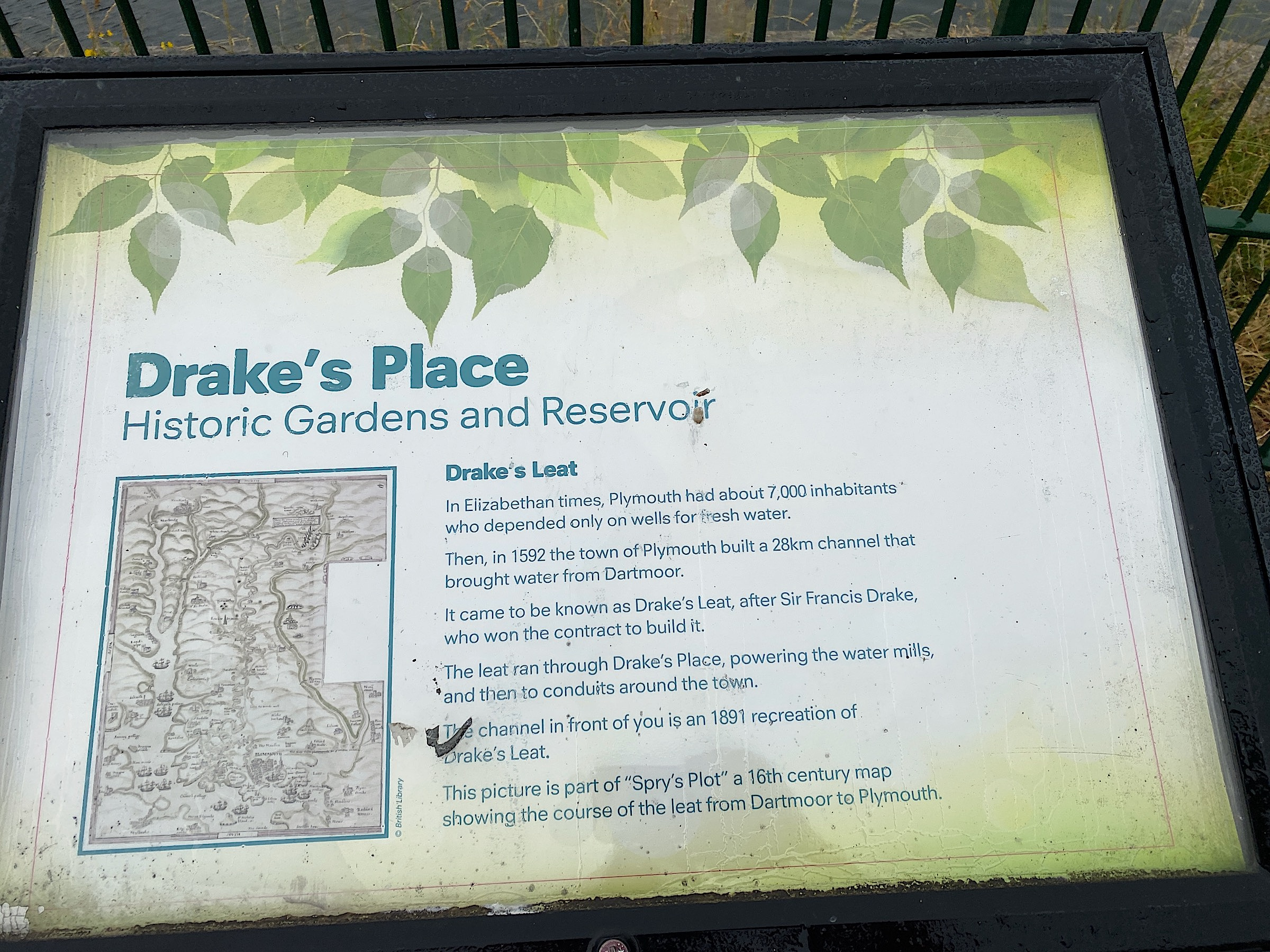
Information sign

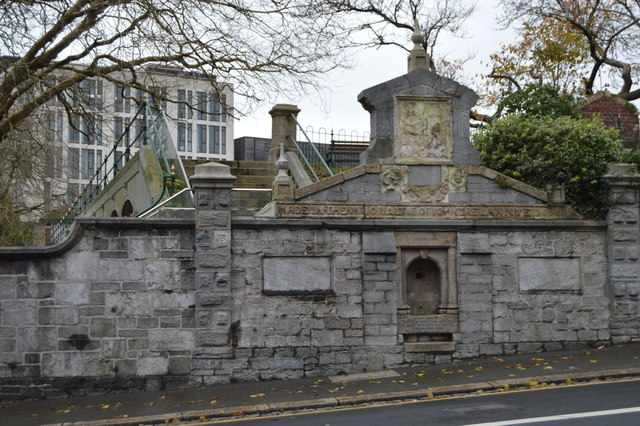
The water fountain

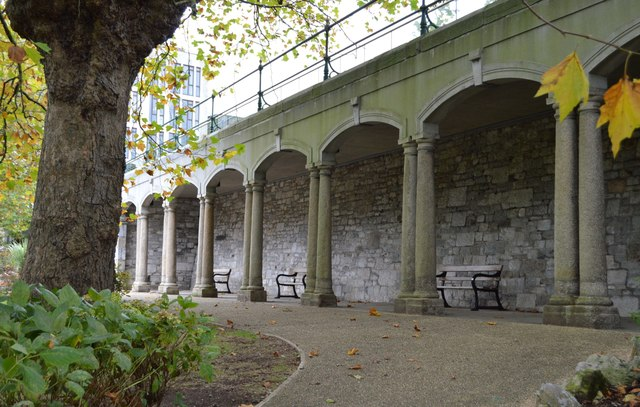
The restored Colonnade
