= Saltash Passage =

Coordinates: 50°24′11″N 4°11′56″W

Saltash Passage (or Riverside) is on the Devon side of the River Tamar, opposite Saltash. It is part of St Budeaux, an area of Plymouth in Devon. Saltash Passage lies at the northern end of Wolseley Road, previously known as Ferry Road. The local railway station continues to be known as Ferry Road Station. Saltash Passage is named after the ferry route that carried passengers and vehicles between Saltash in Cornwall and Plymouth, across the River Tamar. The ferry became uneconomic following the construction of the Tamar Bridge in 1961. Saltash Passage is a popular leisure destination for the locals as well as tourists in summer.

== Features ==
Apart from housing, Saltash Passage is home to two pubs: the Royal Albert Bridge Inn and the Ferry House Inn. The Ferry House Inn has recently been extended to include accommodation. The area also hosts the Tamar River Sailing Club, a number of moorings and 2 public slipways. There is a small park that has a children's playground. A visit to the gardens forms part of the itinerary of some coach tours. The public toilets have recently been removed, in line with current Plymouth City Council policy. Several high value houses have recently been built nearby. The river is not safe for weak swimmers, however.

=== Tamar Bridge and Royal Albert Bridge ===
The two bridges dominate the view to the north, the Tamar Bridge (opened 1961) carrying the A38 road and the Royal Albert Bridge (opened 1859) carrying the Cornish Main Line.

=== D-Day Memorial ===
A 12 foot tall memorial stone with a bronze plaque stands in the gardens, commemorating the embarcation of American and British troops for the D-Day landings of World War II. In 2004, a service was held for the 60th anniversary of D-Day.

=== Sea Scout Hut ===
There is a sea scout hut currently located in the old waiting room for the Saltash Ferry. Scouts can often been seen on the river in the summer in canoes.

== Wildlife ==
Many river birds can commonly be seen whilst sitting in the park, including a family of swans, several types of gulls, cormorants, oystercatchers, little egrets and the occasional grey heron. Jackdaws and pied wagtails also work the shore when the tide is out. Sometimes buzzards, kestrels and birds of prey can be seen hunting. Owls can often be heard at night.
