= St Philip's Church, Weston Mill =

Demolished church in Plymouth, England

St Philip's Church
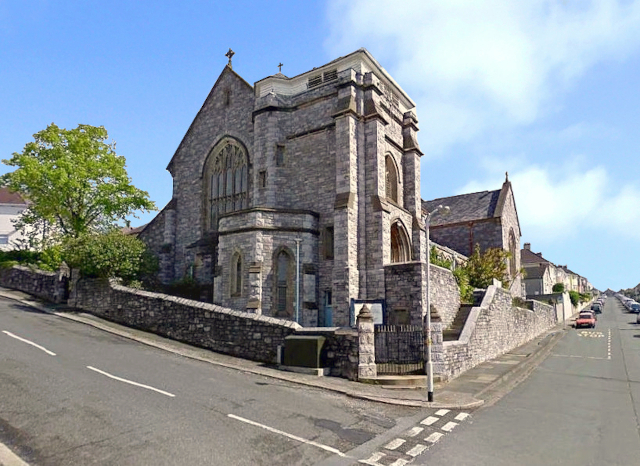
- The now-demolished St Philip's Church in 2009.

Religion
- Affiliation: Church of England
- Ecclesiastical or organizational status: Active
- Year consecrated: 1913

Location
- Location: Weston Mill, Plymouth, Devon, England
- Interactive map of St Philip's Church
- Coordinates: 50.3994°N 4.1788°W

Architecture
- Architect: Montague Alton Bazeley
- Type: Church
- Style: Perpendicular Gothic

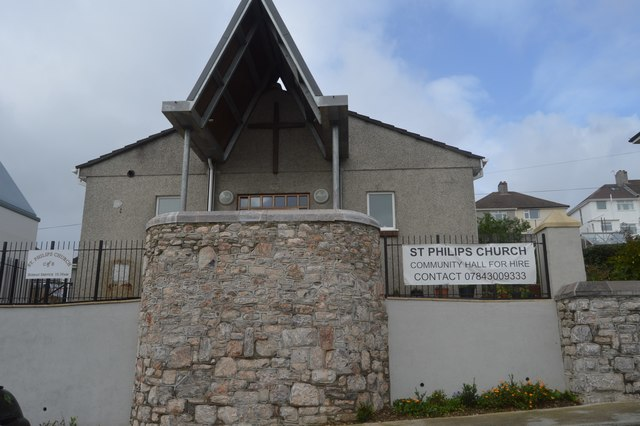
The present St Philip's Church was formerly the church hall.

St Philip's Church is a Church of England church in Weston Mill, Plymouth, Devon, England. The original church was built between 1912 and 1913 and was demolished for housing in 2014. The adjacent former church hall of 1981 has been the present St Philip's Church since 2012.

== History ==
=== Construction of St Philip's ===
St Philip's was built to serve the new district of Weston Mill in the parish of St Budeaux. The suburb was established in connection with the North Yard (Keyham) extension of Plymouth Dockyard, which was carried out between 1896 and 1907. The director of the works, Sir John Jackson, acquired approximately ten acres of land to provide housing for his workers and their families. Prior to the construction of a permanent church, Sir Jackson provided a mission hall near the site of the future church and another at Ocean Street.

In 1904, the district of St Philip and St James was formed within the parish of St Budeaux, covering a population of approximately 4,000 from both St Budeaux and Pennycross parishes. Rev. E. Synnott, who was the chaplain to Sir Jackson's employees in the dockyard, was licensed as curate-in-charge of the new district. During the same year, a site for a church was given by Richard Hall Clarke of Bridwell House, Cullompton, and, in turn, Rev. Synnott commissioned Bastick W. Nunn of Stoke to draw up the original plans for the church. Nunn designed a church with accommodation for 600, with a nave, north and south aisles, north and south transepts, an aspidal chancel, vestries, organ space, and a tower with spire. Following Nunn's death, revised designs were made by the local architect Montague Alton Bazeley.

The new church was one of twelve to be built under the Three Towns Church Extension Scheme for Plymouth and Devonport, and was one of two chapels of ease to the parish church, alongside St Boniface. The foundation stone was laid by the Bishop of Exeter, the Right Rev. Archibald Robertson, on 4 May 1912 and the church was constructed by Messrs Lapthorn and Co. Due to a lack of funds, only the permanent four-bay nave, north and south aisles, north and south transepts and the lower portion of the tower were built. At the east end, a temporary chancel, with choir and clergy vestries, was added, pending the future construction of a permanent chancel, along with the rest of the intended tower. Upon completion, the church cost £6,300 to build and had seating for approximately 500 people. It was consecrated by the Bishop of Exeter on 18 October 1913.

=== Later additions and developments ===
Although St Philip's remained without a permanent chancel and vicarage, a church hall was soon considered the top priority to further the work of the church, and provide a Sunday School and base for other organisations involved with the church. A scheme was approved for raising the funds for a hall in December 1921. Work began on the site in March 1924, with volunteers removing 2,000 tons of rock and earth from the site before erecting the hall. The scheme, which had no labour costs, cost £319 and the Bishop of Plymouth, the Right Rev. Howard Masterman, opened the new hall on 29 September 1924.

In 1933, St Philip became a parish church with the creation of a new parish from "contiguous portions" of those belonging to St Budeaux, St Boniface (Devonport) and St Thomas (North Keyham).

The church suffered some bomb damage during World War II, namely to its west window during a raid on 21 April 1941. In 1968, the temporary chancel, which also suffered some bomb damage during the war, was replaced by a concrete apse, which incorporated a large stained glass window by Dom Charles Norris depicting Philip the Apostle. A timber roof was added to the tower in 1976.

In 1978, the charted surveyors Taylor, Son & Creber recommended the demolition of the church hall and its replacement with a new building. Designs for the new hall were drawn up by D. J. Farrant and it was built in 1981.

=== Closure and demolition of original church ===
By the 2010s, declining congregation numbers and the financial burden of maintaining the church building led the Church of England to seek its closure, with the Church Commissioners devising a scheme for its demolition and the transformation of the adjacent church hall as a new place of worship. The church was closed in late 2012 and its congregation moved into the church hall.

Ahead of its impending closure, English Heritage assessed the church for potential listing in 2011–12, but it concluded that, while there was "clear local interest", it did not meet the standards for listing. In their Sustainable Neighborhoods Assessment for Weston Mill, the church was recognised by Plymouth City Council as having "significant townscape merit, making a significant and positive contribution to the character of the area".

Rogers & Jones Architects Ltd were commissioned by Aster Homes to draw up redevelopment plans for the site. Although the retention of the church for residential, community or office use was considered, it was decided that the "most practical, commercially viable and community appropriate solution was to seek a development that replaces the church with local needs residential accommodation whilst retaining and upgrading the existing church hall as a place of worship and community resource". In 2013, a planning application was submitted by Aster Communities and the Diocese of Exeter for the church's demolition and replacement with a block of six flats and five terraced houses. The application also included the refurbishment of and alterations to the church hall, and the creation of a memorial garden and parking and amenity space. Planning permission was obtained from Plymouth City Council in 2014 and the church was demolished that year. St Philip's remains an active place of worship in the former church hall.

== Architecture ==
St Philip's was built of Radford limestone, with dressings in Bath stone and slate roofs. It had a four-bay nave with a clerestory, north and south aisles and north and south transepts. Many of the church's windows were in early Perpendicular style, except for the Decorated windows in the transepts. A fifth bay provided the temporary chancel and this was replaced with the concrete semi-circular apse, with its Charles Norris window, in 1968.

The south-west tower was of two stages and had angle buttresses and a timber pyramid roof. A staircase for the choir vestry was provided as a smaller half-octagonal stair tower attached to the tower. The church's main entrance was approached by a flight of granite steps and there was a basement level providing the vestry and storage.

Original internal fittings included the font, made of Polyphant stone and designed and given by the architect, Montague Alton Bazeley, and the pulpit of oak on a stone base. Memorials to those of the district who fell in both World Wars were located in the south aisle. The World War I memorial, which was an oak mural tablet voluntarily made by Mr. Wallis of Bishopsteignton, was unveiled by the Archdeacon of Plymouth, the Ven. Whitfield Daukes, on 29 January 1933.

The church's organ was gifted to the church by Sir John Jackson upon its opening in 1913. It was built by William Hill & Son and was installed in St Philip's by Hele & Co. It was gifted to St Michael & All Angels Church in Cornwood in 2013.
