= Ford, Plymouth =

Suburb of Plymouth, Devon

Coordinates: 50.38°N 4.16°W

Ford
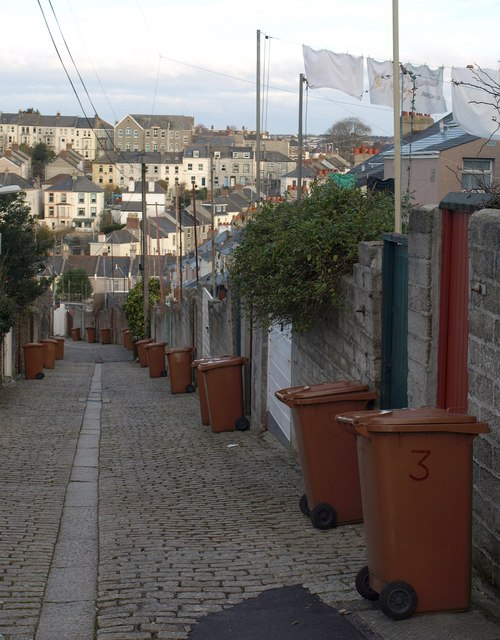
- A cobbled back alley in Ford

- Location within Devon
- OS grid reference: SX4656
- Unitary authority: Plymouth
- Ceremonial county: Devon
- Region: South West
- Country: England
- Sovereign state: United Kingdom
- Post town: PLYMOUTH
- Postcode district: PL2
- Dialling code: 01752
- Police: Devon and Cornwall
- Fire: Devon and Somerset
- Ambulance: South Western
- UK Parliament: Plymouth Sutton and Devonport

Ford is a Victorian-built area of Plymouth, in the ceremonial county of Devon, England. It lies 1.6 miles (2.6 km) north-west of the city centre, between the suburbs of Milehouse and Keyham.

Between 1890 and 1964 the area was served by Ford railway station.
