= St Budeaux Church of England Primary Academy =

Location
- Priestly Avenue; St Budeaux; Plymouth, Devon, BN20 8AB; England
- Coordinates: 50°24′34″N 4°10′31″W

Information
- Type: Academy
- Religious affiliation: Church of England
- Established: 1717; 309 years ago
- Local authority: Plymouth
- Trust: The First Federation Trust
- Department for Education URN: 149192 Tables
- Ofsted: Reports
- Head od School: Natasha Brooks
- Gender: Mixed
- Age: 2 to 11
- Enrolment: 172
- Website: http://www.stbfs.co.uk

St Budeaux Church of England Primary Academy is a Church of England primary school in the St Budeaux area of Plymouth, England, for pupils aged 2–11. There are 172 pupils.

== History ==
Founded in 1717 as the Saint Budeaux Foundation School, it is the oldest school in the area. Indeed, the school's website considers it might be the oldest free school in Britain. Originally for twelve children, in 1801 it was relocated to the Church Green poorhouse and in 1834 it became a national school, the Saint Budeaux National School, managed by the National Society for the Promotion of the Education of the Poor in the Principles of the Established Church. In 1903 the School became a "non-provided" School under the 1902 Education Act, then becoming named the Saint Budeaux Church of England Elementary School. Following the Education Act 1944 it became the Saint Budeaux Foundation Church of England Junior School. A new building was provided in 1981 because the previous building was needing to be demolished due to road building.

Previously a voluntary aided school administered by Plymouth City Council, in July 2022 St Budeaux Foundation Church of England Junior School converted to academy status. The school is now sponsored by The First Federation Trust, but continues to be under the jurisdiction of the Diocese of Exeter. In September 2023 the school extended its age range to 2 years old and was renamed St Budeaux Church of England Primary Academy.
