= St Boniface's Church, St Budeaux =

Demolished church in Plymouth, England

St Boniface's Church
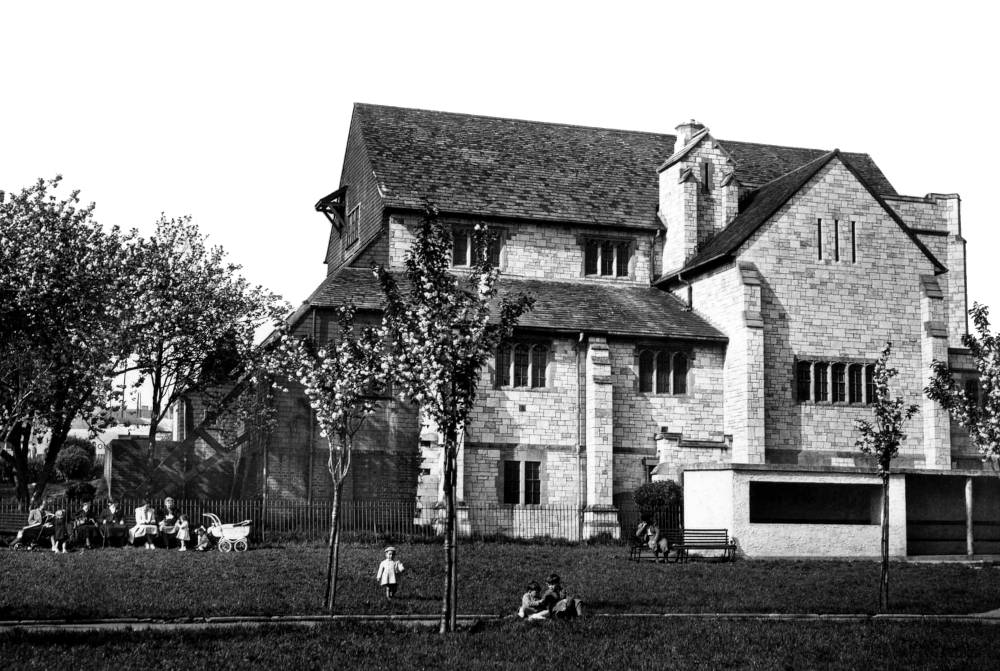
- The now-demolished St Boniface's Church in its original form, with an uncompleted west end.

Religion
- Affiliation: Church of England
- Ecclesiastical or organisational status: Active
- Year consecrated: 1913

Location
- Location: St Budeaux, Plymouth, Devon, England
- Interactive map of St Boniface's Church
- Coordinates: 50.4031°N 4.1864°W

Architecture
- Architects: William Douglas Caröe, Evans & Sloggett
- Type: Church
- Completed: 1965

St Boniface's Church is a Church of England church in St Budeaux, Plymouth, Devon, England. The original church was built between 1911 and 1913 to the designs of London architect William Douglas Caröe. Caröe's plans for the west end of the building, including a proposed tower, were never realised, although a concrete extension designed by Plymouth architects Evans & Sloggett was added in 1965.

Harry Stuart Goodhart-Rendel described the church as "an abundance of ugly and eccentric outlines". It was demolished in 2003, after a new combined church and church hall was built earlier in the same year to replace it. The new building remains an active place of worship.

== History ==
=== Plans for a new church and opening of a mission hall ===
St Boniface's Church was built as a chapel of ease to the parish church of St Budeaux, as a result of the area's growing population at the time. There was an urgent need for increased church accommodation in the parish, with an estimated 4,000 people living between one and two miles from the parish church, which itself was only able to seat approximately 300.

A movement calling for a new church was established in circa 1897, under the Three Towns Church Extension Scheme for Plymouth and Devonport. A congregation began meeting for Sunday services in a hired room from circa 1899 and they moved into the new Masonic Hall in 1900, but this was also found to be too small for the number of worshippers.

In 1900, a plot of land close to the Victoria Road railway station was given by Rev. Dr. Trelawny-Ross, Miss Hare and Miss Trelawny Collins. It was intended for both a church and a hall, and was given on the condition that the patronage of the new district of St Boniface would be vested in the Diocese of Exeter.

The establishment of a church was preceded by a mission hall, which initially served as a temporary place of worship before becoming the permanent parish hall (containing the Sunday schoolroom and recreation room) once the church was built. The hall, which cost approximately £800 to build and furnish, was able to seat 340 people and had its own small, temporary chancel. It was constructed by Messrs. Allen and Tozer of St Budeaux, with the foundation stone being laid on 17 December 1900 by Lady Jackson, wife of Sir John Jackson. It was opened for Divine service on 31 March 1901 and was dedicated by the Bishop of Exeter, the Right Rev. Herbert Edward Ryle, on 5 June 1901. Work then commenced on raising funds for the church.

=== Construction of St Boniface's Church and 1965 extension ===
A church with seated accommodation for 606 people was designed by William Douglas Caröe of London. It included a four-bay nave, north and south aisles, chancel, chapel, choir vestry (with organ chamber above), clergy vestry, north porch and a west tower. The basement contained a classroom.

The church was constructed by Mr. G. B. Turpin of Plymouth. The foundation stone was laid by the Bishop of Exeter, the Right Rev. Archibald Robertson, on 4 October 1911, and the church was consecrated by him on 14 May 1913. Due to a lack of funds, the west tower and one bay of the nave were excluded from the construction work and a temporary wall was erected in its place.

In 1916, the Ecclesiastical Commissioners formed the district chapelry of St Boniface, Devonport from within the parish of St Budeaux.

In 1960, a Church Extension Committee was established to raise funds and carry out the extension and completion of the west end of the building, including a tower and its intended peal of bells. The plans were drawn up by Evans & Sloggett of Plymouth and the concrete extension was completed in 1965, although it did not include the proposed tower.

=== Replacement and demolition of original church ===
By the 21st century, St Boniface was deemed "unsustainable" as it had become "too expensive to maintain, keep up and repair". In 2001, planning permission was granted by Plymouth City Council for the demolition of the 1901 church hall and the erection of a new combined church and church hall on the site. The new church and hall was designed by Maguire & Co. Ltd of Thame and construction was carried out in 2003. Under the planning conditions, the original church had to be demolished before the new one could be opened to the public. The Church Commissioners sold the original church to the Plymouth & South West Co-operative Society and they demolished the church in 2003.

The stained glass windows of c. 1965, designed by Dom Charles Norris, were salvaged from the original building and installed in the new one. The teak cross in the grounds was made from ship timber and was presented to the church by the Royal Navy in 1965. The site of the original church remained undeveloped for a number of years after its demolition. The Co-operative Society sold the site and Eliot Design & Build Ltd received planning permission in 2014 for the erection of 11 residential dwellings, which were subsequently built.
