= Peverell Park =

Cricket ground in Plymouth, England

Ground information
- Location: Plymouth, Devon
- Coordinates: 50.3909°N 4.1486°W
- Establishment: 1924
- Demolished: 2009

Team information
Devon	(1926–1975)
Minor Counties South	(1972)
- As of 27 July 2010; Source: Ground profile

Peverell Park was a cricket ground in Plymouth, Devon. The ground was located close to Plymouth Argyle's home ground, Home Park.

Plymouth Cricket Club initially played at Beacon Park, but by 1924 the pitches there became unavailable for cricket, necessitating the club to find a new home venue. Land was acquired from a farm and work to level and lay turf began, with this being completed in time for the 1925 season, complete a pavilion which cost £365. The ground was shortly thereafter incorporated into Central Park, with the cricket ground quickly becoming one of the most prestigious cricket venues in South West England. Devon first played minor counties cricket at Peverell Park in the 1926 Minor Counties Championship against Cornwall. For the first eight years of its existence, the ground was known to have a seven-metre height difference sloping from one side to the other; this was addressed between the end of the 1933 season and the start of the 1934 season, when it was levelled; it was noted that the outfield was soft and slow after these works. The original pavilion was adjudged to be inadequate by 1937, with a replacement being constructed according to a design by Plymouth city architect E. G. Catchpole. This was completed at a cost of £4,000 and was opened in August 1938 by Lionel Palairet.

The pavilion was only used for one year prior to the Second World War and was requisitioned during the war as a makeshift school for the next eight years. Peverell Park later hosted one List A cricket match in the 1972 Benson & Hedges Cup, when the Minor Counties South played Somerset. Somerset's Richard Cooper made 95 in a low-scoring match. Devon intermittently played minor counties cricket there until 1975, playing twenty Minor Counties Championship matches there. In the grounds later years, Plymouth Cricket Club struggled with its financial upkeep. In 1993, plans were announced to turn the ground into a wider sporting complex, followed by further plans in 1997 for the construction of a leisure centre. Neither of these came to fruition. With increasingly dilapidated facilities and the constant threat of eviction, Plymouth Cricket Club vacated Peverell Park in 2009, moving to the old United Services Ground at Mount Wise. The ground has since fallen into disrepair and the pavilion has been demolished.
