= Elburton =

Suburb of Plymouth, Devon, England

Coordinates: 50.3595°N 4.0633°W

- Location within Devon
- Unitary authority: Plymouth
- Ceremonial county: Devon
- Region: South West
- Country: England
- Sovereign state: United Kingdom
- Post town: PLYMOUTH
- Postcode district: PL9
- Dialling code: 01752
- Police: Devon and Cornwall
- Fire: Devon and Somerset
- Ambulance: South Western
- UK Parliament: South West Devon

Elburton is a small suburb of Plymstock, part of the City of Plymouth in the English county of Devon. It lies on the south eastern edge of Plymouth and is a gateway to the South Hams. Elburton is a dormitory area for the city and apart from a few older houses around the little shopping strip on Springfield Road, it is a very densely populated mix of extensive housing estates.

== Geography ==
Elburton has a small shopping area with a small supermarket, newsagent, post office, butchers, funeral service, chemist, bakery and four fast food takeaways. There are two pubs in the village as well as a garage.

== Politics ==
Elburton is contained within the Plymstock Dunstone ward of Plymouth City Council and is represented by Conservative Party councilor Nigel Churchill. Elburton inhabitants historically have voted Conservative in both local and national elections.

There is also Elburton Primary School which was attended by England Cricket Captain Heather Knight.
