= St Augustine's Church, Lipson =

Demolished church in Plymouth, England

St Augustine's Church
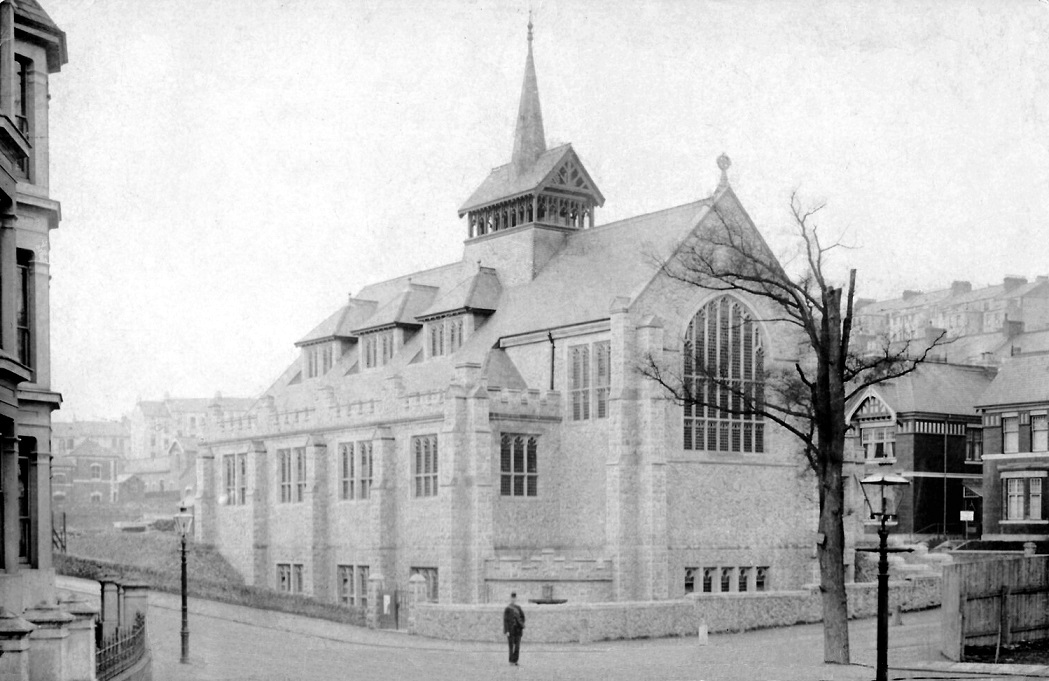
- St Augustine's Church in about 1915, prior to the completion of its west end in 1933.

Religion
- Affiliation: Church of England
- Ecclesiastical or organizational status: Demolished
- Year consecrated: 1904

Location
- Location: Lipson, Plymouth, Devon, England
- Interactive map of St Augustine's Church
- Coordinates: 50.3819°N 4.1255°W

Architecture
- Architects: King & Lister of Plymouth
- Type: Church
- Style: Gothic
- Completed: 1933

St Augustine's Church was a Church of England church in Lipson, Plymouth, Devon, England. Built to the designs of King & Lister of Plymouth, the church's crypt was built between 1899 and 1900, and initially served as a mission church until the main building was completed. Construction of the church was carried out between 1901 and 1904, but the west end was not completed until 1933. During World War II, the church suffered major damage in an aid raid and was rebuilt between 1950 and 1954. After closing as a place of worship in 1993, it was demolished in 2001 and replaced by the student accommodation block, St Augustine's House.

== History ==
=== Construction of St Augustine's ===
St Augustine's Church was one of a number of churches to be built under the Three Towns Church Extension Scheme for Plymouth and Devonport, launched in 1897. In order to provide a new church for the area of Lipson, the Three Towns Church Extension Society found a suitable site at the bottom of Alexandra Road and purchased it for £1,130 in 1898. The plans for the church were drawn up by architects King & Lister of Plymouth, who designed a church capable of seating up to 750 people.

The foundation stone was laid by the Bishop of Exeter, Edward Bickersteth, on 21 July 1899. The first phase of construction was the church's crypt, which was opened and dedicated by the Bishop of Crediton, Robert Trefusis, on 23 November 1900. It served as a mission church until the permanent church was built and had seating for 300 worshippers. Construction began on the north aisle and vestry between August 1901 and the spring of 1902. The chancel, organ chamber, north porch, and three bays of the nave, north and south aisles were commenced in October 1903. Due to limited building funds, the west end of the church was to be completed at a later date. St Augustine's was consecrated by the Bishop of Exeter, Archibald Robertson, on 15 October 1904. It had seating for about 500 worshippers. St Augustine's became a parish church when the ecclesiastical parish of Lipson was formed in 1905.

Fresh efforts commenced in May 1930 to increase the building fund and it had reached a sufficient amount for completing the church in 1932. Construction of the west end began in May that year and extended the church by about 30 feet. It included one large bay, a smaller bay, a west porch and a north-west choir vestry. The new addition was dedicated by the Bishop of Exeter, Lord William Cecil, on 23 April 1933. The total cost of the church, minus its furnishings, was £13,000.

=== World War II bomb damage and reconstruction ===
The church was badly damaged in an air raid on 13 June 1943 and the congregation were forced to worship at St Matthias Church at North Hill.

On 15 March 1945, the Bishop of Plymouth, Whitfield Daukes, consecrated and formally reopened the church's partially repaired crypt for Sunday services. This continued for a few years, although it was reported in 1949 that the crypt was "very damp" as the damaged north side and temporary roof were not waterproof.

Plans were made for St Augustine's to be rebuilt as an "identical reinstatement" except for the spire on its roof, which was to be moved from the centre to the west end of the building. The plans were drawn up by architect Ivan S. Hodgess of Plymouth and the cost of reconstruction was covered by the War Damage Commission. With the approval of scheme in 1949, the first phase of reconstruction began in 1950 on the crypt and walls. In May 1950, the Bishop of Plymouth dedicated the canteen of the nearby Beechwood Factory for its use by the congregation as a temporary church.

The crypt was rededicated by the Bishop of Plymouth, Norman Clarke, on 20 July 1951. It saw use as both a temporary church and hall until the main building was reconstructed. St Augustine's was completed and reopened in 1954.

=== Closure of church and demolition ===
St Augustine's closed as a place of worship in 1993 due to a dwindling congregation and the high costs of maintaining and heating the building.

In 1994, the Indoor Climbing Company proposed a £250,000 scheme to transform the church into an indoor climbing centre. The scheme was approved in 1995, but the company were unsuccessful in obtaining Heritage Lottery Funding and subsequently pulled out of negotiations with the Church of England.

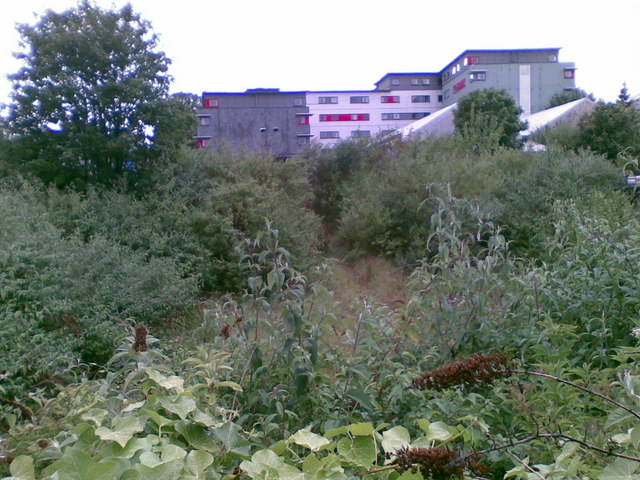
The site of the church awaiting redevelopment in 2011.

In 1998, the Church of England's Redundant Churches Committee were considering demolishing the church to make way for housing as they failed to find a new use for the building. A demolition scheme was approved by the Church Commissioners in 2001. Outline planning permission was also granted that year for the demolition of the church and the redevelopment of the site with a 6-storey building containing 36 sheltered housing units, a community church and hall, and parking. The demolition of the church was carried out in 2001, but the site remained "overgrown derelict land" for over ten years. A new redevelopment scheme was approved in 2010 for a 6-storey building of 85 units of student accommodation, St Augustine's House, which was built between 2012 and 2013.

== Architecture ==
St Augustine's was built of granite, with dressings of Doulting stone. The church was originally fitted with oak seating and stalls.
