= King's Tamerton =

Suburb of Plymouth, Devon, England

Coordinates: 50°24′25″N 4°10′40″W

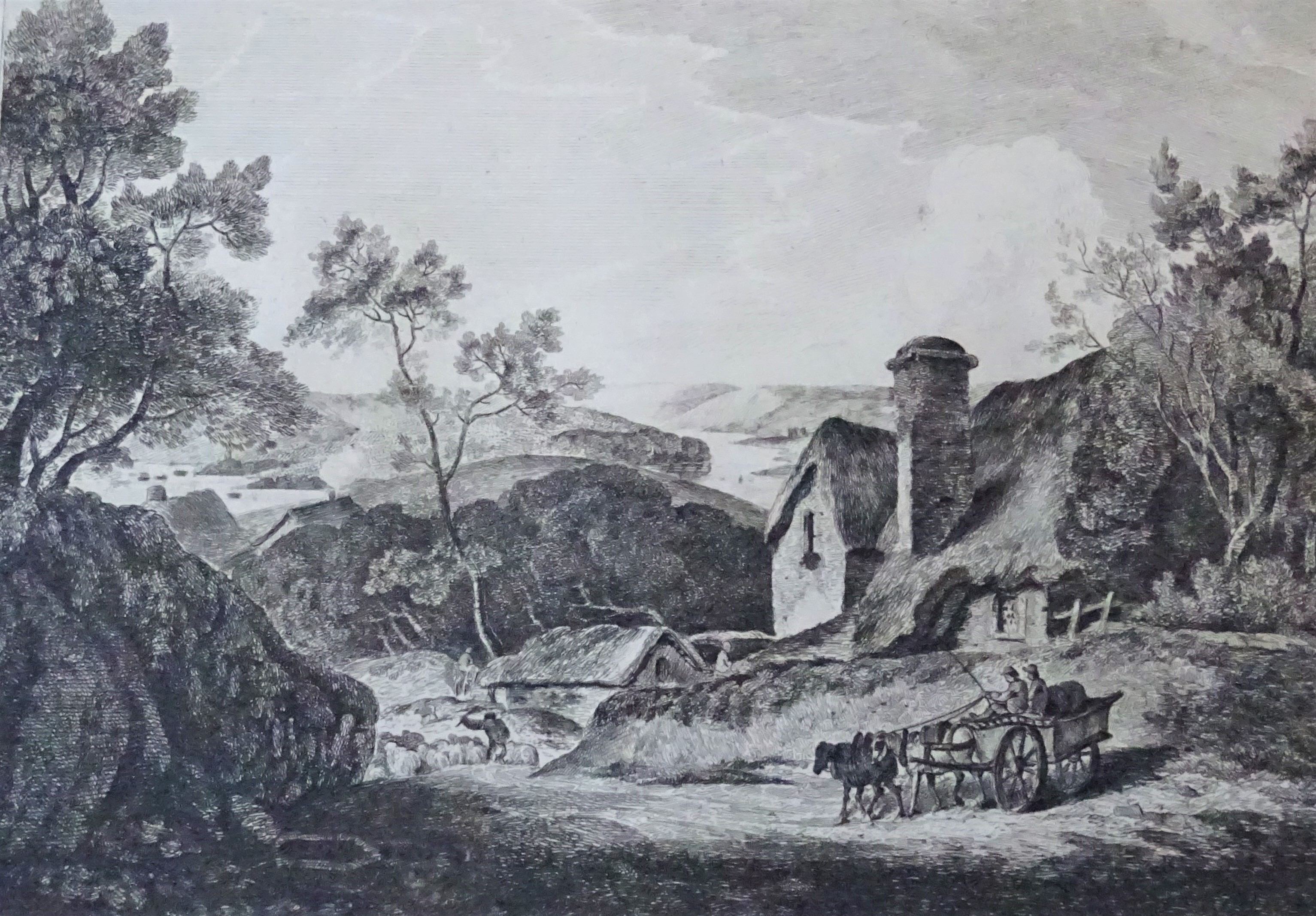
- King's Tamerton in 1805

- Location within Devon
- Unitary authority: Plymouth
- Ceremonial county: Devon
- Region: South West
- Country: England
- Sovereign state: United Kingdom
- Post town: PLYMOUTH
- Postcode district: PL
- Police: Devon and Cornwall
- Fire: Devon and Somerset
- Ambulance: South Western

King's Tamerton is a suburb of Plymouth in the county of Devon, England. It was largely built post-war adjacent to St Budeaux and overlooking the Naval base and the Hamoaze which is the wide estuary of the River Tamar.

Schools in the area include Marine Academy Plymouth.
