= St Jude's Church, Plymouth =

Church in Devon, England

St Jude's Church
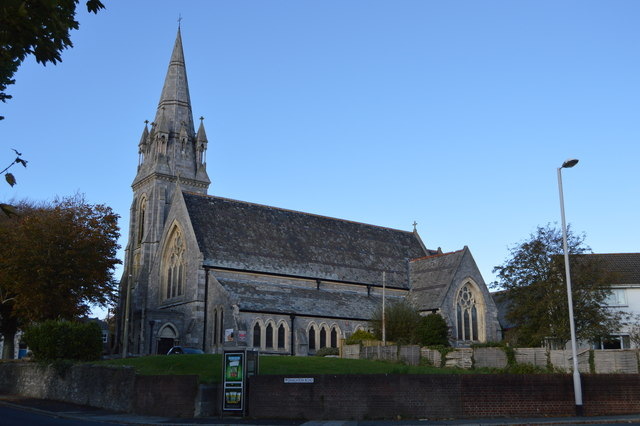
- St Jude's Church

Religion
- Affiliation: Church of England
- Ecclesiastical or organizational status: Active
- Year consecrated: 1876

Location
- Location: Plymouth, Devon, England
- Interactive map of St Jude's Church
- Coordinates: 50.3728°N 4.7576°W

Architecture
- Architect: James Hine
- Type: Church

St Jude's Church is a Church of England church in Plymouth, Devon, England. It was designed by the Plymouth architect James Hine and constructed in 1875–76, with the work being carried out by Messrs Blatchford and Son of Tavistock for £3,600.

Construction had begun by the time the memorial stone was laid on 26 October 1875 and the Bishop of Exeter Frederick Temple consecrated the church on 27 November 1876. It was the one of a number of churches to be erected under the auspices of the Three Towns Church Extension Society. A tower and spire were added to the church in 1881–82, with the work being carried out by Mr. Philip Blowey of Plymouth, followed by a church room in 1887–88.

St Jude's has been Grade II listed since 1975. It is described by Historic England as having an early and mid Gothic style. The church is briefly constructed using Plymouth limestone, with dressings in Portland and Bath stone. Upon completion it was able to seat approximately 650 people.
