= Marine Academy Plymouth =

Location
- Trevithick Road; Plymouth, Devon, PL5 2AF; England
- Coordinates: 50.40617°N 4.17577°W

Information
- Type: Academy
- Department for Education URN: 147967 Tables
- Ofsted: Reports
- Principal: Jennifer Brimming
- Gender: Mixed
- Age: 3 to 19
- Houses: Pegasus; Kraken; Phoenix; Griffin
- Publication: MAPNews
- Website: www.marineacademy.org.uk

Marine Academy Plymouth (formerly Tamarside Community College) is a mixed all-through school located in the King's Tamerton area of Plymouth in the English county of Devon. The school includes a nursery, primary, secondary and sixth form section.

Previously a community school administered by Plymouth City Council, Tamarside Community College was converted to academy status on 1 September 2010 and was renamed Marine Academy Plymouth. As an academy the school is sponsored by Plymouth University, Cornwall College and Plymouth City Council.

== Academics ==
Marine Academy Plymouth offers GCSEs and BTECs as programmes of study for pupils, while students in the sixth form have the option to study from a range of A-levels, Cambridge Nationals and further BTECs. The school also offers some vocational courses in conjunction with Cornwall College.

== School buildings ==
- Escher; named after M. C. Escher, the Dutch graphic artist. The upper floor of the building houses the Art, Technology and Catering classrooms whilst the ground floor includes Maths and English classrooms.
- New Build; the new building opened in 2013 and features three floors with each floor being designated a 'Learning Area'. The top floor is the Humanities and Languages area however the classrooms are also used for Health & Social Care lessons. The ELC (Effective Learning Centre) is also situated on this floor. The first floor consists of mainly English & Science classrooms however this floor also houses many offices including Technicians, Finance and the Principal's office. On the Ground floor you can find the Academies Area consisting of ICT, Business and the Beauty Salon. The Library, Canteen and Performing Arts Classrooms and Theatre are also situated on this floor.
- Sports Complex; Built in 1991 the Complex is equipped with a large Sports Hall and a Gym. Many community based activities are also held within the Complex. When needed the Sports Hall will also double as an Exam Hall for GCSE & A Level examinations.

== Marine Academy Primary (MAP2) ==
Marine Academy Primary is part of the first all-through school in Plymouth. Until Easter 2014 MAP2 was based in the remaining 1930s buildings after the new buildings were created for the Secondary side of the school. When the pupils returned after the Easter Holidays the newly created Marine Academy Primary building based south of the main campus was opened. Part of this new building is shared with the Sixth Form.
