= Greenbank, Plymouth =

Area of Plymouth, Devon, England

Coordinates: 50°22′39″N 4°07′50″W

Greenbank
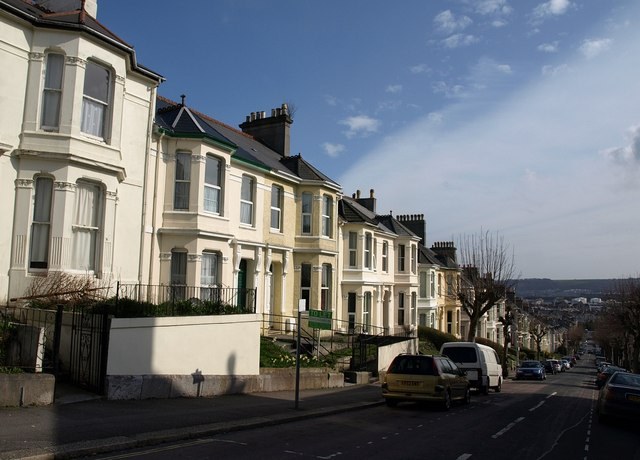
- Greenbank Avenue

- Location within Devon
- Unitary authority: Plymouth
- Shire county: Devon
- Region: South West
- Country: England
- Sovereign state: United Kingdom
- Post town: PLYMOUTH
- Postcode district: PL
- Police: Devon and Cornwall
- Fire: Devon and Somerset
- Ambulance: South Western

Greenbank is part of the city of Plymouth in the county of Devon, England. Greenbank, combined with University makes up the city's Drake ward. It is a Victorian and Edwardian residential area with many small public houses and shops, and is now favoured by students due to its proxomity with the University of Plymouth.

== History ==
The Greenbank area became host to the location of the city’s main workhouse in 1615. Following concerns over overcrowding and inadequate conditions at the Catherine Street workhouse, the Plymouth Incorporation selected a four-acre site at Specott’s Fields, near Greenbank Road. Construction of a new workhouse at Longfield Place began in 1852, and the building, designed by Arthur and Dwelly, was completed in 1858 at a cost of £12,500, with accommodation for up to approximately 700 inmates.

In 1849, Plymouth Borough Gaol (now known as Greenbank Prison) opened adjacent to the workhouse, designed by Thomas Fuller and William Bruce Gingell and was constructed by William Clift. In 1935, the prison was converted into a police headquarters.

In 1894 inspection by the British Medical Journal identified significant deficiencies in the infirmary, including poor internal layout, steep staircases, narrow passages, toilets being five floors away from some wards, and insufficient trained nursing staff. The report recommended building a new infirmary and increased staff members, between 1907 and 1910, the construction of new hospital facilities, comprising ward blocks, an administration building, and a nurses’ home.

From 1909 to 1929, the hospital was called Greenbank Infirmary, and was renamed in 1930 to Plymouth City (General) Hospital. In 1935 the city combined its various hospitals (including Plymouth City Hospital in Devonport) into Prince of Wales's Hospital. The hospital building was damaged by German bombing in 1943. In 1951 the Greenbank site became known as Freedom Fields Hospital under the NHS.

The hospital site was demolished and redeveloped into housing in 2000 as it remains today, but the central block of the former adjacent prison survived and was Grade II listed in 2007.

== Features ==
Greenbank lies to the west of Freedom Fields, a park preserving the approximate site of a battle during the English Civil War. It is home to a principal fire-station and formerly of Plymouth's two main hospitals, both recently demolished and redeveloped. It is a short walking distance from the city centre and sea front area as well as the university and Beaumont Park to the south.
