= Hartley, Plymouth =

Suburb of Plymouth, Devon, England

Coordinates: 50°23′32″N 4°07′37″W

Hartley
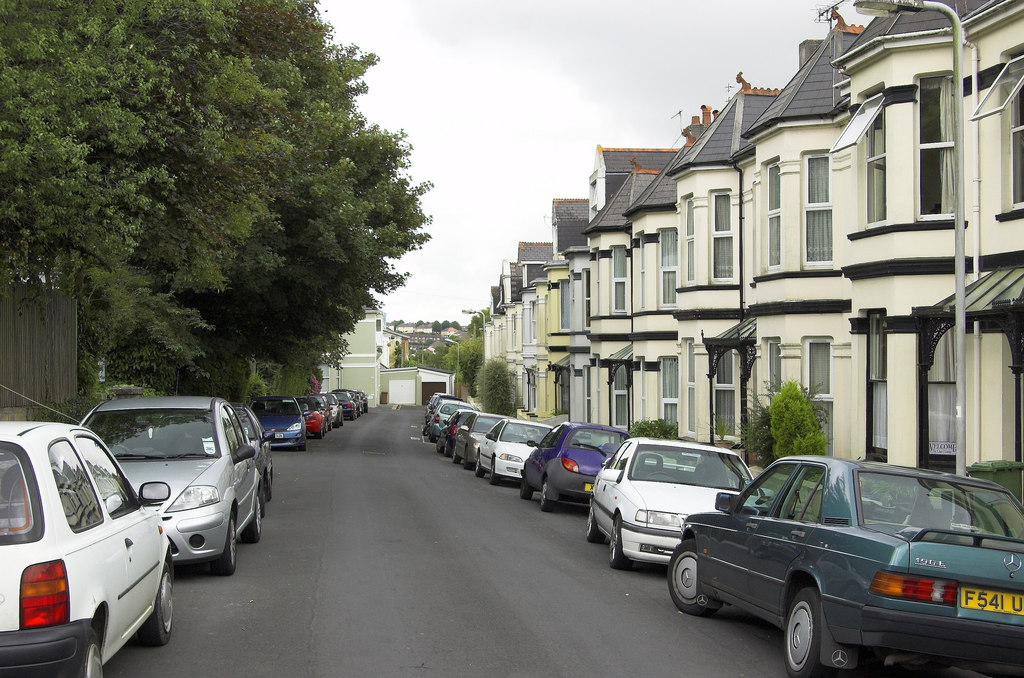
- Brandreth Road in Hartley

- Location within Devon
- Unitary authority: Plymouth
- Ceremonial county: Devon
- Region: South West
- Country: England
- Sovereign state: United Kingdom
- Post town: PLYMOUTH
- Postcode district: PL
- Police: Devon and Cornwall
- Fire: Devon and Somerset
- Ambulance: South Western

Hartley is a suburb of Plymouth in the county of Devon, England.

It is built on higher ground offering views south towards the sea, east into the South Hams, north over Dartmoor and west to Cornwall. It is bisected by the Tavistock Road which also provides ready access to Mutley and the City centre to the south and more immediate access to the A38 Plymouth Parkway, part of the Devon Expressway linking near Exeter to the motorway network.

Hartley has a nonconformist church, a large branch of Morrisons and is home to Plymouth Croquet Club to the side of Hartley Park and the small independent and Christian King's School. The former Plymouth Workhouse on the junction of Tor Lane and Tavistock Road has been demolished and rebuilt as a gated retirement community. There are some substantial Victorian villas mostly bordering the Tavistock Road, but much of the development particularly of the Venn Estate occurred just before the Second War.

The main entertainment in the area is the Golden Hind pub located at Manadon Roundabout.
