= St Budeaux =

Suburb of Plymouth, Devon

Coordinates: 50.403333°N 4.185556°W

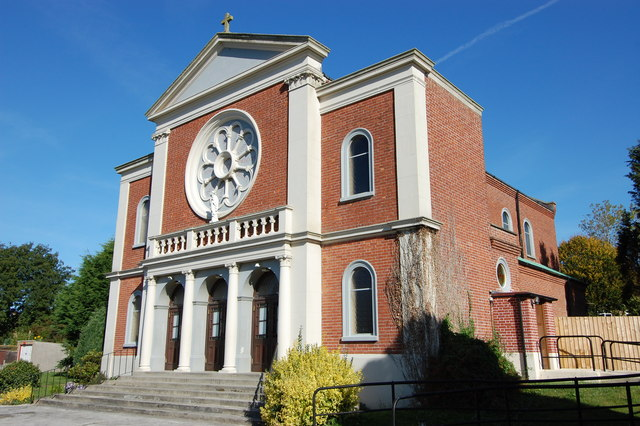
- St Paul's Catholic Church

- Location within Devon
- Population: 13,369 (2011)
- OS grid reference: SX4458
- Unitary authority: Plymouth
- Ceremonial county: Devon
- Region: South West
- Country: England
- Sovereign state: United Kingdom
- Post town: Plymouth
- Postcode district: PL5
- Dialling code: 01752
- Police: Devon and Cornwall
- Fire: Devon and Somerset
- Ambulance: South Western
- UK Parliament: Plymouth Moor View

St Budeaux is an area and ward in the north west of Plymouth in the English county of Devon.

== Original settlement ==
It is believed that the name St Budeaux comes from Saint Budoc, the Bishop of Dol (Brittany). An established legend suggests Budoc founded a settlement and built a small church around 480. This has been disputed by one historian, who argues that Budoc did not travel to the area, and instead his name was adopted by locals in the area. The church eventually gave way to a permanent stone one, dedicated to Saint Budoc, which was erected shortly before the Norman conquest of England.

The village is documented in William the Conqueror's Domesday Book of 1086. Known as Bucheside, it was valued at 30 shillings (around six times the amount of neighbouring manors). Over the course of the next few hundred years, Bucheside became Bodekishide, Budeokshed, and even Bottockishide and Butshead, the latter form being recorded on the Trevill monuments in the church. The modern name, St Budeaux, is itself a Frenchified "elegant" form.

== 15th to 18th centuries ==
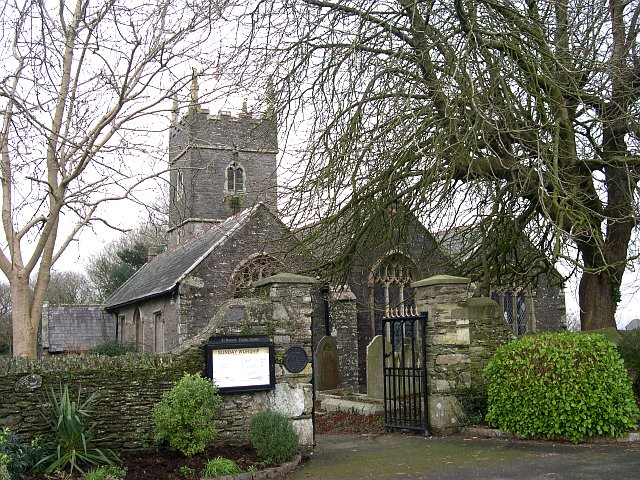
The Parish Church of St Budeaux

St Budeaux became a separate parish in 1482 by the decision of the Bishop of Exeter. During the early Tudor period, demand grew for a larger church, which was completed in 1563. The church was described in 1804 as "a simple edifice, and, though devoid of architectural embellishment, possesses much picturesque beauty."

On 4 July 1569, Sir Francis Drake married local woman Mary Newman, who was later buried here in 1582). There is an area of debate surrounding the origins of Mary Newman, with local tourism in Saltash promoting Mary Newman's Cottage. However, other academics, including Susan Jackson have challenged this claim. It is argued that Mary Newman was a native of St. Budeaux.

During the Civil War, Plymouth and its surrounding villages (including St Budeaux) swore an oath to die for the Parliamentarian cause. They were besieged by the Royalist Cornwall just across the water, which took control of St Budeaux and used the church as a garrison. The church was virtually destroyed by the war's end and was not restored until 1655.

== 19th century ==
In 1805, a Gunpowder Works was established alongside Kinterbury Creek for the purpose of restoring damp or damaged gunpowder offloaded from ships. This hazardous process involved unpacking the powder from its barrels, assessing and sieving it, and then "restoving" it (i.e. drying the damp powder in specialized ovens) after which it would be stored in a magazine once more ready for use. At the time the main magazine lcomplex for Plymouth was at Keyham, but when land there was required for development of the Dockyard a new location was needed; so in 1852, the Board of Ordnance opened a new depot alongside the Works at St Budeaux; named Bull Point, it could accommodate up to 40,000 barrels of powder. RNAD Bull Point closed in 2009 but remains in MoD ownership; the site includes some 48 listed buildings.

In 1860, the War Department purchased a sizable amount of land in the area due to Prime Minister Lord Palmerston's fear of the French, then ruled by Napoleon III. His fear was exaggerated, and the line of military forts encircling Plymouth later became known as "Palmerston's Follies." However, the upheaval contributed to an increase in the local population and a subsequent change in the area's character. Agaton Fort (see below) was only 480 yards (440 m) to the north of St Budeaux and was completed in 1871.

In 1890 the first railway station master was commissioned his name was Edmund Tolley. He was a well respected member of the community and well known to the locals.

In the 1890s, the parish became a self-contained village with significant development in Lower St Budeaux. Much of the development was incited by General John Trelawney, formerly John Jago, who inherited a great deal of St Budeaux's land from his uncle in 1883. In 1890, the village was already growing due to the construction of the Royal Albert Bridge and the improvement of area roads, as well as a new London and South Western Railway station, St Budeaux Victoria Road. There was also a Great Western Railway station at Ferry Road. In the following decade, Trelawney built houses and roads and sold to Joseph Stribling the land that would become the Trelawny Hotel in 1895. The hotel included two bars, a bar parlour, a club room, a coach house, outbuildings, stables and yards, and was the first building in St Budeaux to be lit by electricity. Many new shops also opened in the area during the same time period.

In 1899, St Budeaux merged with the town of Devonport, resulting in many improvements to local roads and communications availability. Improvements included the construction of a new railway bridge enabling the Devonport and District Tramway Company to provide efficient service from Devonport, through St Budeaux, to Saltash Passage, linking Plymouth to Cornwall.

== 20th century ==
In 1918, following World War I, St Budeaux and the other towns and villages in the treatment were amalgamated into the city of Plymouth. Amid the heavy demolition and construction of this period, six more churches were built in the parish. Much of this activity was initiated by the Plymouth Corporation, which made a habit of buying up the estates of principal landowners and destroying them in order to develop new amenities on the land. The vicar of St Budeaux church at the time, the Reverend T. A. Hancock, was appalled by the corporation's actions and protested in the 1930s, but to no avail.

Many homes in the region were bombed during World War II, and subsequent rebuilding resulted in a rapid housing explosion.

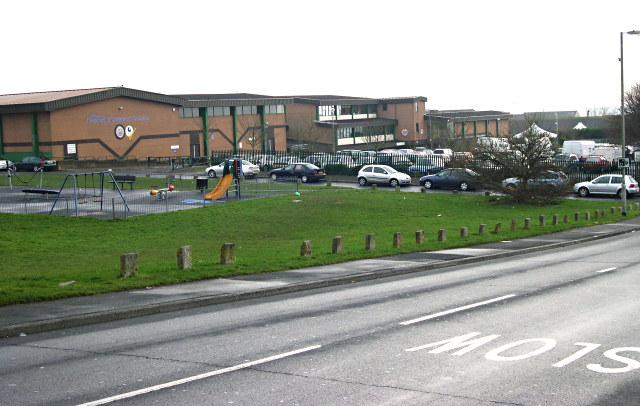
Tamarside Community College

== Modern St Budeaux ==
Today, St Budeaux includes a Catholic church, a Methodist church, a Baptist church and two Church of England churches (St Budeaux and St Boniface). It also has a public library, three pubs, four primary schools (including St Budeaux Church of England Primary Academy) and two railway stations (St Budeaux Ferry Road and St Budeaux Victoria Road), although the village does not have its own secondary school. Most of the main shops including a KFC outlet, are situated in St Budeaux Square which is adjacent to Wolseley Road. Most children of secondary school age in the area attend Marine Academy Plymouth in the nearby ward of King's Tamerton or bus to one of the residual grammar schools or one of the many other community colleges.

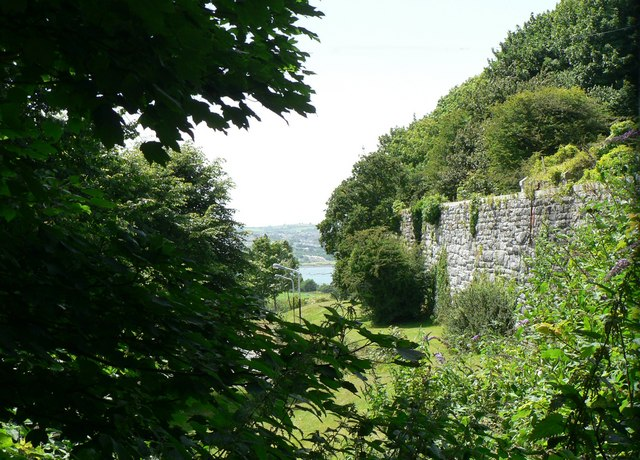
The western wall of Agaton Fort

== Agaton Fort ==
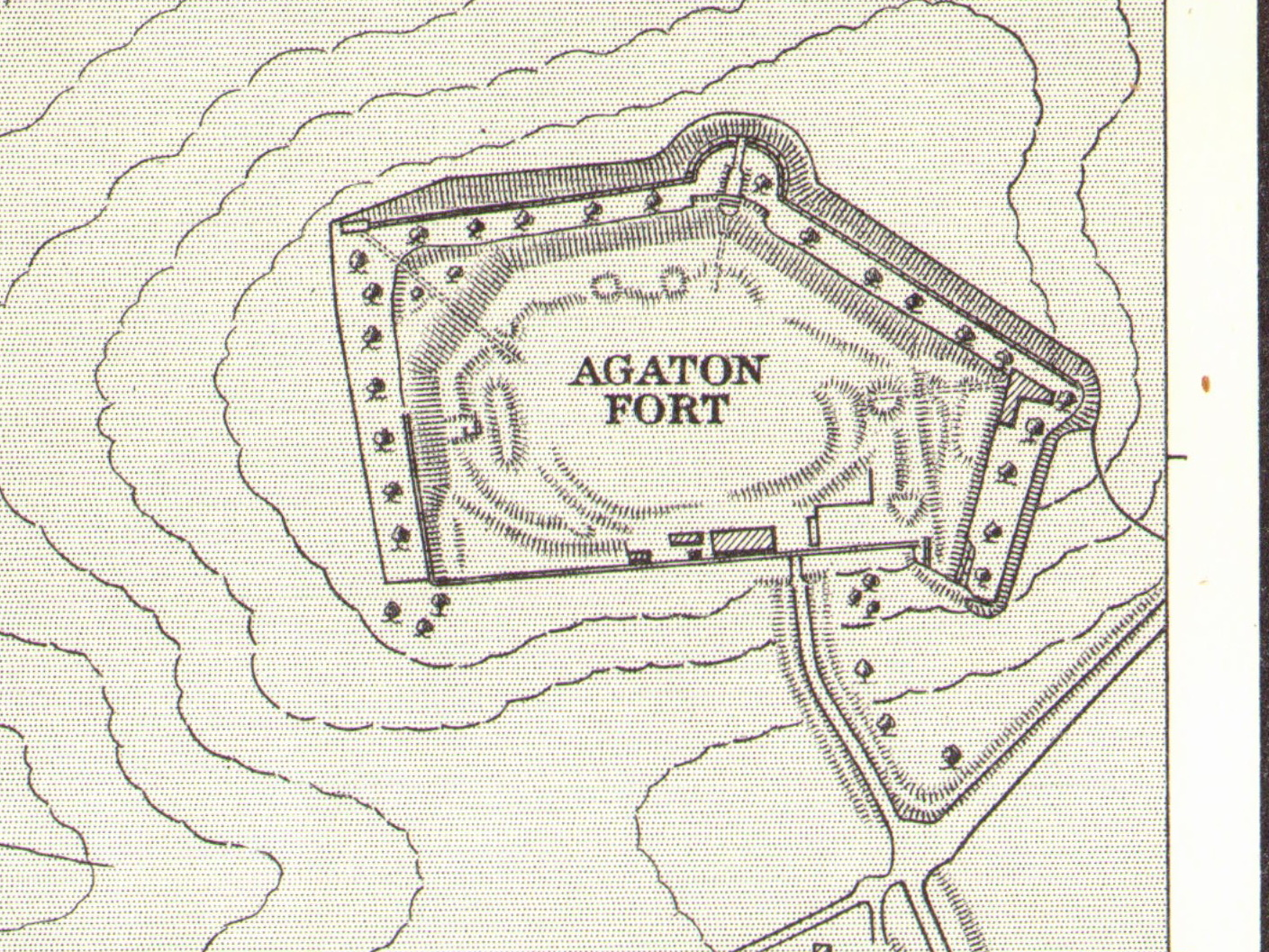
Plan of Agaton Fort

Part of the north-eastern defences of Plymouth, work on Agaton Fort started in 1863 on a hill near the hamlet of Agaton, in the parish of St Budeaux. It is a five-sided polygonal fort, and was designed to mount fifteen 7-inch guns which could mutually support the neighbouring Ernesettle Fort and Knowle Battery. The initial contractor failed in 1866 and the work was completed in 1871 by Royal Engineers. Only three of the 7-inch guns were ever mounted, along with five 64-pounder guns for close defence. It was also protected by a dry ditch and three caponiers. The fort was disarmed in the 1890s, but continued in military use through both World Wars. It is now a VOSA Test Station and is a Scheduled monument.

In 2020, Agaton Fort was used as a temporary mortuary facility in response to the 2019-20 coronavirus pandemic.

== Historic estates ==
- Budockshed
