= Ham, Plymouth =

Suburb of Plymouth, Devon

Coordinates: 50°23′47″N 4°09′48″W

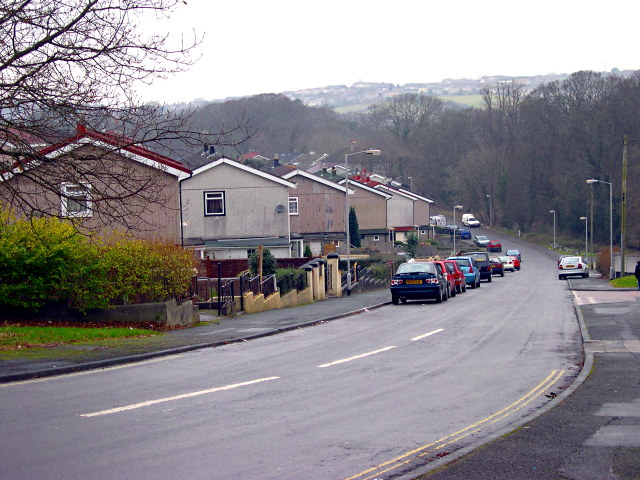
Dryburgh Crescent, a street in Ham

Ham is a post-war suburb of Plymouth in the county of Devon, England. The population of the ward taken at the 2011 census was 13,294.

== Etymology ==
The first securely dated attestation of the name of this settlement is in 1201, in the form Westoneshamme (whose first element is the name of the parish in which Ham sits, Weston Peverel). The name Ham comes from the Old English word hamm, meaning "water meadow, land in the bend of a river". Ham gave its name to the seventeenth-century Ham House, home of the Trelawney family, nearby, and to the River Hamoaze.

== Geography ==
It is about 4 miles north of the present city centre and has suffered from its proximity to the once notoriously rough area called North Prospect. Close to the dockyard and naval Base as well as the A38 Plymouth Parkway the area has become convenient and desirable.
