= Compton, Plymouth =

Suburb of Plymouth, England

Coordinates: 50.388889°N 4.120278°W

Compton
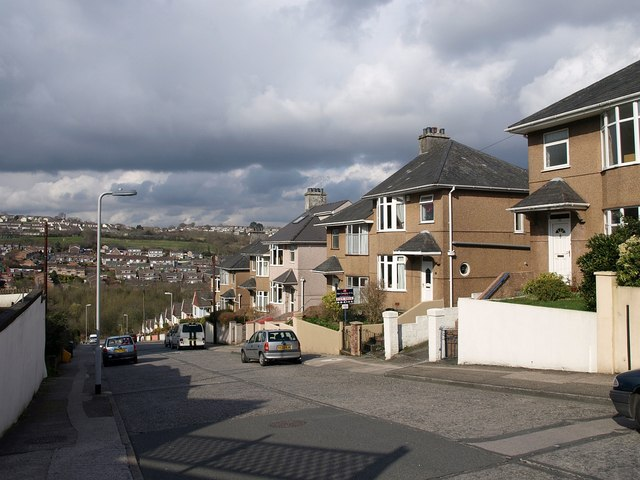
- Hollycroft Road in Compton

- Location within Devon
- Population: 12,677 (2022)
- Unitary authority: Plymouth
- Ceremonial county: Devon
- Region: South West
- Country: England
- Sovereign state: United Kingdom
- Post town: PLYMOUTH
- Postcode district: PL3 6xx
- Dialling code: 01752
- Police: Devon and Cornwall
- Fire: Devon and Somerset
- Ambulance: South Western

Compton or Compton Gifford is a suburb of Plymouth, in the ceremonial county of Devon, England.

Once a small village, it was developed in the 1930s and now lies between the suburbs of Peverell, Mannamead and Efford. There are two parts, Higher and Lower Compton named after two farms and now distinguished by their respective public houses.

== History ==
=== 800–1000: Founding ===
Neolithic stone axes were found in Compton from 3000 BC, predicted to have been made in Penzance, Callington, or Camborne. Compton officially began appearing on maps in approximately 800 AD as the Manor of Compton.

The 1086 Domesday book had the following entry for Compton: "Stephen holds Compton from Iudhael. Oswulf held it before 1066. It paid tax for 1 hide and 1 virgate of land. Land for 4 ploughs, which are there; 2 slaves, 6 villagers, and 4 smallholders. Meadow 1 acre, Underwood 20 acres. 5 cattle, 2 pigs, 52 sheep. Value formerly and now 30 shillings."

=== 1000–1895: Culme Estate ===
Compton is also mentioned in 1238 due to its prominence on the route to the new Plym Bridge, Plympton, and Eggbuckland. The Gifford in Compton Gifford, dates back to around 1100 when the granddaughter of Guy de Bockland, Isabella brought the estate to her husband Osbert Giffard. The estate continued in their family until 1342.

By 1730 Compton was part of the Culme estate, however upon the death of the last member of that family in 1804 Compton began to grow. During this time there were not many buildings, with the Compton Inn being the oldest and from about 1857 it has been a pub. Priory House in Lower Compton, built by Captain Bremner, is one of the last remaining large houses from this time. The Rising Sun Inn, now located on Eggbuckland Road, was originally cottages. The original door knockers for each cottage can still be seen inside the pub. In the 1700s, it was transformed into an alehouse, originally known as Hoopers ale house at the time.

=== 1896–present ===
From 1894 to 1896 Compton Gifford was an urban district. In 1896 the Tything of Compton Gifford was incorporated into the Borough of Plymouth. At the time, the decision to merge the two areas was not popular with Compton's residents due to an increased tax rate as a result of the incorporation.

Compton-Gifford was formerly a tything in the parish of Charles-the-Martyr, in 1866 Compton Gifford became a separate civil parish.

In 1893, boundary stones were erected to mark the limits of Compton Gifford under the Compton Gifford Local Board. Unlike earlier parish boundary stones, which clearly identified parish entry points, the later stones inscribed “1893 / C.G.L.B / R.N.W.” and numbered do not follow a consistent numerical sequence around the boundary, and some appear to be missing. A previously unrecorded boundary stone was later discovered near Eggbuckland Road in 2013.

In 1931 the parish had a population of 695. On 1 April 1939 the parish was abolished and fully merged with Plymouth.
