= Lipson =

Suburb of Plymouth, Devon

Coordinates: 50°22′36″N 4°7′36″W

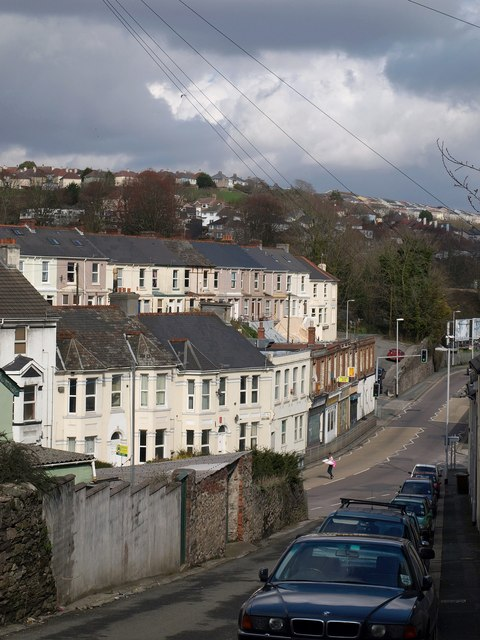
- Terraces in Lipson Vale

- Location within the United Kingdom
- Country: England
- Sovereign state: United Kingdom

Lipson is a ward in the city of Plymouth, England. It is an area with mixed terraced housing, some subdivided into bedsits and flats and a public open-space called 'Freedom Fields', a Civil War battle site where the townsfolk of nearby Plymouth resisted substantial Cavalier raiding parties and enabled the town to sustain the royalist siege. Freedom Fields existed before the Civil War and acquired its name after the defeat there of a French invasion force two hundred years earlier. The park was the inspiration behind the title of local folk singer-songwriter Seth Lakeman's third album and currently has a small cafe, numerous benches and flower-beds.

Formerly the site of Plymouth's biggest hospital (Freedom Fields Hospital), the borough prison, and fire and ambulance stations, it now retains only the (rebuilt) fire station.

Much of the housing stock consists of Victorian and Edwardian terraces with a few larger detached and semi-detached housing around the Queen's Gate/ Queen's Road area. Due in part to its proximity to the city's university and the size of some of the older properties, some of the housing towards Greenbank has been subdivided into homes of multiple occupancy and flats. Social housing can be found to the north-east along Lipstone Crescent.

Because of its hilly position, much of the area offers panoramic views in most directions, not least south across Plymouth Sound. Plymouth's main retail shopping centre, Plymouth University, and Plymouth Railway Station are all within reasonable walking distance. Shopping in Lipson is limited to a handful of takeaways and small grocery shops. Currently, as of 2021, there is a small Tesco outlet near Lipson Vale.

Lipson has a few schools, including Lipson Co-operative Academy.

The area was once served by the Church of England's St Augustine's Church, which closed in 1993 and was demolished in 2001.

Public transport is provided by Plymouth Citybus in the form of three bus routes. 8/9 and 20/21 via Lipson Vale and 23/24 via the Queens Road Triangle and the Mount Gould estate and hospital.

== See also ==
- List of wards in Plymouth
