= Peverell =

Suburb of Plymouth, Devon, England

Coordinates: 50°23′15″N 4°08′28″W

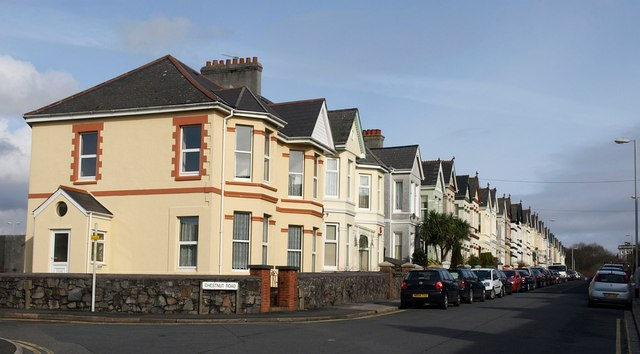
- Chestnut Road

- Location within Devon
- Population: 13,553 (2011 census)
- Unitary authority: Plymouth
- Ceremonial county: Devon
- Region: South West
- Country: England
- Sovereign state: United Kingdom
- Police: Devon and Cornwall
- Fire: Devon and Somerset
- Ambulance: South Western

Peverell (anciently Weston Peverell) is a neighbourhood of Plymouth in the ceremonial county of Devon. The 2001 Census estimated the population as 6,455, increasing dramatically to 13,553 at the 2011 census.

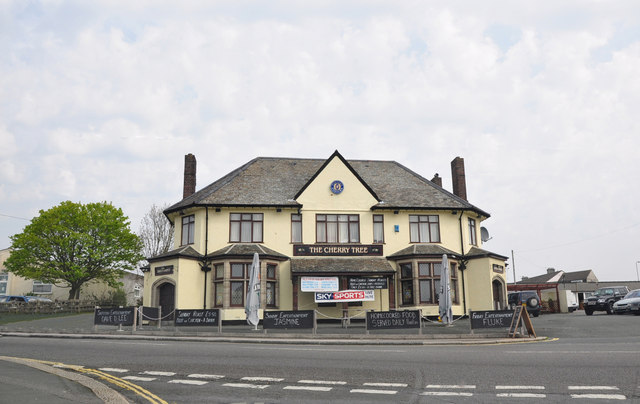
The Cherry Tree public house, Pennycross

== History ==
The area was originally part of the manor of Weston, listed in the Domesday Book of 1086 as the 73rd of the 107 holdings of Juhel de Totnes (died 1123/30), Feudal baron of Totnes. It was later acquired by the Peverell family of Ermington in Devon, after which it became known as "Weston Peverell" to distinguish it from other similarly named places. It passed via the heiress Amicia Peverell to her husband Nicholas Carew (died 1311) of Carew Castle in Pembrokeshire and of Moulsford in Berkshire, the founder of the prominent and widespread Carew family of Devon and Cornwall. (see Baron Carew, Earl of Totnes, Carew baronets) The manor of Weston Peverell was later subdivided.

== Description ==
Two of the main roads are named Peverell Park Road and Weston Park Road. The area now consists mostly of Edwardian terraced houses, but also includes schools and a number of churches. Peverell borders Central Park, often known as "the green lung" of Plymouth which is a very popular recreational area for Plymothians.

Peverell is seen by residents and real estate agents as a safe solid and central area with a good quality housing stock and few social problems.

The terms on which the land was sold for development at the turn of the twentieth century stipulated that no licensed premises (pubs), should be built on the land, as the seller was a strict abstainer. For a very long time there were no licensed premises in the area until the Roam Brewing Company Taproom opened in 2019 on the site on Weston Park Road, of an eighteenth century brewery. The long absence of pubs resulted in the district having a residential atmosphere, with very few problems apart from traffic (and parking) problems associated with its proximity to the local football club, Plymouth Argyle.

The area is served by the St Gabriel's Church, which was built between 1909 and 1910, with extensions in 1924 and 1955.
