= List of schools in Plymouth =

This is a list of schools in Plymouth in the English county of Devon.

== State-funded schools ==
=== Primary schools ===
- Austin Farm Academy
- Beechwood Primary Academy
- Boringdon Primary School
- The Cathedral School of St Mary
- Chaddlewood Primary School
- College Road Primary School
- Compton CE Primary School
- Drake Primary Academy
- Eggbuckland Vale Primary School
- Elburton Primary School
- Ernesettle Community School
- Ford Primary School
- Glen Park Primary School
- Goosewell Primary Academy
- High Street Primary Academy
- High View School
- Holy Cross RC Primary School
- Hooe Primary Academy
- Hyde Park Infants' School
- Hyde Park Junior School
- Keyham Barton RC Primary School
- Knowle Primary School
- Laira Green Primary School
- Leigham Primary School
- Lipson Vale Primary School
- Manadon Vale Primary School
- Marine Academy Plymouth
- Marlborough Primary Academy
- Mary Dean's CE Primary School
- Mayflower Academy
- Millbay Academy
- Montpelier Primary School
- Morice Town Primary Academy
- Morley Meadow Primary School
- Mount Street Primary School
- Mount Wise Community Primary School
- Oakwood Primary Academy
- Oreston Community Academy
- Pennycross Primary School
- Pilgrim Primary Academy
- Plaistow Hill Primary School
- Plympton St Mary's CE Infant School
- Plympton St Maurice Primary School
- Pomphlett Primary School
- Prince Rock Primary School
- Riverside Community Primary School
- St Andrew's CE Primary School
- St Budeaux CE Primary Academy
- St Edward's CE Primary School
- St George's CE Primary Academy
- St Joseph's RC Primary School
- St Mary's Priory Junior Academy
- St Maththews CE Primary Academy
- St Paul's RC Primary School
- St Peter's CE Primary School
- St Peter's RC Primary School
- Salisbury Road Primary School
- Shakespeare Primary School
- Stoke Damerel Primary School
- Stuart Road Primary School
- Thornbury Primary School
- Tor Bridge Primary School
- Victoria Road Primary
- Weston Mill Community Primary Academy
- Whitleigh Community Primary School
- Widewell Primary Academy
- Widey Court Primary School
- Woodfield Primary School
- Woodford Primary School
- Yealmpstone Farm Primary School

=== Non-selective secondary schools ===
- All Saints Church of England Academy
- Coombe Dean School
- Eggbuckland Community College
- Hele's School
- Lipson Co-operative Academy
- Marine Academy Plymouth
- Millbay Academy
- Notre Dame Catholic School
- Plympton Academy
- Plymstock School
- St Boniface's Catholic College
- Scott Medical and Healthcare College
- Sir John Hunt Community Sports College
- Stoke Damerel Community College
- Tor Bridge High
- UTC Plymouth

=== Grammar schools ===
- Devonport High School for Boys
- Devonport High School for Girls
- Plymouth High School for Girls

=== Special and alternative schools ===
- ACE Schools
- Brook Green Centre for Learning
- Cann Bridge School
- Courtlands School
- Longcause Community Special School
- Mill Ford School
- Mount Tamar School
- Woodlands School

=== Further education ===
- City College Plymouth
- Plymouth College of Art

== Independent schools ==
=== Primary and preparatory schools ===
- Fletewood School
- King's School

=== Senior and all-through schools ===
- OneSchool Global UK
- Plymouth College

=== Special and alternative schools ===
- Chapel Bridge School
