= Ready to Learn =

Behaviour policy in some British schools

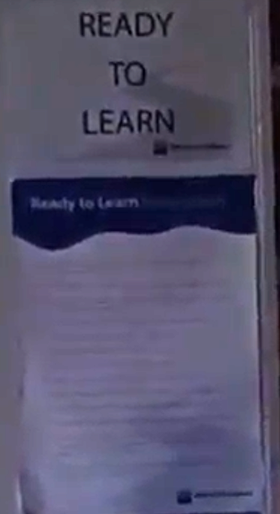
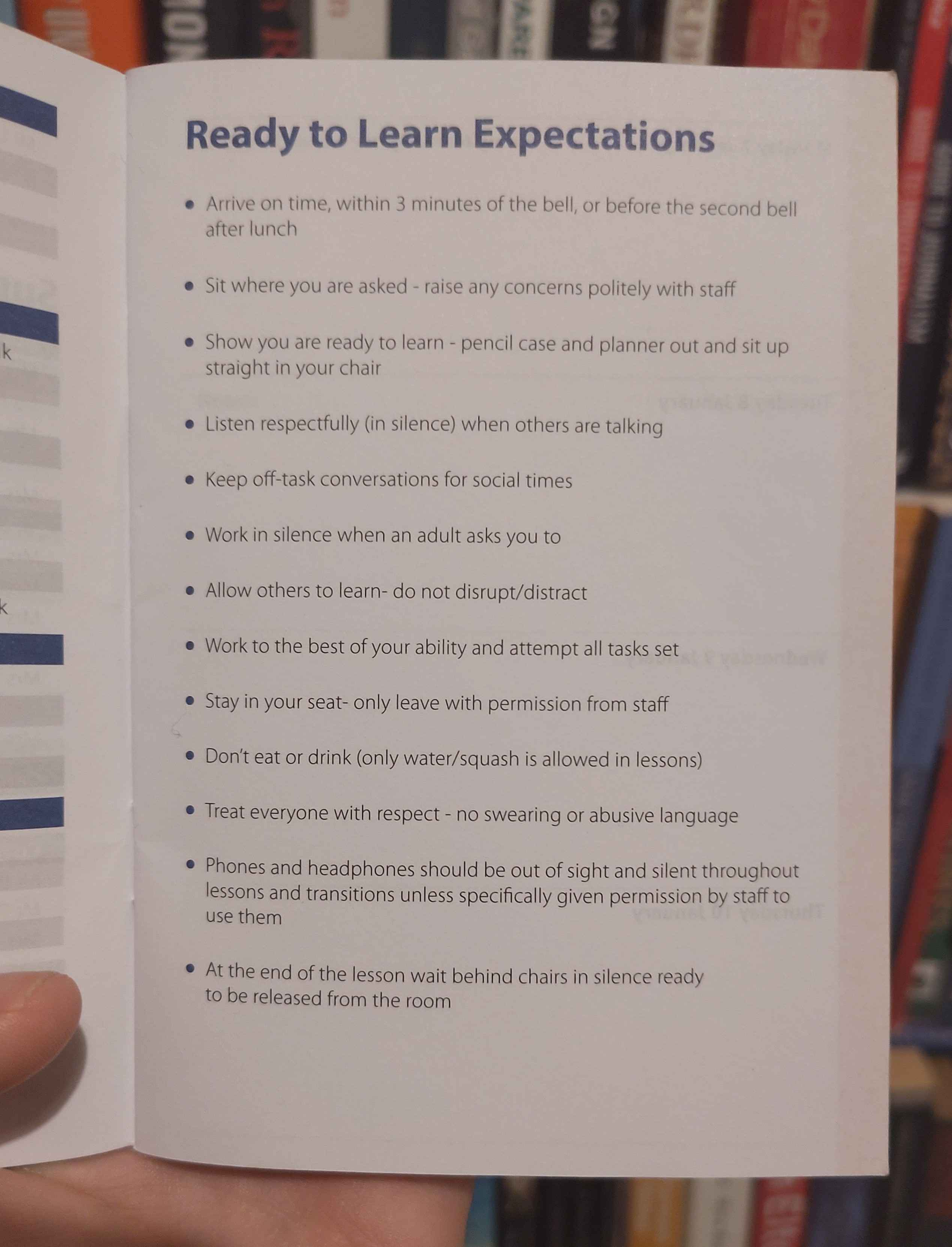
Ready to Learn expections on a classroom poster and printed in a student planner at West Exe School, Exeter in 2018.

Ready to Learn (RTL) is a zero-tolerance behaviour policy template used in some British secondary schools. Under RTL, students receive a warning for any minor infraction; on committing a second minor infraction, they are sent to an "isolation" room for five lessons (looping around to the next day if necessary) and a one-hour detention after school. This is described as an "extremely simple, binary system".

Ready to Learn was developed by Henbury School in Bristol in 2016. It has since been adopted by many other academies nationally. Some schools have implemented RTL under alternative names, making it challenging to estimate the extent of its usage. (Note: For example, the Ted Wragg Multi-Academy Trust in Exeter introduced Ready to Learn policies under their original name in 2017, but rebranded them as "Reset" in 2020 without a substantive change in content (see: Stapleton, p. 10) and by October 2024, a parents' campaign group named after the rebranded policy, Reset Ted Wragg (see: Merritt, Anita (4 April 2023). "Frustrated parents demand Ted Wragg Trust make six urgent changes to school policy". Devon Live.) reported further changes to the nomenclature of "Reset / RTL" (which they considered a "disingenuous" attempt to conceal the nature of the system). See Reset Ted Wragg)

== History ==
Ready to Learn was created at Henbury School, Bristol in January 2016. Headteacher Clare Bradford and assistant headteacher Matthew Stevenson have both claimed sole responsibility. Conservative MP Charlotte Leslie praised the system, and invited former Labour schools minister Jim Knight to tour the school, resulting in Knight also evaluating the system favourably. Ofsted subsequently assessed in November 2018 that school leaders' "attention to the implementation of the school's behaviour strategy, 'ready to learn', has diverted their attention from tackling the school's sharp and severe decline in pupils' academic performance", and rated the school Inadequate.

Journalist Michal Grant has called RTL a "symptom of school leaders not seeing children as complex young people", Stevenson himself cited a training course at the Ambition Institute and a fact-finding mission to other schools as the inspirations for the policy.

Local press cited the introduction of Ready to Learn to West Exe School, Exeter in 2017 as the reason for the school's improvement in results. The Ted Wragg Multi-Academy Trust had also introduced RTL to other schools in Exeter, including Isca Academy. In April 2023, a parents' campaign group opposed the punishment policy. The Trust initially agreed to review its policies, but the group dismissed the proposed amendments to the RTL system as inadequate. As of September 2024, the group remains active, accusing the Trust of "doubling-down on outdated and unpleasant" policies.

The fifth episode of School (2018), a BBC Two documentary, focuses on the introduction of Ready to Learn to the Castle School Education Trust in South Gloucestershire. The programme describes RTL as "strict" and frames it as a cost-saving substitute for more expensive bespoke measures for children with complex needs. A senior leader at Marlwood School concedes that RTL is unfair on students with complex needs. When headteachers raise concerns about RTL's fairness, the trust's CEO encourages them to "hold our nerve" in enforcing it, saying that he would "rather have the problem" of a minority of students missing lessons than see lessons be disrupted.

Bristol City Council's independent review into alternative learning provision in 2020 found that most Bristol secondary schools were using Ready to Learn or a similar policy. The report states that there "appears to be an evidence base that says 'Ready to Learn' is an effective whole school behaviour approach and some schools have described it in positive terms as 'transformational'", but also that RTL results in disproportionate numbers of pupils with additional needs being excluded and put into alternative provision.

== Variants and alternative names ==
Some schools have implemented but renamed RTL. The exact wording of policy documents often confirms the derivation from vanilla RTL. The vanilla policy document includes a list of four "aims" of RTL with the incipit "To eliminate disruptive behaviour". This stock rationale not only appears word for word in many policies which retain the Ready to Learn title, but in policies with different names, such as Kingswinford Academy's "Prepared for Excellence" policy. "Prepared for Excellence" is mechanically identical to RTL in that students are sent to isolation for 24 hours after one warning; there are immediate detentions for breaching lunchtime rules; etc. (its name also appears to be a sort of calque: "prepared" for "ready", etc.). Whilst this alone could still be a coincidence, the word-for-word presence of the "To eliminate disruptive behaviour" rationale text confirms that the policy must indeed have been copied from RTL.

In other cases, local knowledge can trace a policy back to RTL. For instance, in 2022–23, All Saints Church of England Academy, Plymouth had a behaviour policy where students would be sent to isolation on their third (not their second) warning, and only initially for the rest of that lesson and a detention; it was only repeat offenders that were sent for 24 hours. Isolation was known as 'the Lighthouse'. Based on the policy alone, All Saints' way of using the Lighthouse would not necessarily seem to derive from Ready to Learn. However, it is known from the local press that All Saints introduced RTL under its original name in 2017.

== Usage ==
In addition to being used at "most Bristol secondary schools", RTL is used at a number of other schools elsewhere in Britain.

=== Vanilla RTL ===
- SBL Academy (South Gloucestershire)
- John Frost School (Newport South Wales)
- Bishop Fox's School (Somerset)
- Teign School (Devon)
- Brannel School (Cornwall) (Note: Refers to isolation as the "Ready to Learn room", but is otherwise completely vanilla, down to the exact wording of the rationale, etc.)

=== Variant forms using RTL name ===
- St Ninian's High School (Isle of Man): The policy is called Ready to Learn and uses standardised wording, but students are sent to isolation only on the third warning.
- Fallibroome Academy (Cheshire): The policy is called Ready to Learn but the system has been made more complex, e.g. introducing variable-length isolations and 'Yellow Cards' below Red Cards.
- Nether Stowe School (Staffordshire): Semantically, "Ready to Learn" is used as the name of the isolation infrastructure, not the behaviour policy; students also get an additional warning.
- The Axholme Academy (North Lincolnshire)
- Casterton College (Rutland)
- Bow School (London)
- Hanley Castle High School (Worcestershire)

=== RTL under alternative names ===
- West Exe School (Exeter) (Note: See above.)
- St James School (Exeter)
- ISCA Academy (Exeter)
- All Saints Academy (Plymouth)
- Kingswinford Academy (West Midlands)
