= Estover (disambiguation) =

Estover may refer to:

- Estovers, an English legal term
- Estover, Plymouth, a housing estate in Devon, England
- Tor Bridge High, formerly Estover Community College, Devon, England
