= Plymouth Moor View =

UK Parliament constituency (since 2010)

Coordinates: 50.411°N 4.14°W

- Borough constituency for the House of Commons
- Interactive map of boundaries since 2024
- Boundary of Plymouth Moor View in South West England
- County: Devon
- Electorate: 73,378 (2023)
- Major settlements: Plymouth

Current constituency
- Created: 2010
- Member of Parliament: Fred Thomas (Labour)
- Seats: One
- Created from: Plymouth Devonport, Plymouth Sutton

Plymouth Moor View is a constituency represented in the House of Commons of the Parliament of the United Kingdom. It elects one Member of Parliament (MP) by the first past the post system of election and has been represented since 2024 by Fred Thomas of the Labour Party. He defeated the incumbent Conservative MP, Johnny Mercer, who had been first elected in 2015.

The seat was created for the 2010 general election and is largely the successor to the former Plymouth Devonport constituency.

== Constituency profile ==
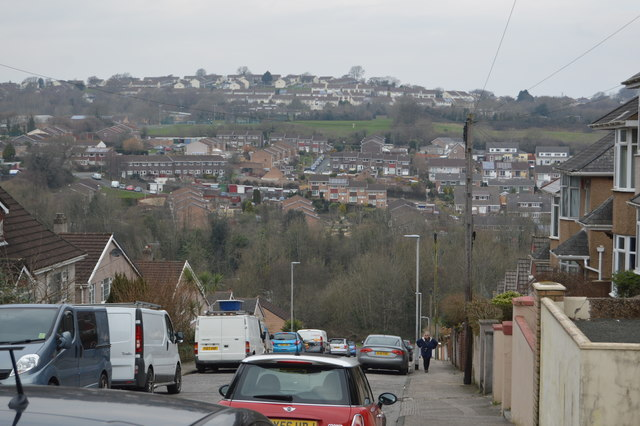
The suburb of Eggbuckland

Plymouth Moor View is a constituency in Devon in South West England. It covers the outer, northern suburbs of the city of Plymouth, including St Budeaux, North Prospect, Manadon, Crownhill, Eggbuckland, Leigham, Estover, Southway, Tamerton Foliot, Whitleigh and Ernesettle.

Plymouth is a port city with a maritime history. Its importance as a naval base and centre for shipbuilding made it a target for the Luftwaffe during World War II and much of the city was destroyed in the Plymouth Blitz. As a result, the city underwent significant redevelopment after the war. Most of this constituency consisted of rural villages until they were absorbed by the city's post-war suburban expansion. The constituency's eastern neighbourhoods like Crownhill and Southway are generally affluent with many detached houses, whilst the western neighbourhoods like Whitleigh and St Budeaux are highly-deprived with most residents living in dense semi-detached or terraced housing. House prices across the constituency are considerably lower than the regional and UK averages.

Residents of Plymouth Moor View have a similar age profile to the rest of the country. They have low levels of income and average rates of homeownership. The child poverty rate is above-average. Residents have low levels of education and a high proportion work in the health sector, many at the large Derriford Hospital near Estover. The percentage claiming unemployment benefits is below-average. White people made up 96% of the population at the 2021 census.

At the local city council, most of this constituency is represented by the Labour Party with some Reform UK councillors elected at the most recent election. Voters in Plymouth Moor View strongly supported leaving the European Union in the 2016 referendum; an estimated 67% voted in favour of Brexit compared to the UK-wide rate of 52%.

== Boundaries ==
Map of boundaries from 2010 to 2024

=== 2010–2024 ===
The City of Plymouth wards of:

- Budshead, Eggbuckland, Ham, Honicknowle, Moor View, St Budeaux and Southway.

=== 2024–present ===
As above plus polling districts KC and KD of Peverell ward.

Further to the 2023 periodic review of Westminster constituencies which came into effect for the 2024 general election, the composition of the constituency was expanded slightly in order to bring the electorate within the permitted range by transferring north-western parts of Peverell ward from Plymouth Sutton and Devonport.

The remaining wards from the City of Plymouth are in the constituencies of Plymouth Sutton and Devonport and South West Devon.

== Members of Parliament ==
Election	Member	Party
2010	Alison Seabeck	Labour
2015	Johnny Mercer	Conservative
2024	Fred Thomas	Labour

== Elections ==
=== Elections in the 2020s ===
General election 2024: Plymouth Moor View
Party	Candidate	Votes	%	±%
Labour	Fred Thomas	17,665	41.2	+8.9
Conservative	Johnny Mercer	12,061	28.1	–31.7
Reform	Shaun Hooper	9,670	22.6	+22.4
Liberal Democrats	Sarah Martin	1,766	4.1	–0.9
Green	Georgia Nelson	1,694	4.0	+1.4
Majority		5,604	13.1	N/A
Turnout		42,856	57.4	–8.2
Registered electors		74,724		
Labour gain from Conservative		Swing	▲20.8	

=== Elections in the 2010s ===
2019 notional result
Party	Vote	%
Conservative	28,810	59.8
Labour	15,548	32.3
Liberal Democrats	2,430	5.0
Green	1,254	2.6
Brexit Party	110	0.2
Turnout	48,152	65.6
Electorate	73,378	

General election 2019: Plymouth Moor View
Party	Candidate	Votes	%	±%
Conservative	Johnny Mercer	26,831	60.7	+8.8
Labour Co-op	Charlotte Holloway	13,934	31.5	–9.3
Liberal Democrats	Sarah Martin	2,301	5.2	+3.2
Green	Ewan Flavell	1,173	2.7	+1.5
Majority		12,897	29.2	+18.1
Turnout		44,239	63.7	–1.8
Registered electors		69,430		
Conservative hold		Swing	+9.1	

General election 2017: Plymouth Moor View
Party	Candidate	Votes	%	±%
Conservative	Johnny Mercer	23,567	51.9	+14.3
Labour	Sue Dann	18,548	40.8	+5.6
UKIP	Wendy Noble	1,849	4.1	–17.4
Liberal Democrats	Graham Reed	917	2.0	–1.0
Green	Josh Pope	536	1.2	–1.2
Majority		5,019	11.1	+8.7
Turnout		45,417	65.5	+3.9
Conservative hold		Swing	+4.4	

General election 2015: Plymouth Moor View
Party	Candidate	Votes	%	±%
Conservative	Johnny Mercer	16,020	37.6	+4.3
Labour	Alison Seabeck	14,994	35.2	–2.0
UKIP	Penny Mills	9,152	21.5	+13.8
Liberal Democrats	Stuart Bonar	1,265	3.0	–13.9
Green	Benjamin Osborn	1,023	2.4	+1.4
TUSC	Louise Parker	152	0.4	New
Majority		1,026	2.4	N/A
Turnout		42,606	61.6	–0.1
Conservative gain from Labour		Swing	+3.2	

General election 2010: Plymouth Moor View
Party	Candidate	Votes	%	±%
Labour	Alison Seabeck	15,433	37.2	
Conservative	Matthew Groves	13,845	33.3	
Liberal Democrats	Stuart Bonar	7,016	16.9	
UKIP	Bill Wakeham	3,188	7.7	
BNP	Roy Cook	1,438	3.5	
Green	Wendy Miller	398	1.0	
Socialist Labour	David Marchesi	208	0.5	
Majority		1,588	3.9	
Turnout		41,526	61.7	
Labour win (new seat)				

== See also ==
- List of parliamentary constituencies in Devon
