= HDR =

HDR or hdr may refer to:

== Businesses ==
- HDR, Inc., an American design firm
- HevyDevy Records, a Canadian music label
- High Dive Records, an American music label

== Technology ==
- Hard disk recorder, a system that uses a high-capacity hard disk to record digital audio or digital video
- HD Radio, in audio broadcasting
- High dynamic range, an enhanced signal representation in images, videos, audio, or radio
  - High-dynamic-range rendering, in computer graphics
  - High-dynamic-range imaging, in photography
  - High-dynamic-range video, in television

== Science ==
- Homology directed repair, of cellular DNA
- Hot dry rock, a geothermal energy source
- GATA3 (or HDR), a protein and gene

== Transport ==
- Hyderabad Junction railway station, Sindh, Pakistan
- Hadrian Road Metro station, Tyneside, England

== Other uses ==
- Habilitation à diriger des recherches, a post-doctoral academic degree in some French-speaking countries
- Honicknowle Defence Regiment, a 2000s criminal gang from Plymouth, England
- Human Development Report, an annual United Nations publication
- Humanitarian daily ration, an air-dropped food ration for disasters

== See also ==
- HDRS
- Header (disambiguation)
- High Data Rate (disambiguation)
