= Honicknowle =

Suburb of Plymouth, Devon

Coordinates: 50.410833°N 4.167222°W

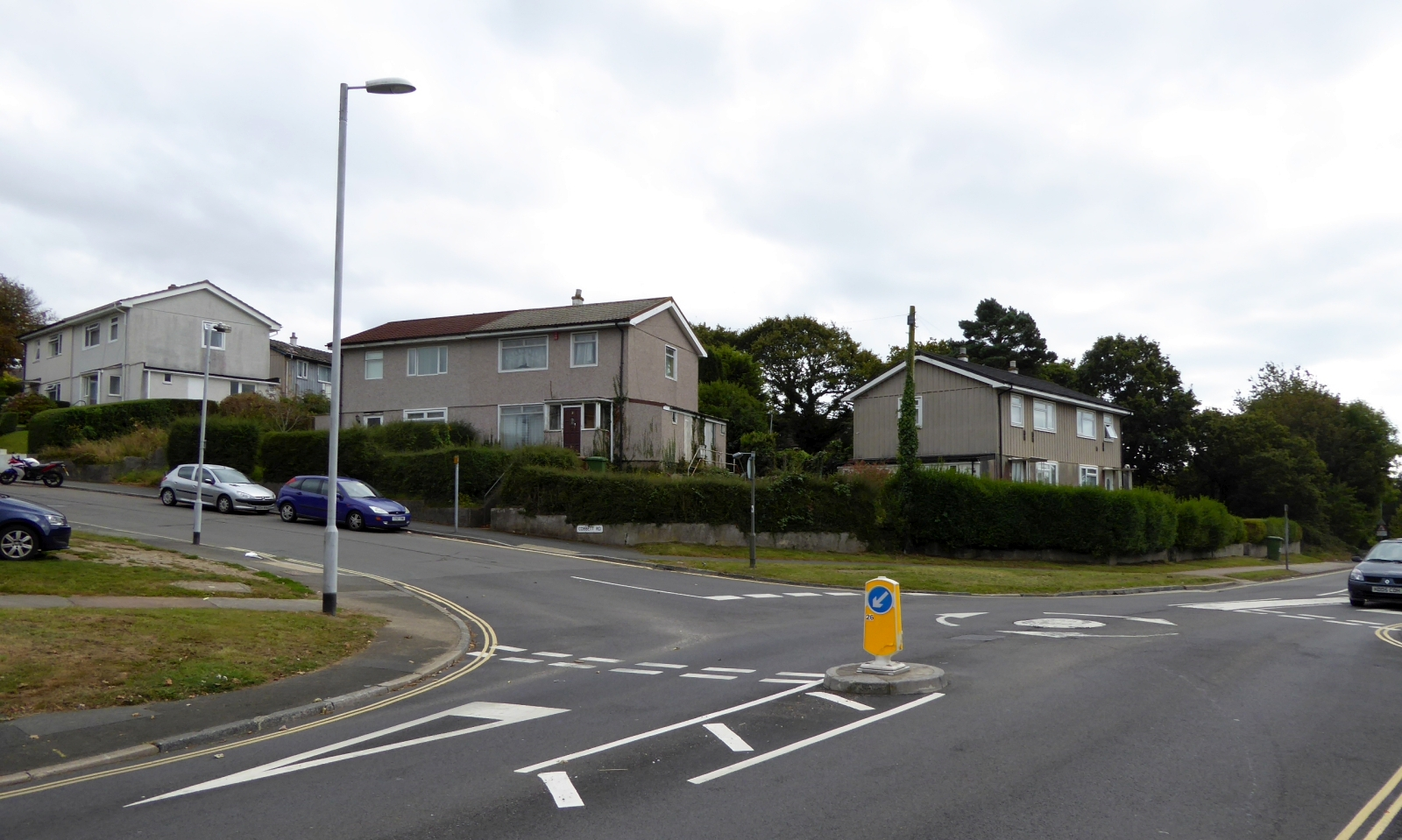
- The end of Cobbett Road, Honicknowle

- Location within Devon
- Unitary authority: Plymouth
- Ceremonial county: Devon
- Region: South West
- Country: England
- Sovereign state: United Kingdom
- Post town: PLYMOUTH
- Postcode district: PL5 xxx
- Dialling code: 01752
- Police: Devon and Cornwall
- Fire: Devon and Somerset
- Ambulance: South Western
- UK Parliament: Plymouth Moor View

Honicknowle is an area and ward of the city of Plymouth in the English county of Devon. It borders with West Park, Crownhill, Ham, Whitleigh and Pennycross areas of Plymouth. It was previously part of Knackersknowle.

== General ==
The UK Census of 2001 revealed that the population stood at 9,802, although that number has likely increased significantly along with the growth of the city, of which 47.2 per cent were male and 52.8 per cent were female. (Information provided by The City of Plymouth website/Devon and Cornwall police) The 2011 census showed the ward population as 13,939.

== Education ==
=== Primary schools ===
- Knowle Primary, West Park and Chaucer Primary Schools
- 2009 - Knowle Primary and Shakespeare Primary (Amalgamation of West Park and Chaucer Primaries, relocated in the new building on Butt Park Playing Fields).

=== Secondary school ===
Honicknowle County Secondary Modern School 1952 - about 1989,[demolished].

- John Kitto Community College now renamed as All Saints Church of England Academy Plymouth.

== Commerce ==
There is a small shopping complex located at Honicknowle Green, which serves the local community with basic amenities.

Honicknowle is also within the catchment of both West Park and Crownhill shopping precincts.

== Criminal activities ==
Honicknowle had quite a notorious gang culture in the mid 2000s. On 18 April 2009, an Anti Social Behaviour Order (ASBO) was served to several senior members of the Honicknowle Defence Regiment, which was at a time one of the biggest criminal organizations in the United Kingdom, banning them from associating together until 19 May 2009. The de facto leader of the organization was also tried and given a prison sentence. However, in recent years Honicknowle has, surprisingly, had quite a low rate of crime.

== Religion ==
As with most of the city of Plymouth, the majority of Honicknowle's residents identify as Christian.

St. Francis of Assisi church located off Little Dock Lane is closest to Honicknowle Green. There is also a thriving Methodist Church. There is A Church of England Chapel located at St Budeaux roundabout which is a part of the Honicknowle Boundary

There is also a Jehovah's Witnesses hall located in Transit Way.

== Places of interest ==
There are Pubs and Social Clubs located at Farm Lane and Crownhill Road. Honicknowle Green celebrated November 5 or Guy Fawkes night with a traditional bonfire and large fireworks display, most of this display was organised and funded by local citizens. However, due to new local restrictions and regulations, there is no longer an annual bonfire.

== Politics ==
Honicknowle is part of the Plymouth Devonport constituency, which is subject to boundary changes for the 2009/2010 general election. They are thus: northern parts, including St. Budeaux, of the current constituency will become Plymouth Moor View and the rest will join with parts of Plymouth Sutton to form Plymouth Sutton and Devonport.
