= Leigham =

Suburb of Plymouth, Devon, England

Coordinates: 50.403°N 4.093°W

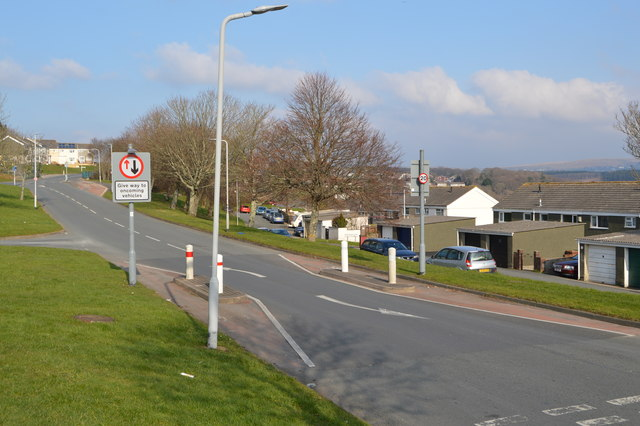
- Bampton Road

- Location within Devon
- Unitary authority: Plymouth
- Ceremonial county: Devon
- Region: South West
- Country: England
- Sovereign state: United Kingdom
- Post town: Plymouth
- Postcode district: PL6
- Dialling code: 01752
- Police: Devon and Cornwall
- Fire: Devon and Somerset
- Ambulance: South Western
- UK Parliament: Plymouth Moor View

Leigham is the name of an area of the city of Plymouth in the English county of Devon.

Originally a hamlet and manor separate from the city, urban expansion of the 20th century has meant that the area has become widely built up. The area is located to the north east of Plymouth itself.

The place name is Anglo Saxon in origin, and means 'an open space in a wood'. In the Domesday Book of 1086 it was referred to as Leaham and was recorded as consisting of the manor and two farms.

The ancient manor house is no longer there: it fell into disrepair following the Second World War. In the late summer of 1946, Plymouth City Council bought the Leigham Manor Estate as part of its redevelopment plan for the city.

Leigham was in the parish of Plympton St Mary but is now in the parish of Estover, which itself was carved out of the manorial estate in the 1970s.
