= High dynamic range (disambiguation) =

High dynamic range (HDR) may refer to:

- High dynamic range, a general term describing dynamic range across multiple fields
- High-dynamic-range video, a technology related to HDR displays and formats such as HDR10, Dolby Vision, HDR10+, and others.
- High-dynamic-range rendering, techniques in computer-generated imagery
- Multi-exposure HDR capture, a technique for capturing high dynamic range images and videos

== See also ==
- Dynamic range
- HDR (disambiguation)
- Standard-dynamic-range video
- Wide dynamic range
