= Kate Nesbitt =

English Naval pharmacy technician

- Born: 21 April 1988 (age 38); Plymouth, England
- Military career
- Allegiance: United Kingdom
- Branch: Royal Navy
- Service years: 2005–present
- Rank: Chief Petty Officer
- Unit: HMNB Devonport
- Conflicts: War in Afghanistan
- Awards: Military Cross

Kate Louise Nesbitt MC (born 21 April 1988) is a pharmacy technician in the Royal Navy. Nesbitt was the first female member of the Royal Navy, and the second woman in the British Armed Forces, to be awarded the Military Cross (MC). The award was a result of her actions in Afghanistan in March 2009.

== Personal life ==
Nesbitt is from Whitleigh in Plymouth, Devon and was educated at Sir John Hunt Community College in Whitleigh. Her father Clive Nesbitt is a former Royal Marine colour sergeant who served for 22 years, and two of her brothers are also in the armed forces. She is 5 ft 0 in (1.52 m) tall.

== Military career ==
Nesbitt joined the Royal Navy in 2005. She passed a Military Prehospital Emergency Care course run by the charity British Association for Immediate Care (BASICS) at the Royal Marines base in Arbroath in Scotland. After medical training, she served at the Commando Training Centre in Lympstone, followed by a posting aboard the Type 42 destroyer HMS Nottingham.

Nesbitt was deployed to Afghanistan for six months between October 2008 and March 2009 as part of the ongoing Operation Herrick, the British contribution to the War in Afghanistan which began in 2001. With the rank of Able Seaman Class 1, Nesbitt was a Medical Assistant attached to 3 Commando Brigade, working in close support of C Company, 1st Battalion The Rifles (1 RIFLES). (The Royal Navy provides the medical support to 3 Commando Brigade, who are normally based in Plymouth.)

On her return from Afghanistan, Nesbitt worked in the Surgical Assessment Unit at the Military Hospital Unit in Derriford Hospital, Plymouth. (MDHU Derriford)

Nesbitt qualified as a Naval pharmacy technician in January 2015 and transferred to the Medical Technician branch in April 2017.

== Military Cross ==
=== Medal ===
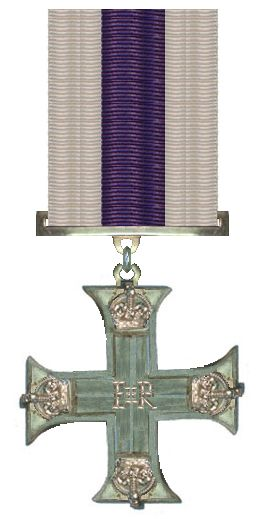
The Military Cross

The Military Cross is awarded to any rank of the Army, Navy, Marines and Air Force "in recognition of exemplary gallantry during active operations against the enemy on land". For her performance in the Afghanistan tour, including during an ambush on 12 March 2009, Nesbitt (then aged 21) became the first female member of the Royal Navy, and the second woman in the British Armed Forces, to be awarded the Military Cross (MC), after Private Michelle Norris of the Royal Army Medical Corps, who received the MC for action in Iraq in 2006.

=== Taliban ambush ===
The primary action for which Nesbitt received the Military Cross was for acts during a Taliban ambush. On 12 March 2009, while under fire from Taliban forces, Nesbitt administered emergency medical treatment which saved the life of Lance Corporal John List, a 22-year-old soldier of 1st Battalion, The Rifles (1 RIFLES), from Holsworthy, Devon.

On that day, List's unit was undertaking a five-day operation in Marjah district, Helmand Province, securing the area for the forthcoming Afghan elections. In the mid-afternoon, during a Taliban ambush and ensuing gun-battle, List was shot in the neck. Nesbitt, on being informed by radio of a "man down" and the location, ran 60 to 70 metres under fire and found List struggling to breathe, as the bullet had gone through his top lip, ruptured his jaw and come out of his neck. She administered aid for around 45 minutes, stemming the blood loss, and providing him with another airway. During treatment they were subject to gun and rocket fire from the Taliban forces. List was later airlifted to hospital by Merlin helicopter.

Nesbitt returned from Afghanistan three weeks after the ambush, at the end of her tour. Nesbitt next met List back in England in May 2009, at a medals parade for 1 RIFLES at their Chepstow barracks, the first time he was able to speak, and thank Nesbitt.

=== Award ===
Nesbitt's award was first announced on 11 September 2009. Both List and Nesbitt attended the Devon Festival of Remembrance at the University of Exeter on 5 November 2009. Nesbitt also read the citation during the Royal British Legion's Festival of Remembrance in the Royal Albert Hall in London on Saturday 7 November 2009.

Nesbitt was presented with her Military Cross by Prince Charles on 27 November 2009 at Buckingham Palace. Nesbitt's citation read:

Nesbitt's actions throughout a series of offensive operations were exemplary; under fire and under pressure her commitment and courage were inspirational and made the difference between life and death. She performed in the highest traditions of her service.

== Honours and awards ==

Ribbon	Description	Notes
	Military Cross (MC)	November 2009
	Operational Service Medal for Afghanistan	With "AFGHANISTAN" Clasp
	Queen Elizabeth II Diamond Jubilee Medal	2012; UK Version of this Medal
	Queen Elizabeth II Platinum Jubilee Medal	2022; UK Version of this Medal
	King Charles III Coronation Medal	2023; UK Version of this Medal
	Naval Long Service and Good Conduct Medal	15 Years of Service in the Royal Navy

- She won the award for "Most Outstanding Sailor or Marine" at The Sun Military Awards on 21 December 2009.

== See also ==
- Helmand province campaign
- List of British gallantry awards for the War in Afghanistan
- List of people from Plymouth
- Royal Navy Medical Branch
- Women in the military
