= Whitleigh =

Area of Plymouth, Devon, England

Coordinates: 50°25′07″N 4°09′02″W

Whitleigh is a district area and is in the electoral ward of Budshead in the city of Plymouth in the county of Devon. it had district borders with Southway, Honicknowle, West park, Crownhill and St Budeaux. Whitleigh has a population of 7870 (2017)

== Education ==
Whitleigh's primary schools are Woodfield Primary School, St. Peter's Roman Catholic School, Whitleigh Community Primary School, and Woodland Community Special School. Sir John Hunt Community Sports College (formerly Community College, and previously Whitleigh comprehensive (or High) school) previously merged with Southway Community College due to budget cuts from the local government.

Whitleigh also houses the Woodside Education Centre. This institute is aimed at children with learning or serious physical disabilities. Children from 4 to 16 years of age are accepted.

=== Wood View Learning Community ===
Wood View Learning Community, is a new campus-styled community facility, that opened in 2010. It stands at the site of the previous school buildings on Lancaster Gardens. The site homes Sir John Hunt Community Sports College, Whitleigh Community Primary School and Woodlands Special School, as well other community services such as the Youth Centre. The aim of the campus, run by a federated Governing Body, is to bring together three schools to work together, and offer a high-quality education too all its students, and to act as a real hub within the community.

=== Sir John Hunt Community Sports College ===
Sir John Hunt Community Sports College is the local secondary school that caters for all students aged 11 to 19. It is a relatively smaller school in comparison to others in the city, but can offer some of the best facilities now being part of the Wood View Campus. The college opened it first provisions for post-16 education, in the form of a Sixth Form in 2010, and is the last school in Plymouth to open a sixth form. The sixth form works in a consortium with Lipson Co-operative Academy and Tor Bridge High, where students from all three schools have the opportunity to study level 3 courses across the consortium.

== Religion ==
The suburb has three churches. St Chad's Anglican church, Bethany Evangelical Church and a Salvation Army church and centre in Lancaster Gardens.

Recently, what was formerly the Whitleigh Christian Centre has now been re-opened as Engage Whitleigh. Engage Whitleigh is a Pentecostal church in fellowship with the Assemblies of God which is able to provide community-based conferencing facilities.

== Fownes family ==
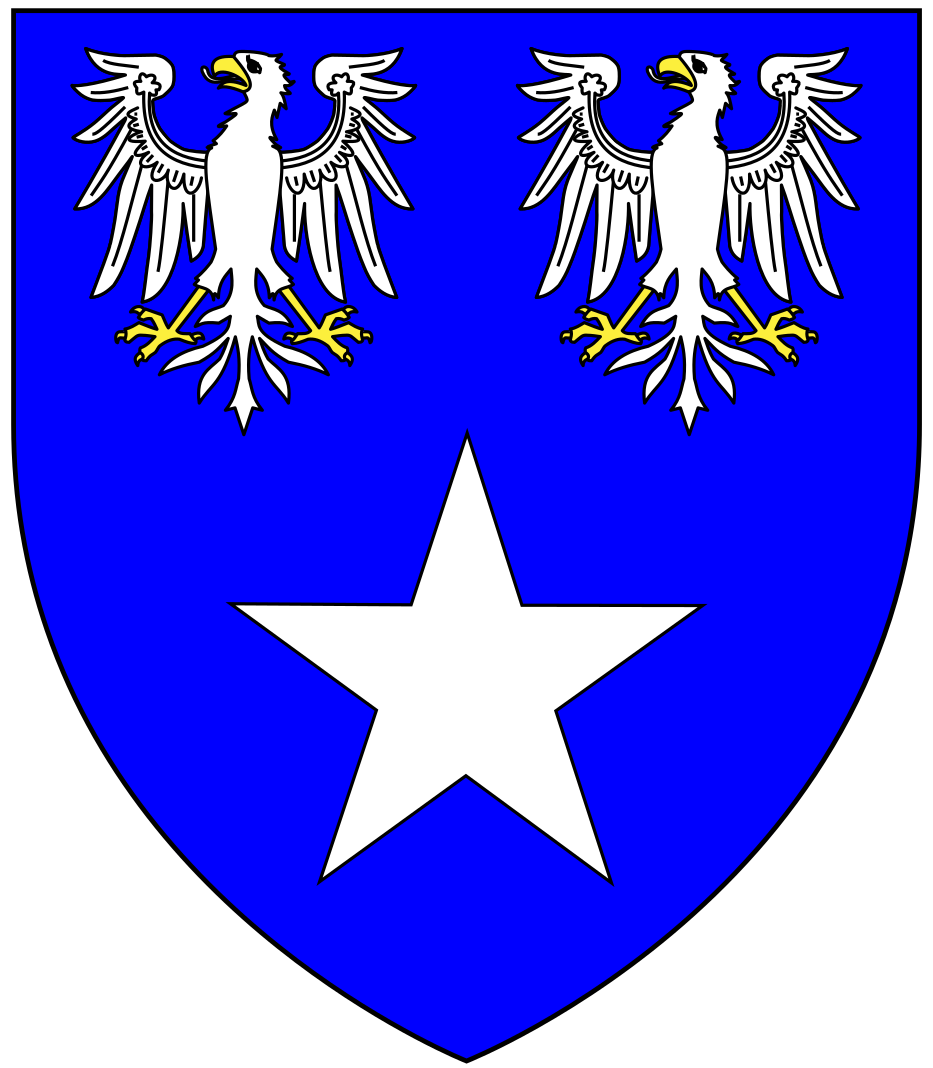
Arms of Fownes of Plymouth, Kittery Court & Nethway, in Devon & Dunster Castle in Somerset: Azure, two eagles displayed in chief and a mullet in base argent. Following the marriage and inheritance of Dunster Castle they adopted the arms of Luttrell and quartered their paternal arms.

Whitley was a seat of the Fownes family from the 17th century. John Fownes (1614–1646) of Whitley was the fourth son of Thomas Fownes (d. 1638) of Plymouth, Mayor of Plymouth in 1619. He married Catherine Champernowne (d. 1642/3), fifth daughter of Arthur Champernowne of Dartington. His son was John Fownes (1640–1670) of Whitley, who married Mary Northleigh (d. 1669), a daughter of Henry Northleigh (1612–1675) of Peamore, Exminster by his wife Lettice Yarde, daughter of Edward Yarde of Bradley, Devon. Their monument survives in St Budeaux Church inscribed as follows:

"In memorie of John Fownes of Whitley Esq: and of Mary his wife Daughter of Henry Northleigh of Peamore Esq: He dyed the 22nd day of Aprill 1670 ætatis 30, She dyed the 18th day of Aprill 1669 ætatis 28 Also Elizabeth their daughter dyed the 31 day of March 1669, Leavinge survivinge children John. Henry Katherine and Mary".

Their eldest son and heir was John Fownes (1661–1731) of Kittery Court, a Member of Parliament for Dartmouth 1713–14. His grandson was Henry Fownes Luttrell (1722–1780) (who adopted the additional surname of Luttrell) of Dunster Castle, Somerset, High Sheriff of Somerset from 1754 to 1755, and a Member of Parliament for the borough of Minehead from 1768 to 1774.

== Wheal Whitleigh ==
Wheal Whitleigh was a silver and lead mine, located near the present-day Christian Mill Business park. Workings extend westwards following the approximate line of Lancaster gardens.
