= Alison Seabeck =

British politician (born 1954)

Member of Parliament for Plymouth Moor View Plymouth Devonport (2005–2010)
- In office 5 May 2005 – 30 March 2015
- Preceded by: David Jamieson
- Succeeded by: Johnny Mercer

Shadow Minister for Defence
- In office 7 October 2011 – 8 May 2015
- Leader: Ed Miliband

Personal details
- Born: 20 January 1954 (age 72) Dagenham, Essex, England
- Party: Labour
- Spouses: Denis Seabeck (m. 1975, divorced) Nick Raynsford (m. 2012)
- Children: 2 daughters
- Education: North East London Polytechnic
- Website: http://alisonseabeck.org.uk

Alison Jane Seabeck (née Ward, 20 January 1954) is a British former politician. A member of the Labour Party, she served as the Member of Parliament (MP) for Plymouth Devonport from 2005 until 2010 and for Plymouth Moor View from 2010 to 2015, when she was defeated by Johnny Mercer of the Conservative Party. In Government she was a Whip 2007–2008. In opposition, Seabeck was a shadow Housing and Defence Minister.

== Early life ==
Before her marriage, Seabeck was known as Alison Ward. She is the daughter of Michael Ward, a former Labour member of parliament for Peterborough, and was educated at the Harold Hill Grammar School in Harold Hill, Havering, London, and the North East London Polytechnic in Stratford (now the University of East London). Seabeck was a member of the MSF Union (now Unite), and while working as a researcher at the House of Commons became the secretary of the South Thames Community Branch. In 2005 she was also a member of the feminist Fawcett Society and the Labour Women's Network.

== Political career ==
In March 2005, Seabeck was selected from an all-women shortlist to stand for Labour in the Plymouth Devonport seat.

She was elected at the 2005 general election with a majority of 8,103, replacing David Jamieson. From 2007 to 2008 she served as a Government Whip attached to the Department for Business, Enterprise and Regulatory Reform. She chaired the South West Regional Select Committee between 2009 and 2010 and sat on the Local Government Select Committee and the Regulatory Reform Select Committee between 2005 and 2007. Between 2006 and 2007, and again from 2008 to 2009, she was Parliamentary Private Secretary to Geoff Hoon.

At the 2010 general election, Seabeck successfully held her seat in Plymouth Moor View. The Times Guide to the House of Commons 2010 described her as having a "very low profile".

On 11 October 2010, Seabeck was appointed Shadow Housing Minister, working with Caroline Flint, the then Shadow Secretary of State for Communities and Local Government. On 7 October 2011, she was appointed Shadow Defence Minister during Ed Miliband's reshuffle.

In December 2010, it was revealed that Seabeck was under investigation by the Parliamentary Commissioner for Standards in relation to declaration of member's interests. Seabeck was subsequently asked to apologise for speaking in a debate on fire safety without declaring that her partner, MP Nick Raynsford was a member of the Fire Protection Association.

She was also a member of the Public Bill Committee for the Defence Reform Act 2014

In 2014, she tried to introduce an exemption from the so-called 'bedroom tax' so that victims of domestic violence with a "panic room" installed were no longer penalised for the additional room.

At the 2015 general election, Seabeck again stood in Plymouth Moor View, but was defeated by the Conservative candidate Johnny Mercer.

== Personal life ==
Alison Ward married Denis G. Seabeck (deceased) in September 1975 in the London Borough of Havering. They have two daughters. On 5 October 2012, at the National Maritime Museum, she married Nick Raynsford, the Labour MP for Greenwich and Woolwich, for whom she had worked as a researcher before entering Parliament. They were reported to have been together for five years before marrying.

Parliament of the United Kingdom
Preceded by David Jamieson	Member of Parliament for Plymouth Devonport; 2005–2010	Constituency abolished
New constituency	Member of Parliament for Plymouth Moor View; 2010–2015	Succeeded by Johnny Mercer
