= Honicknowle Defence Regiment =

Honicknowle defence regiment
- Founded: 2003
- Founding location: Honicknowle, Plymouth
- Years active: 2003–2011
- Territory: Honicknowle, West Park, Whitleigh, Plymouth
- Ethnicity: White British
- Membership (est.): 50
- Criminal activities: assault, robbery, shoplifting, car jacking, arson, vandalism, among others.
- Notable members: Nathan Danvers

The Honicknowle Defence Regiment (HDR) was a mid-2000s criminal gang from Honicknowle, Plymouth. At one point they were dubbed one of the most feared gangs in the United Kingdom.

== History and founding ==
The HDR is thought to have first appeared in 2003. By 2004 the group had already committed hundreds of acts of vandalism around Honicknowle, as well as serious assault, robbery and sexual offences.

They met on a bridge to fight with a copycat group named The Whitleigh Mental Mafia.

== Disbanding ==
Between 2008 and 2009 many senior members of the group were charged after an effort by the police to disband the organization, which was reported to be becoming a more sophisticated crime syndicate. The leader, Nathan Danvers, was given a prison sentence in 2008 and others received non-custodial sentences, although many were later incarcerated for separate crimes. The last reported crime attributed to the HDR was in 2011.

== Legacy ==
No robbery was reported in the area over the whole of 2016.

The group is the first criminal organization from Plymouth to be reported about in a national newspaper, being featured in The Mirror and in The Daily Telegraph. The group also received coverage from the BBC.
