= Eggbuckland =

Suburb of Plymouth, Devon

Coordinates: 50.400556°N 4.113611°W

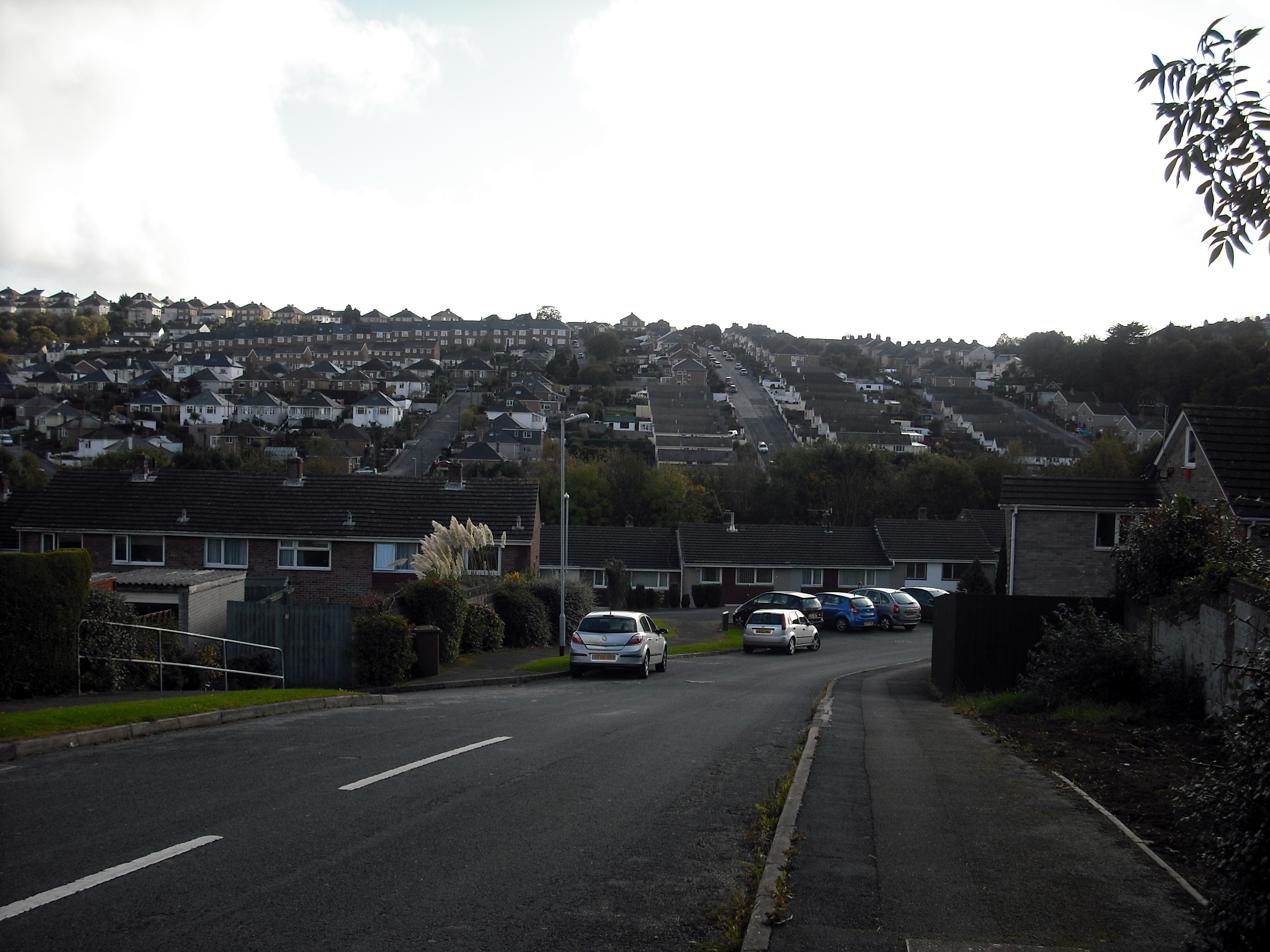
- Looking southwards beyond the A38 road

- Location within Devon
- Population: 13,351 (2011)
- Unitary authority: Plymouth
- Ceremonial county: Devon
- Region: South West
- Country: England
- Sovereign state: United Kingdom
- Post town: PLYMOUTH
- Postcode district: PL6 5xx
- Dialling code: 01752
- Police: Devon and Cornwall
- Fire: Devon and Somerset
- Ambulance: South Western
- UK Parliament: Plymouth Moor View

Eggbuckland is a suburb of the city of Plymouth, in the ceremonial county of Devon, England. Before the Second World War Eggbuckland was a small village a few miles north of Plymouth. During the reconstruction of Plymouth many new suburbs were built and soon a new estate was built within one mile to the south east of Eggbuckland. During the 1970s the areas in between and surrounding the old village were all developed and the whole area is now referred to by the name Eggbuckland. The development of the A38 just south of Eggbuckland in the 1980s led to the area becoming very popular with commuters.

Bocheland is of Saxon origin and means "Royal land held by charter". The Domesday Book of 1086 recorded that this manor was held by the King, William of Normandy, but was granted to the Saxon Heche or Ecca, thus the land was known as Heche or Ecca's Bocheland. This was the site of a Saxon church which was replaced by the present church of St Edward in 1470. The village was held by the Royalist Cavaliers during the Civil War against the Parliamentarian Roundheads and was badly damaged.

During the 19th century the area was host to new Palmerston Forts built as part of a northern defense line around Plymouth. Much of the structures remain but are privately owned and used for differing purposes.

Over time the name has been corrupted and by 1685 was Egg Buckland. By 1902, it was one word - Eggbuckland although the older usage is still seen around the city.

In the 1870s, the original village was described thus in John Marius Wilson's Imperial Gazetteer of England and Wales:

EGG-BUCKLAND, or Buckland-Egg, a parish in Plympton-St. Mary district, Devon; on the Dartmoor railway, adjacent to the Tavistock railway, and near the river Plym, 3 miles NNE of Plymonth. It contains Crabtree hamlet, and part of Knackers-Knowle village; and its post town is Knackers-Knowle, Devon. Acres, with Laira-Green, 3, 304; of which 100 are water. Real property, £8, 933; of which £68 are in quarries, and £36 in railways. Pop., 1, 348. Houses, 272. The property is much subdivided. Widey Court here was the headquarters of Prince Maurice during his siege of Plymouth, and was visited by the king. The living is a vicarage in the diocese of Exeter. Value, £474.* Patron, the Lord Chancellor. The church is ancient: consists of nave, south aisle, and chancel, with a tower; and is in fair condition. Charities, £28.

In 1931 the civil parish of Egg Buckland had a population of 2494. On 1 April 1939 the parish was abolished and merged with Plymouth and Bickleigh.

The suburb is home to Eggbuckland Community College and several primary schools.
