= Eggbuckland Community College =

Location
- Westcott Close; Eggbuckland; Plymouth, Devon, PL6 5YB; England
- Coordinates: 50.39971°N 4.12273°W

Information
- Type: Academy
- Department for Education URN: 140104 Tables
- Ofsted: Reports
- Gender: Coeducational
- Website: www.eggbuckland.com

Eggbuckland Community College is a coeducational secondary school and sixth form with academy status, located in the Eggbuckland area of Plymouth, Devon, England. The school converted to academy status on 1 September 2013.

== Academic performance and inspections ==
As of 2023, the school's last inspection by Ofsted was in 2020, with an outcome of "requires improvement".

== See also ==
- List of schools in Plymouth
