= Johnny Mercer (politician) =

British politician (born 1981)

The Right Honourable Johnny Mercer
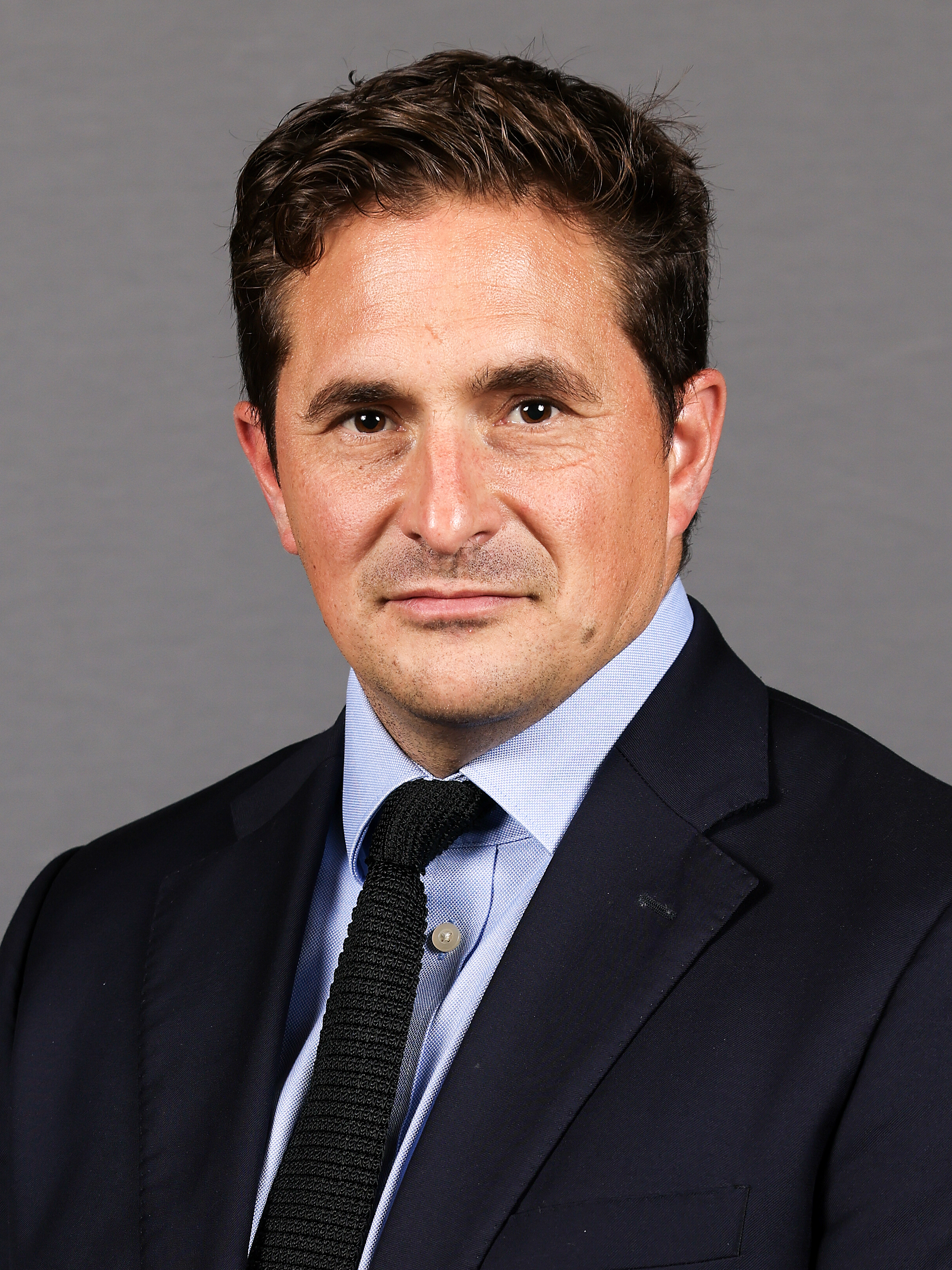
- Official portrait, 2022

Minister of State for Veterans' Affairs (Note: As Parliamentary Under-Secretary of State for Defence People and Veterans from July 2019 to April 2021; attended Cabinet from 2022)
- In office 25 October 2022 – 5 July 2024
- Prime Minister: Rishi Sunak
- Preceded by: James Heappey
- Succeeded by: Al Carns
- In office 7 July 2022 – 6 September 2022
- Prime Minister: Boris Johnson
- Preceded by: Leo Docherty
- Succeeded by: Sarah Atherton
- In office 28 July 2019 – 20 April 2021
- Prime Minister: Boris Johnson
- Preceded by: Tobias Ellwood
- Succeeded by: Leo Docherty

Member of Parliament for Plymouth Moor View
- In office 7 May 2015 – 30 May 2024
- Preceded by: Alison Seabeck
- Succeeded by: Fred Thomas

Personal details
- Born: John Luther Mercer; 17 August 1981 (age 45) Dartford, Kent, England
- Party: Conservative
- Spouse: Felicity Cornelius (m. 2014)
- Children: 3
- Education: Royal Military Academy, Sandhurst
- Website: johnnymercer.co.uk

Military service
- Allegiance: United Kingdom
- Branch/service: British Army
- Years of service: 2002–2013
- Rank: Captain
- Unit: 29 Commando Regiment Royal Artillery
- Battles/wars: War in Afghanistan: Operation Herrick

John Luther Mercer (born 17 August 1981) is a British Conservative Party politician, former Member of Parliament and former British Army officer who served as Minister of State for Veterans' Affairs from July to September 2022 and from October 2022 to July 2024. He was Parliamentary Under-Secretary of State for Defence People and Veterans from July 2019 to April 2021. A member of the Conservative Party, Mercer served as the Member of Parliament (MP) for Plymouth Moor View from 2015 to 2024.

In April 2021, after notifying the chief whip of his intention to resign his position as Parliamentary Under-Secretary of State, he was dismissed by Prime Minister Boris Johnson. In July 2022, he was appointed Minister for Veterans' Affairs at the Cabinet Office – attending Cabinet – following Johnson's announcing his intention to resign as Leader of the Conservative Party. Mercer was dismissed from the position in September 2022 by Prime Minister Liz Truss. In October 2022, he was reappointed Minister of State for Veterans' Affairs by Truss' successor Rishi Sunak.

At the 2024 general election, he lost his seat to Fred Thomas of the Labour Party.

== Early life and education ==
John Luther Mercer was born on 17 August 1981 in Dartford, Kent. The son of a banker and a nurse, he grew up in a Strict Baptist family with seven siblings. Between 1995 and 2000, he was educated at Eastbourne College, a co-educational independent school in Eastbourne, East Sussex. After completing school, he worked as an intern in the City of London from 2000 to 2002.

== Military career ==
In June 2003, Mercer was commissioned as a second lieutenant in the Royal Artillery after graduating from Royal Military Academy, Sandhurst. He was promoted to lieutenant in April 2005. He passed the All Arms Commando Course and served mostly with 29 Commando Regiment Royal Artillery and 3rd Regiment Royal Horse Artillery. He was promoted to captain in April 2008. He served three tours in Afghanistan: as a liaison and training officer with Afghan forces; attached to a special forces unit; and as a co-ordinator of artillery and air strikes in support of ground operations. Mercer retired from military service in December 2013.

In 2017, two years after becoming an MP, Mercer published We Were Warriors: One Soldier's Story of Brutal Combat, a memoir of his upbringing and army service, especially his time in Afghanistan.

== Political career ==
=== Member of Parliament ===
Mercer has said that he was not politically active in his younger years and the first time he voted was for himself when he first stood for office. He said that he entered politics with a view to improving the care of veterans and felt that he was a Conservative because he regarded the "massive welfare state that saps the ambition and drive of a younger generation" as a problem. After contacting ex-military Conservative MP Bob Stewart, he was selected as the Conservative Party candidate for Plymouth Moor View two months after leaving the army in February 2014.

Mercer has said he was largely responsible for organising his own campaign "on the cheap". To raise funds, he worked on building sites and appeared in a Dove shower gel advertisement.

At the 2015 general election, Mercer was elected as MP for Plymouth Moor View, winning with 37.6% of the vote and a majority of 1,026. Mercer delivered his maiden speech in the House of Commons on 1 June 2015, stating his "main missions" in Parliament to be improving provision for mental health and support for war veterans. He has been critical of the Iraq Historic Allegations Team.

Mercer was opposed to Brexit prior to the 2016 EU referendum. He later said that the result to leave should be respected.

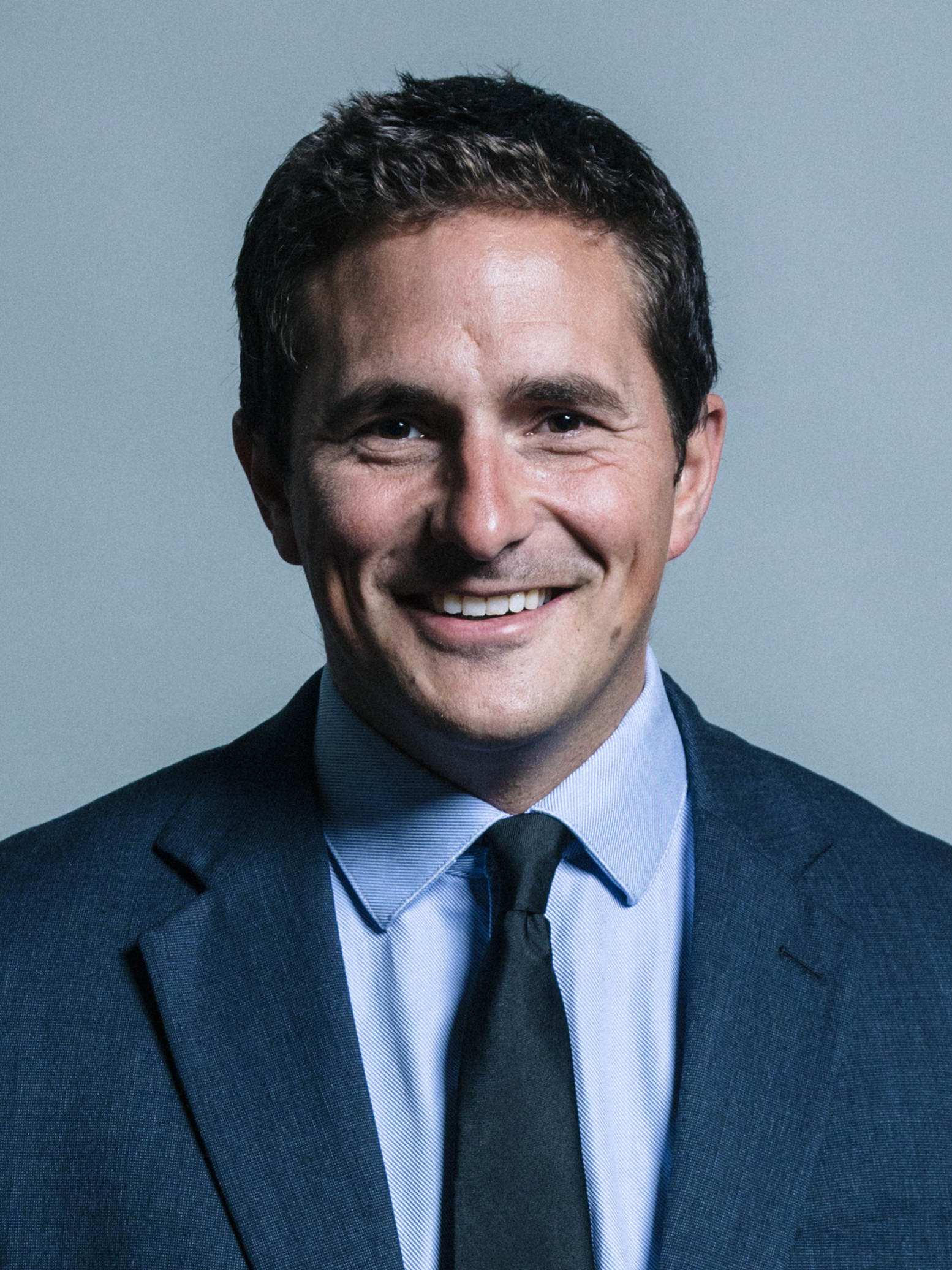
Official portrait, 2017

At the snap 2017 general election, Mercer was re-elected with an increased vote share of 51.9% and an increased majority of 5,019.

In 2018 Mercer appeared in Celebrity Hunted, a Channel 4 television programme where participants go on the run and images are released of them so people can try to track them down. While taking part in the programme he missed the meeting of the Health and Social Care Committee, of which he was a member, shortly before Parliament rose for the summer recess. Mercer defended his decision, stating that he had used his position to raise money for charity and had brought his parliamentary roles into filming.

In 2018, Mercer took on a second job working 20 hours a month as a consultant to Crucial Academy for a salary of £85,000 (equivalent to £350 per hour). The Labour Party parliamentary candidate Charlotte Holloway accused him of neglecting his constituency duties to earn a "staggering" amount of money. Mercer said the accusation "smacked of political jealousy". In April 2019 the BBC reported that his salary at Crucial Academy was funded by the marketing agent for the failed London Capital and Finance bond scheme, although Crucial Group later denied this.

In an interview with The House magazine in 2018, Mercer suggested that his values no longer aligned with the current Conservative party leadership and said there would be "absolutely no chance" that he would stand as a candidate of the party at this time.

In the House of Commons he has sat on the Defence Committee, the Defence Sub-Committee (2015–19) and the Health and Social Care Committee (2017–19).

In 2019, Mercer announced that he would no longer vote for any laws that Theresa May's cabinet presented before Parliament (with the exception of Brexit-related legislation) until new laws were implemented which would end the practice of prosecuting British service members who were deployed to Northern Ireland as part of Operation Banner, stating that "these repeated investigations with no new evidence, the macabre spectacle of elderly veterans being dragged back to Northern Ireland to face those who seek to re-fight the conflict through other means without any protection from a Government who sent them almost 50 years ago, is too much".

At the 2024 United Kingdom General Election, Mercer lost his Plymouth Moor View seat to Labour party candidate Fred Thomas, losing by 5,604 votes, 31.7% down from the previous election. Following, Mercer criticised the new government, and prime minister Keir Starmer, for failing to appoint a new Minister of State for Veterans' Affairs at the same time as the rest of his cabinet. He said; "You will note already that, despite his explicit personal promises in the election campaign, Keir Starmer has not appointed a veterans minister to his cabinet", adding, "If you understand what veterans need from their Government, this matters very much."

=== Expenses ===
Mercer has been challenged over his expenses several times. His campaign to get elected as an MP in 2015 was subsequently the subject of a police investigation following allegations that it breached rules on campaign spending. Mercer admitted to police that his account of expenses had been incorrect, but stated that the errors were minor and his spending had not breached legal limits. The Crown Prosecution Service decided not to charge him, and the case was dropped.

In 2015, he was criticised by the TaxPayers' Alliance after it was revealed he had purchased five Apple iMac computers on his Commons expenses, rather than 'cheaper equivalents'. Mercer responded that the purchases were appropriate and 'were cheaper than the desktop computers offered to MPs by the House of Commons' official supplier'. He was criticised by two anonymised complaints to IPSA in May 2016 for claiming £2,500 on expenses for "professional services" on social media management, and in December 2017 the Independent Parliamentary Standards Authority opened an investigation to determine whether Mercer had been paid business expenses he should not have been. He repaid £931.20 in telephony costs and the Compliance Officer made four recommendations to IPSA to improve its guidance to MPs and its processes for checking claims were correct.

Since 2015 Mercer has employed his wife on a part-time basis.

=== Junior ministerial role ===
Mercer was an early backer of Boris Johnson during the 2019 Conservative Party leadership election. He said that he believed "Boris is the man of the moment" and was capable of securing a better Brexit deal for the United Kingdom. On 28 July 2019, Mercer was appointed as Minister for Defence People and Veterans in Johnson's government. In the role, Mercer's responsibility includes armed forces personnel and veterans' welfare. Mercer was also tasked by the Prime Minister to focus on ending the legal pursuit of former service personnel, especially those who had served during the Troubles in Northern Ireland.

In 2019, Mercer was accused of having broken the ministerial code for not resigning from his role at a training firm whilst in government. He held a second job as a director of Crucial Academy Ltd, which retrains former military personnel. Shadow Cabinet ministers Tom Watson and Nia Griffith wrote a letter to the Cabinet Secretary Mark Sedwill asking him to investigate whether Mercer had broken the code through his directorship at the company.

At the 2019 general election, Mercer was again re-elected with an increased vote share of 60.7% and an increased majority of 12,897.

Mercer worked to help military veterans to obtain a veterans ID card before stepping down from the position of Parliamentary Under-Secretary of State for Defence People and Veterans in April 2021.

In 2021, Mercer was "sacked by text" after offering to resign at the end of Wednesday 21 April, but refusing to go earlier. In a tweet, Mercer said he was "relieved of [his] responsibilities in Government" because of his disagreements with the scope of the proposed Overseas Operations Bill. The bill was designed to protect UK military veterans from "unfounded prosecutions", but because it only covered operations conducted outside the United Kingdom (such as in Iraq and Afghanistan), Mercer said it was a "red line" for him that British service members who were deployed to Northern Ireland would be excluded from it. The bill's key proposals were subsequently rejected by the House of Lords. Mercer told Times Radio that he thought the Second Johnson ministry was "the most distrustful, awful environment I've ever worked in".

He returned to government after the 2022 British cabinet reshuffle as Minister of State for Veterans' Affairs, attending Cabinet. In July 2022 he was appointed as a member of the Privy Council. He was removed from this position on 6 September 2022 when Liz Truss became prime minister, an act which prompted Mercer's wife to call Truss "an imbecile". Mercer was reappointed to his previous role as Minister of State for Veterans' Affairs, attending Cabinet, following Rishi Sunak's appointment as Prime Minister.

In 2023, Mercer was accused by his constituency Labour opponent Fred Thomas, of failing to meet his pledge of ending involuntary veterans' homelessness. Official government data from the Department for Levelling Up, Housing and Communities recorded 2,110 households with someone who served in the armed forces assessed as homeless in 2022–23, up from 1,850 households in the previous year. Using these statistics, the Labour Party reported that instead of ending involuntary veterans' homelessness, the actual number was rising by 14% per annum. Mercer rejected the accusation saying "I made a very clear promise on ending veterans sleeping rough because of a lack of provision, this year. I met that promise" adding "Of course people will try and twist everything I say and do". When Carol Vorderman retweeted Thomas's tweet, Mercer responded by tweeting "You are both deliberately misleading people. For clicks. Because that makes your shit lonely life feel better. No-one normal really cares about your view. They think you're mad."

In the lead up to the 2024 general election, Mercer criticised his rival constituency opponent Fred Thomas, a former Royal Marine captain of being a "real-life Walter Mitty" and claimed he's lied about "leading troops in combat. He never has… If he's going to lie about that, what else is he going to lie about?". Thomas told the BBC "I remain unable to discuss much of my service, something which Johnny Mercer – as a former defence minister – is keenly aware of". The Labour Party later told the BBC that Thomas had been misquoted in an earlier Guardian article about having served in combat.

==== Afghan Unlawful Killings inquiry evidence ====
Mercer gave oral evidence to the Afghan Unlawful Killings inquiry in 2024, in which he was critical of the Ministry of Defence. Mercer had in January 2020 described, as a government minister to the House of Commons, media allegations of extrajudicial killings by United Kingdom Special Forces in the War in Afghanistan as untrue. This statement had been based on briefings within the Ministry of Defence, which Mercer said he subsequently discovered to be incorrect. Mercer told the inquiry he was angry that the Director Special Forces, the Chief of the General Staff and the Defence Secretary Ben Wallace had "not done their job that was incumbent upon them with their rank and privileges in those organisations" in allowing him to make statements to the Commons which they knew to be untrue. He expressed his later inability to disprove alleged war crimes by the SAS in Afghanistan despite seeking evidence, citing warnings from special forces members. The inquiry also scrutinised the adequacy of a prior investigation by the Royal Military Police.

Mercer said he had found working under Wallace "very difficult". Evidence was submitted that in an August 2020 letter to Wallace, Mercer had written:

That I have been allowed to read out statements to the House of Commons that individuals in strategic appointments in the department knew to be incorrect is completely unacceptable. These were clearly not complaints by a "small number of individuals within the investigations team" but widespread. ... I have continually downplayed these allegations in public, too, to support UKSF1 [the SAS] and the department. That was clearly a mistake.

He stated in oral evidence:

So there were two issues – one was it was completely unacceptable that I'd asked to see this information and the first I read about it was in The Sunday Times. Secondarily, I was very cross that I had been allowed to make a statement in the House of Commons in January that year that was clearly incorrect when faced with the evidence that existed within my own department – and for me that was a kind of red line being crossed, in terms of "we're not on the same side here".

In 2024, Mercer was given 10 days to disclose source of claims British troops engaged in war crimes in Afghanistan or face a potential jail term. He often declined to reveal the source of allegations of murder who covered up during his time as a backbench MP. Lord Justice Charles Haddon-Cave, the chair of the Afghanistan inquiry, who was working to obtain the consent of whistleblowers to pass on their names, gave time to Mercer until 5 April to provide a witness statement containing the names. He subsequently provided further information to the inquiry, but did not disclose any names and no further action was taken against him.

== Personal life ==
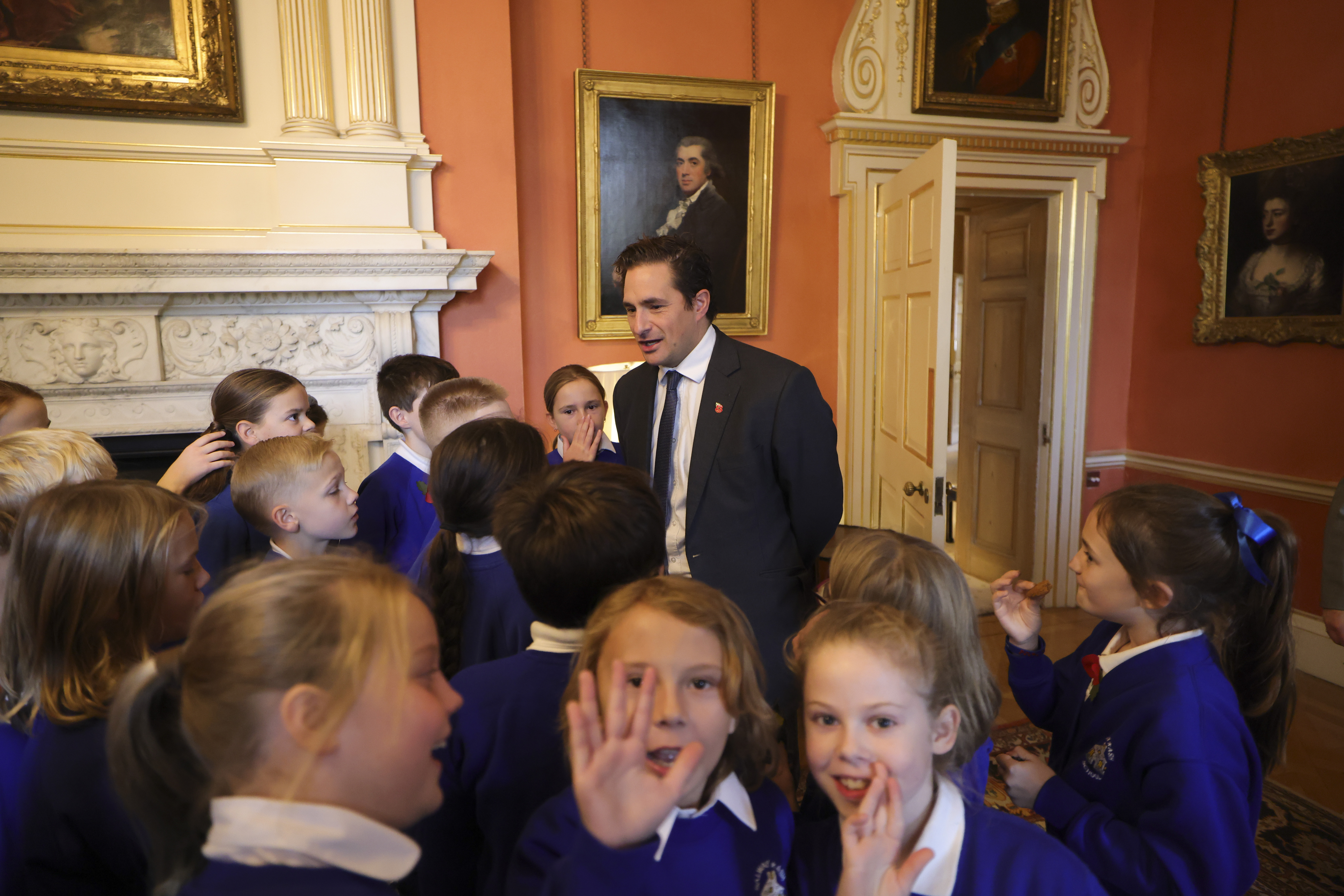
Mercer interacting with schoolchildren in November 2023.

Mercer is married to Felicity and they have three children. They live on the edge of Bodmin Moor, in Cornwall. For his work in Parliament, Mercer said in 2016 that he stays in a hotel on expenses. When first elected, he slept in East London on his boat several nights a week, stating in The Daily Telegraph at the time that it reduced his expenses costs. After local media reported he had started using hotels instead, he said it was due to the weather conditions and that his expenses claims were still lower than the maximum that could be allowed.

On a summer boat trip in 2016, he rescued fellow Conservative MP Scott Mann who jumped into the water having been "ashamed to admit" he could not swim. In 2018 he won Channel 4's Celebrity Hunted Stand Up to Cancer, sharing the title with AJ Pritchard. In August 2020, Mercer sustained a head injury while canoeing on the Tamar, which was treated at Launceston medical centre; he subsequently spent three nights in Derriford hospital, following an infection complication requiring surgery.

In 2022, Mercer said that he had received death threats and online abuse from an anonymous person in Plymouth. In October 2023 he appeared on Channel 4 in the first episode of the prison documentary Banged Up.

== Honours ==
OSM for Afghanistan (with Clasp)
Queen Elizabeth II Diamond Jubilee Medal

- He was sworn as a member of the Privy Council of the United Kingdom on 19 July 2022, entitling him to the honorific prefix "The Right Honourable" for life.

== Notes ==
Parliament of the United Kingdom
Preceded by Alison Seabeck	Member of Parliament for Plymouth Moor View; 2015–2024	Succeeded by Fred Thomas
Political offices
Preceded by Tobias Ellwood	Parliamentary Under-Secretary of State for Defence People and Veterans; 2019–2021	Succeeded by Leo Docherty
Preceded by New post	Minister of State for Veterans' Affairs; 2022–2024	Succeeded by Al Carns
