= Fred Thomas (British politician) =

British politician (born 1992)

Fred Thomas MP
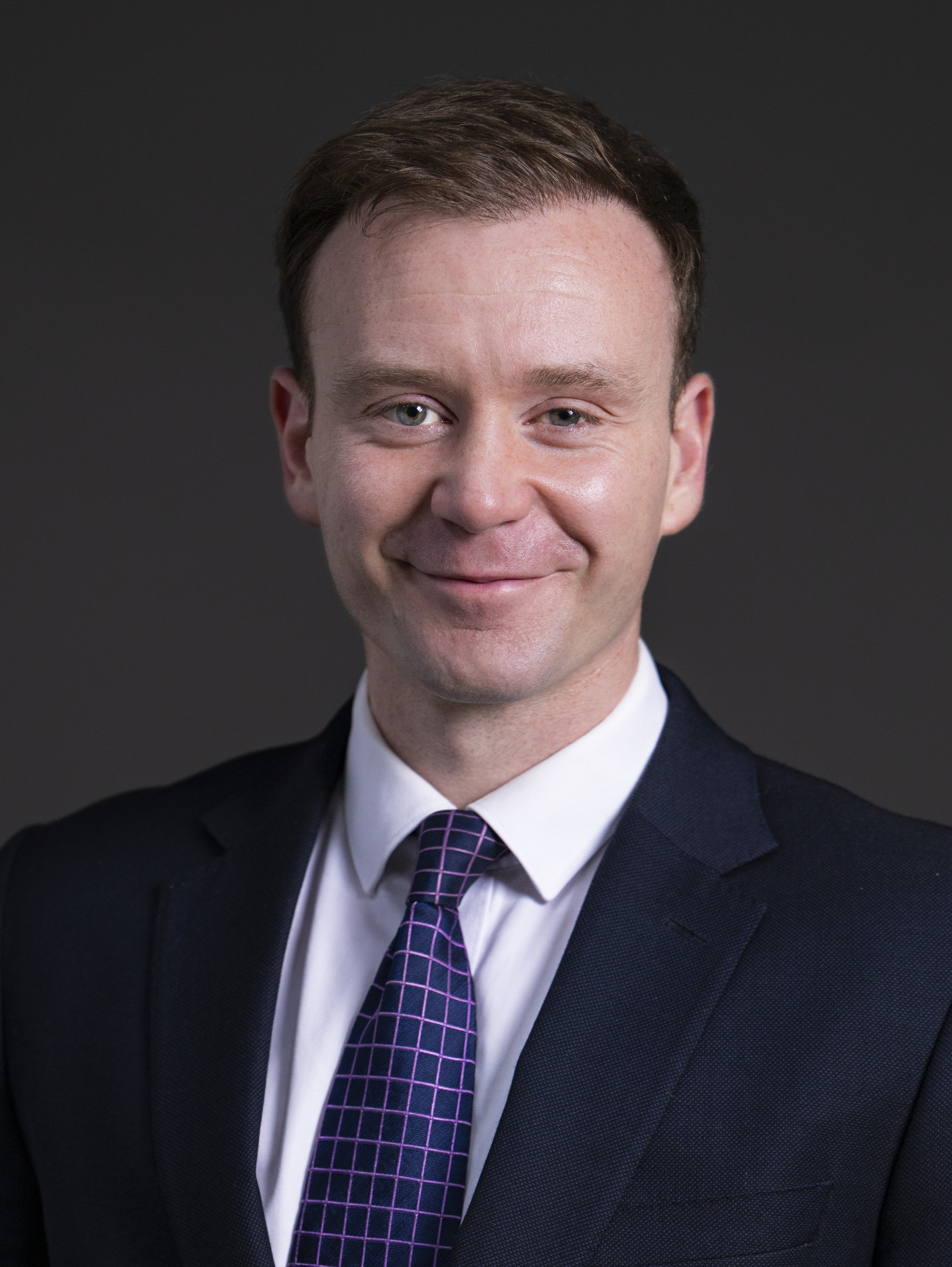
- Official portrait, 2026

Member of Parliament for Plymouth Moor View
- Incumbent
- Assumed office 4 July 2024
- Preceded by: Johnny Mercer
- Majority: 5,604 (13.1%)

Personal details
- Born: Frederick Jacob Theseus Thomas; 10 March 1992 (age 34) London, England
- Party: Labour
- Relatives: Charles Thomas (grandfather); Jessica Mann (grandmother)
- Education: King's College London
- Website: www.fredforplymouth.com
- Military career
- Allegiance: United Kingdom
- Branch: Royal Marines
- Service years: 2016–2023
- Rank: Captain
- Service number: 30261385

Frederick Jacob Theseus Thomas (born 10 March 1992) is a British Labour Party politician and former Royal Marines officer. He has been Member of Parliament (MP) for Plymouth Moor View since 2024, defeating veterans minister Johnny Mercer.

== Early life and education ==
Thomas was born on 10 March 1992 in London, England. He was born to a civil servant and a teacher, and has four siblings. He is a grandson of historian Charles Thomas and writer Jessica Mann on his father's side, and a grandson of Christopher Brett, 5th Viscount Esher, on his mother's side. He was educated at Winchester College and studied politics, religion and ethics at King's College London. He learned to read and write in Arabic and studied abroad in Egypt shortly after the Arab Spring.

== Military service ==
Thomas was commissioned in the Royal Marines on 5 September 2016, and was appointed to the trained strength on 13 December 2018 with the rank of lieutenant. He served as a troop commander in 40 Commando from 2018 to 2020. He was promoted to captain on 5 March 2020. He was second in command of a squadron in 43 Commando from 2020 to 2022. During his career, he trained in Arctic warfare and was employed in nuclear security at HMNB Clyde. He also became the Royal Marines' light heavyweight boxing champion.

He left full-time service in February 2023, and subsequently joined the Royal Marines Reserve.

== Political career ==
Thomas was one of fourteen former services personnel standing as Labour candidates in the 2024 general election.

In October 2024, Thomas was elected to the Defence Select Committee and was a founding member of the All-Party Parliamentary Group (APPG) on Defence Technology, which aims to improve understanding of the UK's defence technology sector.

=== National Campaigns ===
Thomas proposed reforms to the regulation of drones and uncrewed systems, aimed at accelerating their development and deployment within UK defence. Thomas has written about the challenges of adopting new technologies, arguing that a risk-averse culture within the Ministry of Defence can hinder innovation.

In January 2026, he organised a letter to then Prime Minister Keir Starmer, signed by over 60 Labour MPs, calling for the UK to introduce an Australia-style ban of social media for children under 16.

=== Local Campaigns ===
Thomas has campaigned for a new A&E department at Derriford Hospital in his constituency of Plymouth Moor View. He wrote to Boris Johnson, asking for an apology for his Government's "broken promises" and has asked the Deputy Prime Minister about Derriford in PMQs, held meetings with Health Ministers, and joined staff on an A&E shift.

In 2024 Thomas launched the "Football For All" campaign with the Argyle Community Trust, Plymouth Argyle F.C.'s charity, to provide free football for children.

Thomas has taken a keen interest in SEND provision, due to the need for improvements in Plymouth Moor View. Thomas' first visit as an MP was to Mill Ford special needs school in Plymouth.

=== Controversy ===
Thomas stood against Conservative MP Johnny Mercer in Plymouth Moor View. Mercer accused Thomas of exaggerating his military record over a profile in the Guardian newspaper which stated Thomas had told the journalist he had "served in combat missions". Mercer – himself a combat veteran from the War in Afghanistan – said Thomas had never served in combat, and was wrong to claim he had. Alistair Carns, a decorated former colonel and fellow Labour Party Candidate in the election, defended Thomas by stating that he had served in high-risk areas and that an argument between veterans about their service was not what voters wanted. Alternately, Sir Ben Wallace, the Defence Secretary at the time of the alleged "service in combat" supported Mercer, his fellow Conservative, stating he knew exactly what Thomas had done during his time in the Royal Marines and that Thomas had never served in combat as he claimed.

Thomas said he could not share details due to the sensitive nature of his work but cited a certificate highlighting his operational experience, however the Labour Party later claimed that Thomas's words had been "misreported" and blamed the journalist for the mistake. At the election, Thomas was elected as MP for Plymouth Moor View with 17,665 votes (41.2%), a majority of 5,604 over Mercer.

Parliament of the United Kingdom
| Preceded by Johnny Mercer | Member of Parliament for Plymouth Moor View; 2024–present | Incumbent |
