= High Data Rate =

High Data Rate or high data rate may refer to:

- High Data Rate, the previous name of Evolution-Data Optimized, a wireless telecommunications standard
- High Data Rate, a data rate defined in the InfiniBand communications standard
- High Data Rate, a mode in the I3C bus standard
- High data rate, a data stream in the Advanced Extremely High Frequency constellation of communications satellites

== See also ==
- Data rate (disambiguation)
