= Isca Academy =

Location
- Earl Richards Road South; Exeter, Devon, EX2 6AP; England
- Coordinates: 50.70692°N 3.5111°W

Information
- Type: Academy
- Department for Education URN: 139682 Tables
- Ofsted: Reports
- Headteacher: Vicki Joyce
- Gender: Mixed
- Age: 11 to 16
- Enrolment: 680 as of January 2015
- Houses: Maia, Minerva, Saturn & Apollo
- Colours: Green; Blue; Yellow; Red
- Website: www.iscaexeter.co.uk

Isca Academy (formerly Isca College of Media Arts and Priory High School) is a mixed secondary school located in Exeter in the English county of Devon.

== Structure ==
Previously a community school administered by Devon County Council, Isca converted to academy status on 1 October 2013 sponsored by the Ted Wragg Trust. However, the school continues to coordinate with Devon County Council for admissions.

Ofsted visited in 2016 and declared it to be a good school. They felt the head and the governors were realistic and understood the strengths and weaknesses of the school and had long-term plans for continual improvement.

== Curriculum ==
Isca Academy offers GCSEs, BTECs and ASDAN courses as programmes of study for pupils. Some courses are offered in conjunction with Exeter College.

The school emphasises its non-formal curriculum, which it believes develops skills needed to become successful learners.

=== Formal curriculum ===
The school has adopted a fortnightly timetable and the two year Key Stage 3 (Years 7 and 8) which allows for more time in Key Stage 4 (Years 9, 10 and 11). All students study Religious Education and PSHE and enhanced topical themes in a tutorial and assembly programme.

The core subjects in both key stages are English, Maths and Science.

Students start French in Year 7 and can learn Spanish in as well in Year 8. Creative Arts subjects in Years 7 and 8 are taught on a rotation, each student will study 2 of the subjects for 4 hours per fortnight.

In Key Stage 4 students continue with the core subjects and choose three options. Students studying separate sciences have 12 lessons in total per fortnight and only 2 RE lessons. The current offer of Options Subjects for year 9, 10 and 11 students are: French, Spanish, Computing, Geography, History, Music, Drama, Dance, Resistant Materials, Food and Nutrition, Art, Photography, Futsal, and PE.

=== Extra-curricular programme ===
There are a variety of educational visit and trips, outside lesson groups, outdoor pursuits and opportunities to get involved in outside organisations. To start with there is a week-long Year 7 residential trip. Then pupils may join The Duke of Edinburgh for All Scheme or the Royal Marine Cadets, a CCF Unit. They may get involved in the Ten Tors, Exe Valley Challenge or Exe Valley Extreme.

There are book and film clubs, writing workshops and performing arts groups, theatre visits and workshops, sports teams and musical tuition.

== Media attention ==
=== Cliff top selfies ===
Procedures for field trips at the school were reviewed in 2016 after four pupils climbed over a fence to take selfies at the top of the crumbling cliff top at Salcombe Hill, Sidmouth, despite warning signs, prompting a response involving RNLI members.

=== Uniform protest ===
Boys in skirts 22 June 2017

In 2017 during a heat wave, boys at the college wore skirts in protest at not being allowed to wear shorts. One parent claimed that the protest had been sparked by her 14-year-old son being threatened with confinement to an "isolation room" if he wore shorts, and being told sarcastically by the head teacher that wearing a skirt would not incur such a punishment. The protest lasted four days, involving only five boys at the outset, one of whom was punished for his skirt being too short, but had escalated to fifty pupils by its end, including from all year groups. The school then announced that short trousers would be permitted in the summer term of the subsequent school year, subject to consultations.
