= Southway =

Suburb of Plymouth, Devon

Coordinates: 50.4275°N 4.131667°W

- Location within Devon
- Population: 13,029 (2011)
- Unitary authority: Plymouth
- Ceremonial county: Devon
- Region: South West
- Country: England
- Sovereign state: United Kingdom
- Post town: PLYMOUTH
- Postcode district: PL6 6xx
- Dialling code: 01752
- Police: Devon and Cornwall
- Fire: Devon and Somerset
- Ambulance: South Western
- UK Parliament: Plymouth Moor View

Southway is a large suburban housing estate in north-west Plymouth in the English county of Devon. The name is believed to have derived from the route into Plymouth often used by Buckland Abbey monks, which was known as the "South Way".

== Geography ==
The neighbourhood is spread across an often steep topography, which provides good views to the open areas of woodland to the north and south. Southway lies to the north of the Southway Valley Local Nature Reserve, an area of woodland and grassland with extensive footpaths accessible from the housing estate.

== History ==
Part of the city's extensive post-war housing programme, the land upon which Southway is built was previously occupied by three farms, Southway, Langley and Birdcage, as well as parts of four other farms, Clittaford, Heathfield, Hendwell and Wyvell (now Widewell). Some of these are commemorated in street names, and much of the original woodland and greenery remains in large pockets around the estate.

=== Timeline ===
- 1943 - the decision was made to build the estate, as extensive plans for the rebuilding of the blitzed city and its decimated housing stock were being made.
- 1954 - Building work begins in September.
- 1955 - The first residents take up occupancy.
- 1958 - Southway Primary School opens.
- 1962 - The secondary school opens, followed by the estate's two other primary schools (Langley and Tamerton Vale) in the late 1960s.
- 1968 - The second phase of construction is mostly completed.

The 1960s phase also saw a large shopping centre added to the estate, complete with banks and a Public library, as well as two pubs The Falstaff , The Merry Monk (The Abbots Way (The Old Southway)) and The Clittaford Club a Private members club. There are also Anglican and Roman Catholic churches and a community centre .

Nearby is the Southway Industrial Estate, which provides a home to large companies such as BAE Systems and Invensys .

2009 - Southway Primary School changes its name to Beechwood Primary School, following its incorporation into the Southernway Federation along with Langley Primary School (now Oakwood Primary School).

2010 - Beechwood Primary School is relocated to a new building on the site of the former Southway Community College in Rockfield Avenue.

== Housing ==
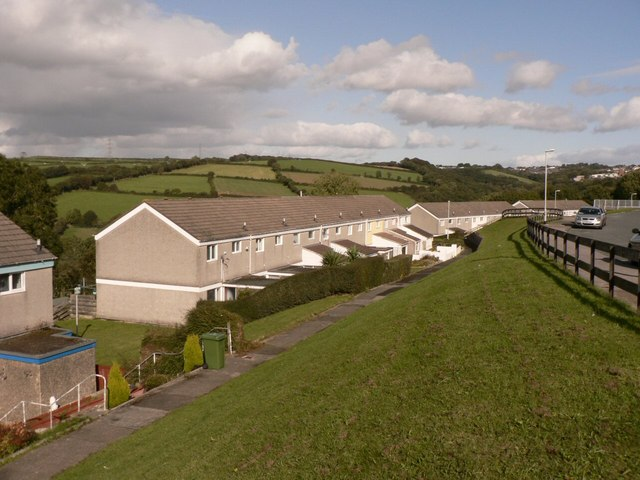
Terraced housing in the north of Southway

Housing types (based on 2009 census data)
Housing type	Southway (%)	Plymouth (%)	England & Wales (%)
Detached	4.0	10.7	22.8
Semi-detached	18.1	29.0	31.6
Terraced	65.5	34.5	26.0
Flats	12.4	25.4	19.2

There are 2855 households in Southway, with an average household size of 2.4. The majority (roughly 66%) of houses in Southway are terraced, with comparatively fewer detached or semi-detached properties. Flats comprise approximately 12% of dwellings. There is a lower than average rate of owner occupancy (54% compared with 68.9% nationally).

Although there is a uniform post-war typology across the neighbourhood, the houses are constructed with a range of materials, mainly stucco and brick. The residential density is fairly low, at 27 dwellings per hectare.

A new residential development, of 490 dwellings, is currently being constructed in the north-east of Southway. Other potential residential developments have also been proposed in Southway, including on the sites of two former primary schools.

=== Residential street names ===
Some of the street names in Southway are named after families who had historically owned land in the Tamerton Foliot area - these include Bonville Road and Bampfylde Way. Other themes for street names include Victorian Plymouthians (such as Burnard Close, after Robert Burnard), Mayors of Plymouth (such as Alger Walk, after William Henry Alger), and British islands and headlands (such as Lundy Close or Flamborough Road).

== Government ==
Southway is within the Southway Ward of Plymouth City Council. It is part of the Plymouth, Moor View parliamentary constituency, having previously been part of the now-defunct constituency of Plymouth Devonport.

== Local amenities ==
Southway has a lack of facilities for a neighbourhood of its size. The neighbourhood's one local centre is located on Flamborough Road. Other local facilities, such as primary schools, are located apart from this centre. In 2017, supermarket Aldi opened a store on Flamborough Road.

=== Education ===
There are two primary schools in Southway, which together comprise the Southernway Federation, with a single executive head and federation governing body. Oakwood Primary School opened in September 2009, after a refurbishment of the site occupied by Langley Infants and Junior Schools. Beechwood Primary is an amalgamation of the former Southway and Tamerton Vale primaries. It opened in September 2008 on the site of the former Southway Primary School, before moving to a new location, on the site of the former Southway Community College, in June 2010. Tamerton Vale Primary had previously been situated on the western edge of the neighbourhood.

Southway Community College, which closed in July 2002 due to a lack of pupils, had been founded by Peter Bindschedler in 1962 as Southway Comprehensive School. Its name later changed to Southway School before becoming Southway Community College in 1994.

There is a public library in Southway shopping centre, which is open six days a week with a range of information services.

=== Health care ===
Southway Surgery, located on Rockfield Avenue, has three GPs and offers a range of National Health Service (NHS) services including a diabetes clinic and a mother and baby clinic.

=== Religion ===
Holy Spirit, Southway is a Church of England church within the Diocese of Exeter, located on Clittaford Road. The church building was built in 1960, largely funded by the trustees of the recently closed Kelly College Mission and constructed according to a design of local architect Mr D. McDonald. The building was later extended in 1985, and now has a capacity of 250 people. Formerly part of the parish of Tamerton Foliot, it became a parish church in its own right in 1971.

Nearby is the Roman Catholic church of St Thomas More, which was built between 1963 and 1964. Originally a separate parish, it joined with the Crownhill church of St Peter at the beginning of 2006.

=== Clubs ===
Plymouth Miniature Steam is a club for model railway engineers, based at Goodwin Park. The club has been running since the 1960s, and based in Southway since 1990. The miniature railway is open to the public on the first and third Sundays of each month.

== Transport ==
Southway is well-served with bus routes. The whole neighbourhood is within a 5-minute walk of a bus stop, and there are frequent services to Plymouth City Centre and Derriford Hospital.

There are no designated cycle routes through the neighbourhood, largely because of the difficulties presented by the steep topography.

== Demography ==
The population of Southway has a higher proportion of over-60s than the city of Plymouth as a whole. Life expectancy is higher in Southway than for Plymouth as a whole, although 24.2% of residents have had a long-term illness and only 61.2% of people consider their health as 'good'.

== Economy ==
There are limited employment opportunities for Southway residents within the neighbourhood, with 2008 figures showing a job ratio of 0.55 per person.

== Crime ==
Police statistics show that the level of crime and anti-social behaviour in Southway is average, with a rate of 11.18 per 1000 people in April 2011. However, in 2010 there was a 29.3% increase in crime compared with 2009, with particular rises in the rate of domestic burglaries (from 6 incidents to 27) and criminal damage (from 80 incidents to 102). According to surveys conducted by PACT and Plymouth City Council, the rate of anti-social behaviour in the community, and the visible lack of police patrolling, is a source of concern to many Southway residents. In 2008, it was ranked the 28th worst neighbourhood in Plymouth in terms of crime.
