= West Exe School =

Secondary school in Exeter, UK

Coordinates: 50.707°N 3.540°W

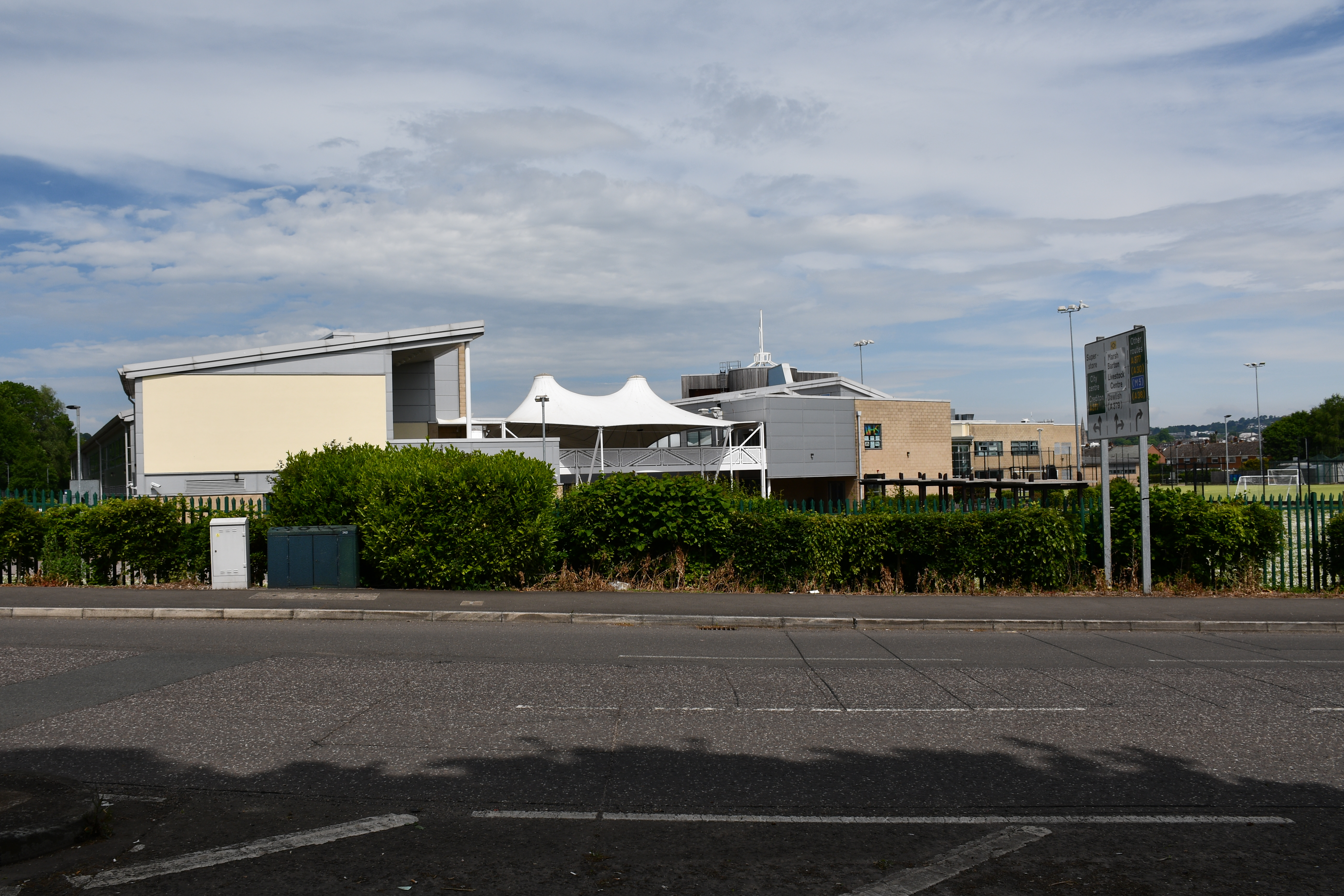
- West Exe School

Location
- Hatherleigh Road; Exeter, Devon, EX2 9JU; England

Information
- Type: Academy
- Motto: Bringing Learning to Life; Excellence for All, in all that WE do
- Established: 1889 (predecessor established); 2014 (present name and logo adopted)
- Local authority: Devon
- Department for Education URN: 145404 Tables
- Ofsted: Reports
- Chair: David Kernick
- Head teacher: James Engineer
- Gender: Coeducational
- Age: 11 to 16
- Enrolment: 1,300
- Houses: Malala(green) Romero(Blue) Daley(Red) Boyan(Yellow)
- Colours: Green, Blue, Yellow and Red
- Publication: West Express (2012); Exe Press (2018-present)
- Website: http://www.westexe.devon.sch.uk/

West Exe School is a coeducational secondary school located in Exeter, with a catchment area covering St Thomas, Alphington, and some parts of Exwick.

== History ==
=== Origins and predecessor institutions (1889–2000s) ===
The origins of the school date back to the Victorian times, when the mergers of a number of smaller schools resulted in the creation in 1889 of two National Schools: one for boys at the end of Cowick Street, and another for infants and girls adjacent to Emmanuel Church on Okehampton Road. In 1900, when St Thomas became part of the city of Exeter, control of these schools moved to the Exeter School Board. The Board moved the boys' school to the bottom of Dunsford Road, and in 1917 the girls' school was destroyed by fire.

In 1921, the Dunsford Road Boys' School was renamed to the John Stocker School, after John Stocker, the recently retired chairman of the Education Board. In 1930 the boys' school was split into John Stocker Senior Boys' School and John Stocker Junior Boys' School, both of which still used the Dunsford Road site. The site on Cowick Street used by the boys' school until 1900 was taken over by a number of girls' and infants' schools that had previously been based in different locations around St Thomas, Redhills and Exwick.

The schools were all merged into a single Boys' Secondary Modern School and Girls' Secondary Modern School in 1967, and in 1972 the two were merged into a single comprehensive school. In 1973 the two halves of the newly united school started using a new site on Cowick Lane, being renamed to Exeter St Thomas High School under the headship of Bill Ridley, who was in post from 1973 until 1997.

Under new headteacher Steve Maddern the school was renamed to West Exe Technology College and a new school logo designed in 1998 to reflect its status as a specialist Technology College under the Government's Specialist Colleges programme. In 2005, a new school building was completed on the playing fields of the St Thomas High School and a new rugby field was built on top of the old building.

Following the end of the Government's Specialist Colleges programme, the school was renamed to West Exe School in 2014, and a new logo was adopted.

=== Academy status ===
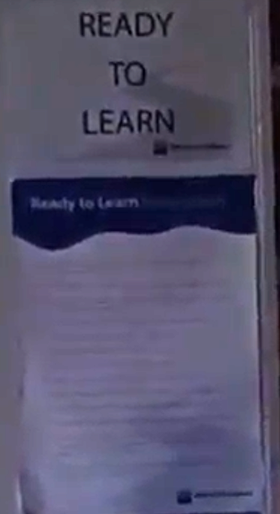
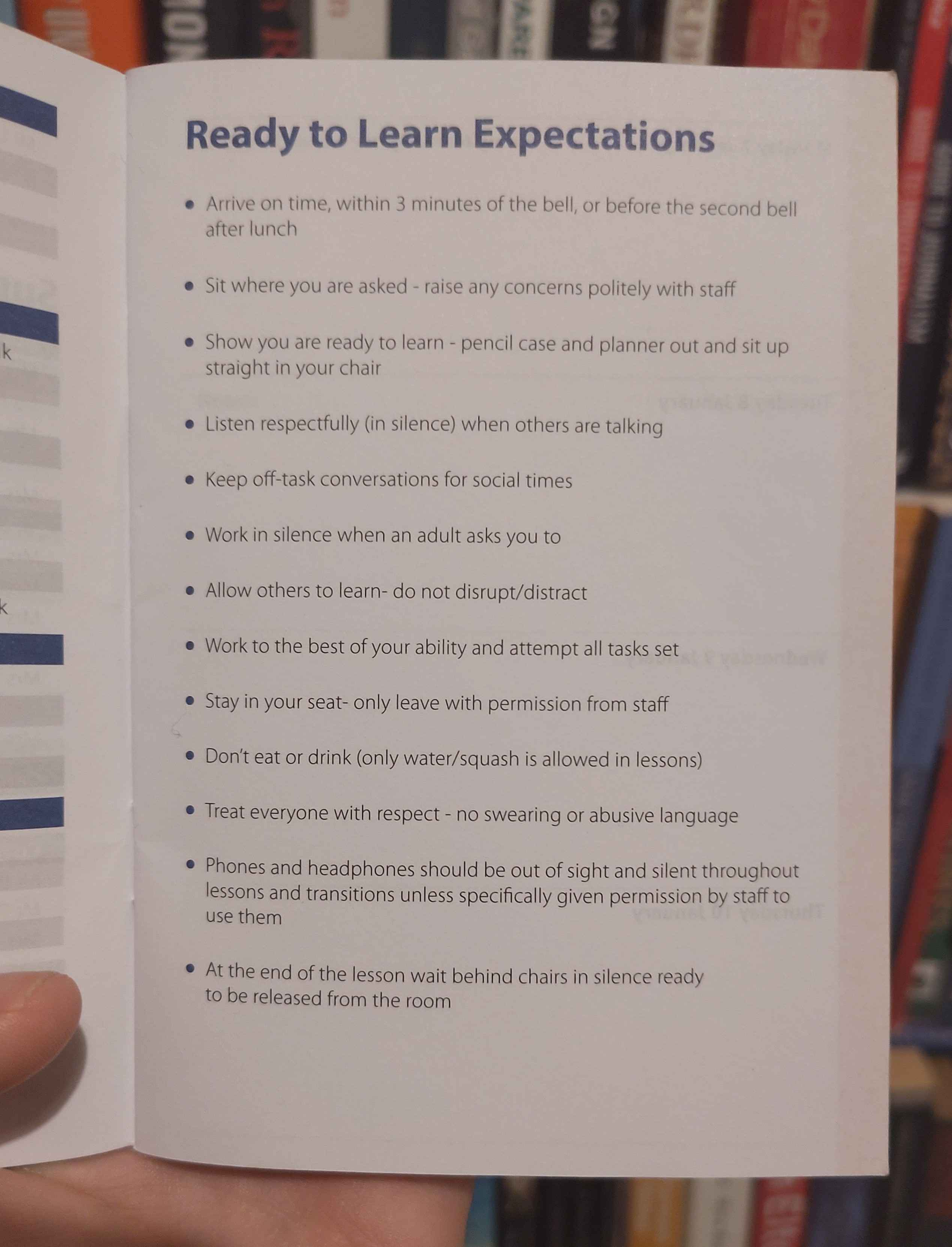
Ready to Learn expections on a classroom poster and printed in a student planner at West Exe School in 2018.

On 28 February 2018, West Exe School became an academy and formally joined the Ted Wragg Multi-Academy Trust. The Trust operates schools across Exeter, Plymouth and East Devon and supports collaboration between schools on curriculum development, school improvement and staff development.

Since joining the Trust, West Exe School has been part of a wider network of schools working together to share expertise, develop teaching and learning, and broaden opportunities for pupils and staff. In April 2024, West Exe School was named among the top five secondary schools in Devon according to published league table data.

In 2026, the school was inspected by Ofsted. Inspectors highlighted strong relationships between pupils and staff, the school’s inclusive culture, partnerships with parents and the range of opportunities available to students beyond the classroom. The report also recognised the school’s support for pupils with special educational needs and disabilities, alongside provision including careers events, work experience, university visits and other enrichment activities.

The Ted Wragg Multi-Academy Trust began introducing Trust-wide policies at the school from September 2017, including the Ready to Learn behaviour policy, later renamed “Reset”. The Reset Ted Wragg campaign group was established in 2023 to raise concerns about some Trust policies and practices. The Trust subsequently held listening sessions with families and reviewed its policies and practices, making changes that varied between schools.
