= Salisbury Road Primary School =

Coordinates: 50.3755°N 4.1239°W

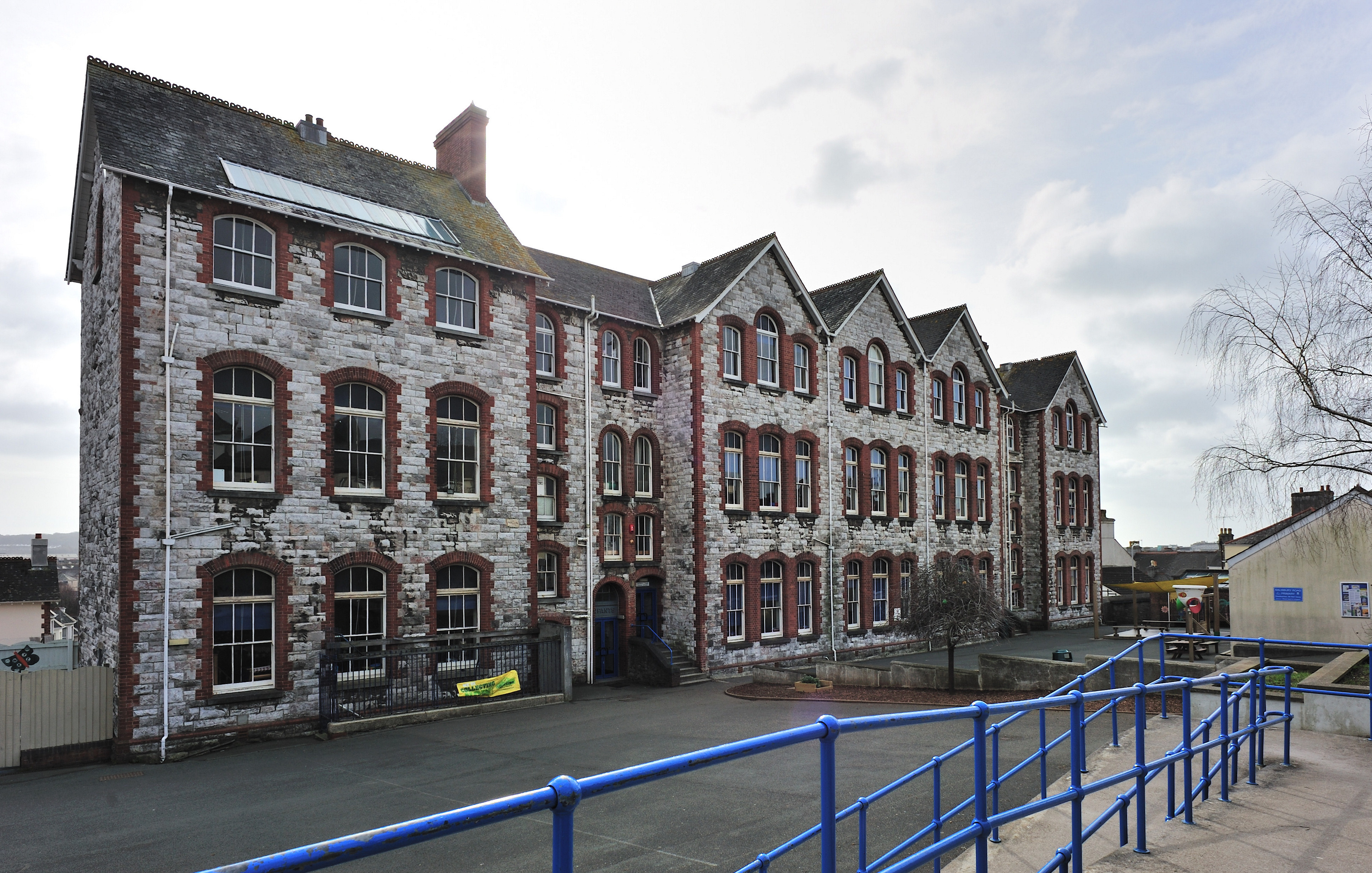

Location
- Salisbury Road; Plymouth, Devon; England

Information
- Type: Academy
- Established: 27 April 1903
- Local authority: Plymouth City Council
- Department for Education URN: 143615 Tables
- Head teacher: Simon Spry
- Gender: Coeducational
- Age: 4 to 11

Salisbury Road Primary School is a coeducational primary school located on Salisbury Road in Plymouth, Devon, England. The school served as a major military hospital during the First World War.

== History ==
The school building was designed by Henry John Snell (1843–1924), who was responsible for a number of Plymouth's 19th century buildings. It was officially opened by Sir George Kekewich on 27 April 1903. The school had capacity for 512 infants, 480 girls and 430 boys. During the First World War, the building was requisitioned by the War Office to create the 4th Southern General Hospital, a facility for the Royal Army Medical Corps to treat military casualties.

The girls school closed in the 1980s and the infants school amalgamated with the junior school to create the current primary school in 2008.

Previously a community school administered by Plymouth City Council, in November 2016 Salisbury Road Primary School converted to academy status. The school is now sponsored by the Learning Academies Trust.
