= Sir John Hunt Community Sports College =

Location
- Lancaster Gardens; Whitleigh; Plymouth, Devon, PL5 4AA; England
- Coordinates: 50.41786°N 4.1431°W

Information
- Type: Foundation school
- Religious affiliation: Mixed
- Founder: Plymouth City Council
- Local authority: Plymouth City Council
- Specialist: Sports
- Department for Education URN: 113533 Tables
- Ofsted: Reports
- Principal: Julie Bevan
- Vice Principal: George Perrins
- Gender: Mixed
- Age: 11 to 19
- Enrolment: 798 as of January 2024
- Capacity: 800
- Houses: Tenzing, Lowe, Hillary, Stephens and Destiville
- Colour: Yellow (Lowe) Green (Stephans) Blue (Hillary) Red (Destiville) Purple (Tenzing)
- Website: http://www.sirjohnhunt.plymouth.sch.uk/

Sir John Hunt Community Sports College is a mixed secondary school and sixth form located in the Whitleigh area of Plymouth in the English county of Devon. The school is named after Sir John Hunt (later Baron Hunt), an army officer who is best known as the leader of the successful 1953 British Expedition to Mount Everest.

== History ==
The school was originally known as Whitleigh Secondary Modern School and then Sir John Hunt Community College before gaining Sports College Status. In 2001, Southway Community College formally merged with Sir John Hunt. Although the school operated over both school campuses for a time, the school was fully consolidated on the Whitleigh site completely in 2005. Sir John Hunt opened its sixth form in 2010, the last secondary school in Plymouth to do so.

As of January 2024, the school is in the process of converting into an academy.

The school is located in the Wood View Learning Community, which also includes Whitleigh Community Primary School and Woodlands Special School, and other community services such as the Youth Centre. The campus is run by a federated Governing Body. Previously a community school solely administered by Plymouth City Council, in June 2015 Sir John Hunt Community Sports College became a foundation school as part of the Wood View Learning Community Trust. However, the school continues to coordinate with Plymouth City Council for admissions.

== Academics ==
Sir John Hunt Community Sports College offers GCSEs and Cambridge Nationals as programmes of study for pupils, while students in the sixth form have the option to study a range of A-levels and further Cambridge Nationals. Some courses are offered in conjunction with Lipson Co-operative Academy and Tor Bridge High.

== Criminal Staffing ==
Mr Ryan Benney (formerly Mr Liam Taylor), was a Computing teacher at Sir John Hunt Community Sports College when he pled guilty and was subsequently convicted for the offence of 3 counts of Making Indecent Photograph or Pseudo-Photograph of Children contrary to the Protection of Children Act 1978 s.1 (a) and 6. As part of the Teaching Regulation Authority's report, the panel found that Mr Benney attempted to conceal his offence in multiple ways, such as by the use of different identities. It is therefore likely that Mr Benney would have continued to offend if he had not been caught; and that his role as a computer science teacher meant he would have been very aware of the dangers of accessing indecent images of children. He was convicted in 2021, in July and pleaded guilty.

Ryan Benny was arrested for 6 months and has been banned from teaching permanently.

== Notable former pupils ==
- Kate Nesbitt, The first female member of the British Royal Navy, and the second woman in the British Armed Forces, to be awarded the Military Cross
