= Lipson Co-operative Academy =

Location
- Bernice Terrace; Lipson; Plymouth, Devon, PL4 7PG; England
- Coordinates: 50.38153°N 4.11089°W

Information
- Type: Co-operative academy
- Department for Education URN: 136668 Tables
- Ofsted: Reports
- Principal: Tom Goodman
- Gender: Coeducational
- Age: 11 to 18
- Colour: INDIGO ORANAGE
- Website: www.lipsonco-operativeacademy.coop

Lipson Co-operative Academy (formerly Lipson Community College) is a coeducational secondary school and sixth form with academy status, located in the Lipson area of Plymouth in the English county of Devon.

Previously a foundation school administered by Plymouth City Council, Lipson Community College converted to academy status on 1 April 2011 using the Co-operative academy model of governance. It was renamed Lipson Co-operative Academy. However, the school continues to coordinate with Plymouth City Council for admissions.

Lipson Co-operative Academy offers GCSEs and BTECs as programmes of study for pupils, while students in the sixth form have the option to study from a range of A-levels, OCR Nationals and further BTECs. Some courses are offered in conjunction with Sir John Hunt Community Sports College and Tor Bridge High. The school also houses the Plymouth associate branch of the Italia Conti Academy, and is the home ground for Plym Valley Ladies Hockey Club and Plymouth University Hockey Club.

In 2022, they joined the Ted Wragg Trust, in which they are accompanied by 17 other schools across Devon.
