= Tor Bridge High =

Location
- Miller Way; Estover; Plymouth, Devon, PL6 8UN; England; 50.4113°N 4.0992°W

Information
- Type: Academy
- Motto: Stronger together, creating better futures.
- Department for Education URN: 137206 Tables
- Ofsted: Reports
- Principal: Tracy Stephenson
- Gender: Mixed
- Age: 11 to 18
- Enrolment: 1,181 as of February 2016
- Houses: Apollo, Athena, Artemis and Cade
- Colours: Teal, Blue, Red, Yellow, Orange, Black
- Website: https://www.torbridge.net

Tor Bridge High (formerly Estover Community College) is a mixed secondary school and sixth form located in the Estover area of Plymouth in the English county of Devon.

Previously a community school administered by Plymouth City Council, Tor Bridge High converted to academy status on 1 August 2011. The school is now part of the Tor Bridge Partnership which includes Plym Bridge Nursery, Tor Bridge Primary School and Cann Bridge School. However Tor Bridge High continues to coordinate with Plymouth City Council for admissions.

Tor Bridge High offers GCSEs and BTECs as programmes of study for pupils, while students in the sixth form have the option to study from a range of A-levels, OCR Nationals and further BTECs. Some courses are offered in conjunction with Lipson Co-operative Academy and Sir John Hunt Community Sports College. The school is also an associate partner college of Plymouth University.
