= All Saints Church of England Academy, Plymouth =

All Saints Church of England Academy

Location
- Honicknowle Lane; Plymouth, Devon, PL5 3NE; England; 50.4025°N 4.1562°W

Information
- Type: Academy
- Religious affiliation: Church of England
- Established: 2010
- Specialist: Business and Enterprise College
- Department for Education URN: 136142 Tables
- Ofsted: Reports
- Chair of Governors: Richard Stevens
- Head teacher: Scott Simpson-Horne
- Gender: Coeducational
- Age: 11 to 19
- Enrolment: 937
- Publication: Switched On!
- Website: http://www.asap.org.uk/

All Saints Church of England Academy, Plymouth is an academy school and business and enterprise college that opened in September 2010 on the existing John Kitto Community College site on Honicknowle Lane in Pennycross, Plymouth, England near the A38.

The academy opened on the existing John Kitto site, with new premises being built and opened in 2013.
