= Estover, Plymouth =

District of Plymouth, Devon, England

Coordinates: 50°25′N 4°06′W

Estover
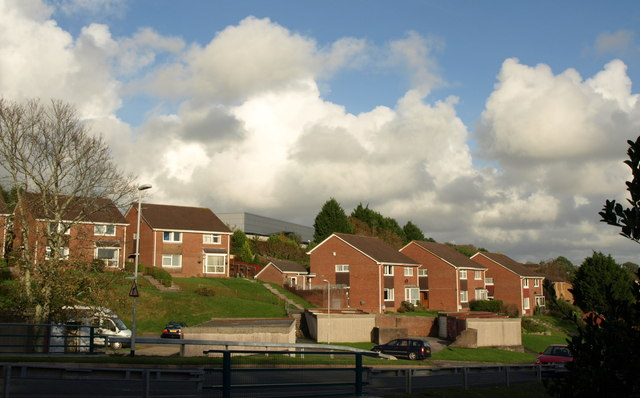
- Houses on Colwill Road, Estover

- Location within Devon
- Unitary authority: Plymouth
- Ceremonial county: Devon
- Region: South West
- Country: England
- Sovereign state: United Kingdom
- Post town: PLYMOUTH
- Police: Devon and Cornwall
- Fire: Devon and Somerset
- Ambulance: South Western

Estover is a district in Devon, England, within the Plymouth boundary area. The original hamlet was extensively developed during the 1970s, into what became back then a large housing estate, consisting almost entirely of council houses (constructor: Wimpey Homes), situated five miles northeast of Plymouth city centre in the English county of Devon. The majority of the houses are now privately owned.

Estover also annexes an industrial estate. It has two schools, Tor Bridge High (formerly Estover Community college) and Tor Bridge Primary, both of which are situated along Miller Way. Estover has one public house, the Jolly Miller. ASDA opened their very first, and large Asda superstore in southern England in Estover in 1976. The industrial estate is home to, amongst others, a Wrigley Company Limited factory.
