= John Harris (Royalist) =

John Harris (1596–1648) of Lanrest, Liskeard in Cornwall and of Radford in the parish of Plymstock in Devon, was an English gentleman who was elected four times as a Member of Parliament for Liskeard in Cornwall, between 1628 and 1644. He supported the Royalist side in the Civil War.

== Origins ==
Harris was the second son of John Harris (1564- June 1623) of Lanrest in Cornwall, Recorder (or Steward) of the Borough of West Looe in Cornwall ( established in 1574) and MP for West Looe in Cornwall in 1614, by his wife Joane Harte, daughter and sole heiress of Robert Harte of Plimston in the parish of Stoke Climsland in Cornwall. His younger brother was Robert Harris (d.1655), Major General of the King's infantry in Plymouth, buried at Tywardreath in Cornwall, where he "lies interred under a marble monument" inscribed as follows:

"In Memory of Robert Harris, Esquire, sometime Major-Generall of his Majesties forces before Plymouth, who was buried here under, the 29th day of June, 1655, and of Honnor Harris, his sister, who was likewise heer under-neath buried, the 17th day of November, 1653".

"Loyal and stout, thy crime this, this thy praise,"
"Thou'rt here with Honour laid, tho' without Bayes."

== Inheritances ==
John Harris was the heir of his childless elder brother Christopher Harris (1590–November 1623) of Lanrest, a Member of Parliament for West Looe in 1621. John Harris was also a great-nephew and sole heir of Sir Christopher Harris (c.1553-1625), MP for Plymouth in 1584, of Radford in the parish of Plymstock in Devon.

== Career ==
In 1628, Harris was elected Member of Parliament for Liskeard and sat until 1629 when King Charles I decided to rule without parliament for eleven years. In April 1640 Harris was re-elected MP for Liskeard in the Short Parliament. He was re-elected for Liskeard in the Long Parliament in November 1640 until he was disabled from sitting in January 1644 for supporting the King.

== Marriage ==
In 1630 he married Elizabeth Johnson (d.1637), a daughter of Emorb Johnson of Bridge in the parish of South Petherton in Somerset and of Bonham in Wiltshire. She died in childbirth in 1637, having produced one surviving son:

- John Harris (died 1677), a Member of Parliament for Liskeard after 1660 and the Restoration of the Monarchy.

Parliament of England
Preceded by Sir Francis Steward; Joseph Jane	Member of Parliament for Liskeard; 1628–1629; With: Sir Francis Steward	Parliament suspended until 1640
Vacant Parliament suspended since 1629	Member of Parliament for Liskeard; 1640–1644; With: George Kekewich 1640; Joseph Jane 1640–1644	Succeeded by Thomas Povey; George Kekewich
