= Henry Bulteel =

English religious controversialist and seceder from the Church of England

Henry Bellenden Bulteel
- Born: 14 September 1800; Plymstock, Devon, England
- Died: 28 December 1866 (aged 66); Plymouth, Devon, England
- Occupation: Clergyman
- Known for: A Sermon on 1 Corinthians ii. 12

Henry Bellenden Bulteel (14 September 1800 – 28 December 1866) was an English priest with radical opinions. He studied at the University of Oxford and became an Anglican curate in Oxford. He adopted High Calvinist opinions, and in 1831 gave a polemic sermon before the university in which he questioned received opinions on free will and salvation, and criticised the university and the Church of England for ignoring the principles of their faith and appointing unsuitable clergy in response to political influence. He then went on an outdoor preaching tour, and as a result was ejected from the Church of England. He formed his own nonconformist church and flirted with Irving's Catholic Apostolic Church before setting up a Strict Baptist chapel.

== Origins ==
Henry Bellenden Bulteel was born at Plymstock in Devon on 14 September 1800, the fourth of ten children of Thomas Hillersdon Bulteel of Bellevue House in the parish of Plymstock in Devon, by his wife Anne Harris, a daughter and co-heiress of Christopher Harris of Bellevue (3rd son of John Harris of Radford in the parish of Plymstock). Bulteel's ancestors had Huguenot origins and had founded the Naval Bank in nearby Plymouth, Devon, in 1774. His brothers went into the navy.

== Early years ==
He attended Eton College, where one of his eyes was knocked out by a cricket ball. He matriculated at Brasenose College, Oxford, on 1 April 1818. As an undergraduate he gained a reputation for rowdiness, and once started a riot between "town and gown" (paying pupils and King's Scholars) during the disturbances over the attempted divorce of Queen Caroline. In 1822 he was stroke of the winning Brasenose boat in the race on the Isis.

== Oxford fellow and curate ==
Bulteel obtained a bachelor's degree in 1822. and was elected fellow of Exeter College on 30 June 1823. In 1824 he rowed for his college as a Fellow of Exeter. He took his master's degree in 1824 and became curate of St Ebbe's Church, Oxford, in 1826. Bulteel was a member of the Oxford Auxiliary of the Church Missionary Society, as was John Henry Newman, who would later also leave the Church of England. He adopted high Calvinist and antinomian views. Bulteel's passion and intensity had great impact on his contemporaries at Oxford. For a short period William Ewart Gladstone fell under Bulteel's influence. On 5 February 1827 Thomas Byrth (1793–1849), then curate at St Clement's Church, Oxford, wrote that Bulteel "has created a most powerful sensation here, by preaching ultra-Calvinism, and circulating Dr Hawker's tracts." Bulteel's evangelical views became so extreme that the university authorities banned students from attending his sermons. Joseph Charles Philpot, a high Calvinist and fellow of Worcester College, wrote,

Bulteel had for some years embraced the doctrines of grace, and preached them with much fervour of mind and strength of expression. This was a new sound at the learned university, and a thing almost unheard of, that a fellow and tutor of one of the colleges ... should embrace so thoroughly and above all proclaim so boldly, the obnoxious doctrines of the Calvinistic creed. His church was crowded with hearers, and among them were seen many of the university students, and now and then a master of arts, myself being one of them, some of whom became his attached and regular hearers.

On 6 October 1829 Bulteel scandalized genteel Oxford by marrying Eleanor Sadler, a pastry cook and sister of Alderman C. J. Sadler, of High Street, Oxford. As was the custom, he then had to vacate his fellowship at Exeter.

On 6 February 1831 Bulteel preached a Sermon on 1 Corinthians ii. 12 at St. Mary's, Oxford, before the University of Oxford. The sermon discussed predestination, free will, justification, and salvation. It included outspoken views on the state of the universities and the Church of England, and caused great excitement. William Gladstone wrote that he "always remembered among the wonderful sights of his life St Mary's 'crammed in all parts by all orders when Mr Bulteel, an outlying calvinist, preached his accusatory sermon (some of it too true) against the university'". The sermon was printed and ran to six editions. Many replies and comments were published.

In his sermon Bulteel said God "doth but reckon that such and such sinners shall become righteous, and, lo! they become righteous instantly, God bestowing upon them faith to lay hold on the robe of Christ's everlasting righteousness, and clothe themselves with these garments of salvation." Righteousness was thus a gift of God rather than the result of a person's deliberate choice. He said that the thirty-nine Articles of the Church of England, which were meant to ensure that only spiritual men joined the ministry, were being ignored. Worldly sinners were allowed to enter the church as a result of political influence. He complained that the college and university authorities would not give proper recommendations to strong Calvinist graduates, but gave good recommendations to "men notorious for nothing so much in their day as profaneness, debauchery, and all kind of riotous living." This could clearly be taken as a reference to his own appointment. He argued that the Church of England needed reform as much as the Church of Rome.

In the summer of 1831 Bulteel toured the west of England. His friend William Tiptaft wrote, "We shall preach in churches, chapels, barns, rooms, or in the open air. We shall, if the Lord strengthens us for the work, give great offence. But it is a glorious work to preach the everlasting gospel. It is the very purpose for which I was ordained. Christ will not turn us out of His Church for following His steps in preaching the gospel in every city and village. I should not be surprised if the Bishop withdraw Bulteel's license as he is only a curate." This last prediction proved accurate. Richard Bagot, Bishop of Oxford, revoked Bulteel's license on 10 August 1831. The churchwardens refused Bulteel access to his church. Bulteel accused the bishop of being "an officer of the Church of Antichrist" and said he could preach where he wanted without the bishop's permission. He continued to preach in Oxford outdoors, drawing large crowds.

== Later years ==
Friends of Bulteel raised money and built a chapel for him at the back of Pembroke College, Oxford. The chapel was named St. Ebbe's Chapel, (Note: St. Ebbe's Chapel, not to be confused with St Ebbe's Church, where Bulteel had been curate.) but was often called Bulteel's Chapel. He preached there based on the teachings of the Plymouth Brethren. The members of the congregation were called Bulteelers. St. Ebbe's Chapel later became the Commercial Road Baptist Chapel.

In 1832 Bulteel visited London and attended the Rev. Edward Irving's chapel. He adopted some of Irving's ideas, and published a book that told how he had cured the illnesses of three women through prayers and intercession, and restored them to health. Bulteel was one of a small number of Evangelical clergymen who joined Irving's Catholic Apostolic Church. Benjamin Wills Newton, an early member of the Plymouth Brethren, was a friend of Bulteel, but turned against the Irvingites when Bulteel began to "heal" members of his congregation and to make bizarre theological speculations based on his religious experience.

In May 1833 Bulteel became disillusioned with Irvine's teachings, and told John Hill of "his gracious deliverance from the awful delusions concerning supernatural gifts". He had come to consider that the gifts were false and that Irving's views on the human nature of Christ was incorrect. After leaving the Irvingites Bulteel set up a Strict Baptist chapel in Oxford. A well-written anonymous poem published in 1845 that denounced the Oxford Movement and John Henry Newman was attributed to him but is likely to be by Richard Burdon. Around 1846 Bulteel left Oxford, and seems to have joined the Plymouth Brethren. Henry Bellenden Bulteel died on 28 December 1866 in Plymouth at the age of 66.

== Publications ==
- Bulteel, Henry Bellenden (1831), A sermon on 1 Corinthians ii. 12, preached before the University of Oxford at St. Marys, on Sunday, Feb. 6, 1831. To which is added A Sequel containing an account of the author's ejectment from his curacy by the Bishop of Oxford for his indiscriminate preaching (6 ed.), Oxford: W. Baxer
- Bulteel, Henry Bellenden (1832), The Doctrine of the Miraculous Interference of Jesus on behalf of Believers ... asserted from Scripture, and proved from facts, addressed to the Church of God at Oxford, W. Baxter
- Bulteel, Henry Bellenden (1832), The Unknown Tongues, or the Rev. Edward Irving and the Rev. Nicholas Armstrong. To which are added Two Letters by the Rev. H. B. Bulteel
- Bulteel, Henry Bellenden (1844), An Address delivered on the opening of a Free Episcopal Church in Exeter, 26 Sept. 1844
- Bulteel, Henry Bellenden (1845), The Oxford Argo, by an Oxford Divine, London: R. Sicklemore. Anonymous
