= Lampago =

Mythical heraldic beast in the form of a "man-tiger or man-lion"

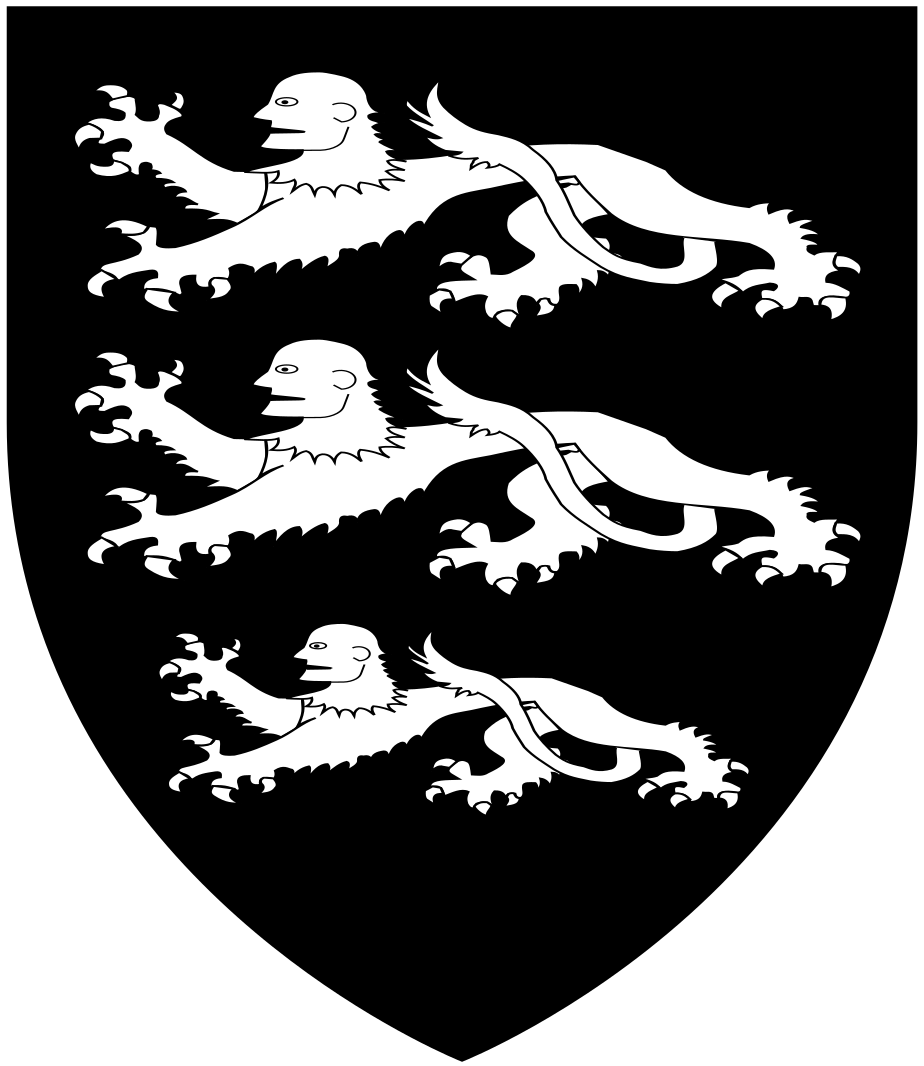
Arms of Radford of Radford: Sable, three lampagoes passant coward in pale argent

A lampago or lympago is a mythical heraldic beast in the form of a "man-tiger or man-lion" with the body of a tiger or lion and the head of a man. It should be distinguished from similar mythical heraldic beasts the manticore and the satyral.

The best-known usage of the lampago in heraldry is in the arms of the ancient Radford family of the manor of Radford in the parish of Plymstock in Devon: Sable, three lampagoes passant in pale coward argent.

== See also ==
- Sphinx
