= George Kekewich (Roundhead) =

George Kekewich was an English politician who sat in the House of Commons in the 1640s. He supported the Parliamentarian side during the English Civil War.

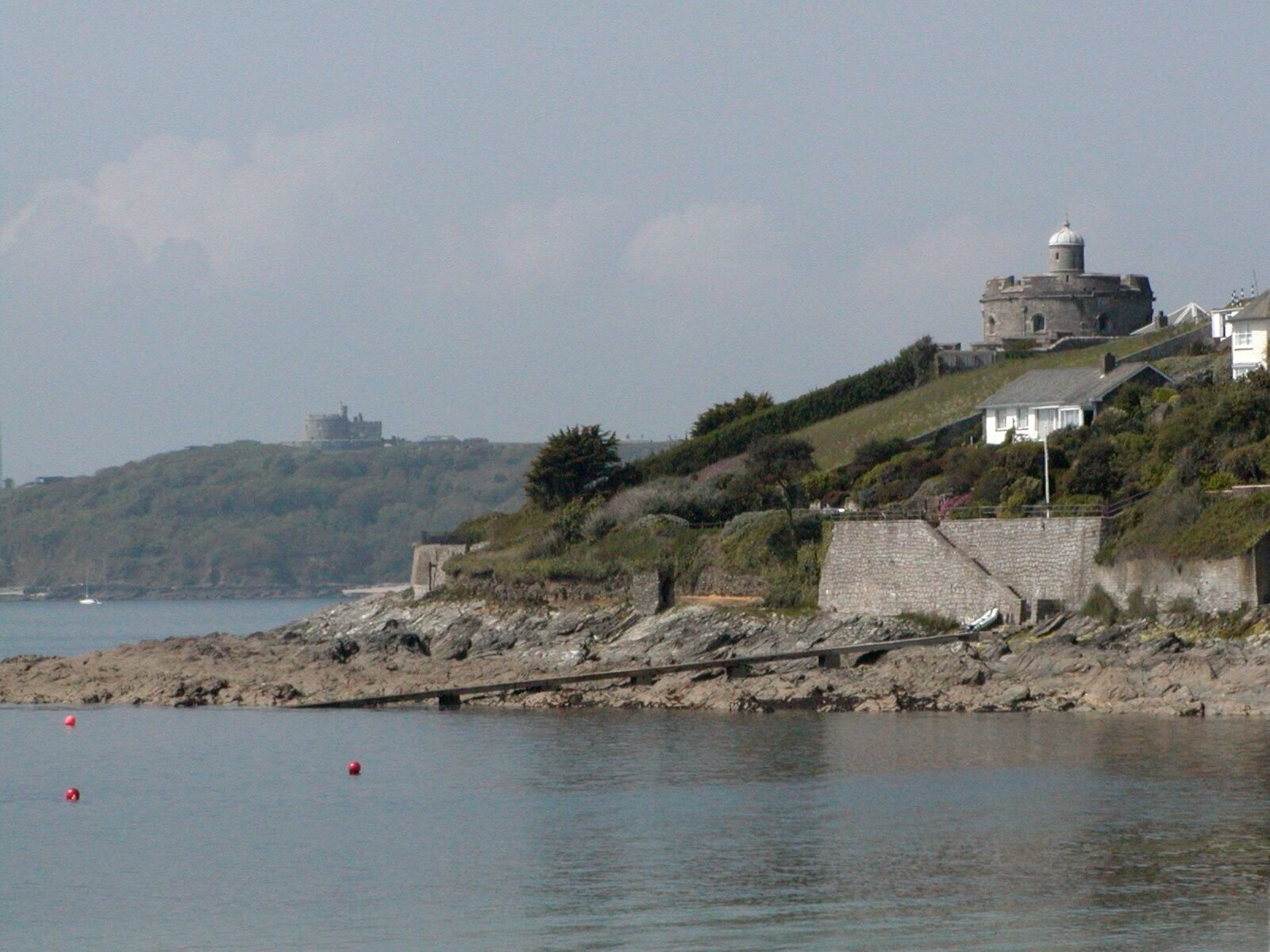
St Mawes Castle (foreground) and Pendennis Castle (background)

In April 1640, Kekewich was elected Member of Parliament for Liskeard for the Short Parliament. He was not elected in November 1640, but supported the Parliamentary cause, becoming a lieutenant colonel. In August 1646 he petitioned the House of Lords "That he hath been in the Service of the State, in Plymouth, Cornwall, and Devonshire, ever since the Beginning of these Troubles, and being reduced, he is out of any Employment Therefore desireth some Place, whereby he may do the State further Service" and as a result was made Governor of St Mawes Castle. He then joined the Long Parliament in 1647 to replace members disabled as Royalists, but was himself excluded in 1648 in Pride's Purge. St Mawes castle remained a prison under his governorship as appears in his correspondence with Robert Bennet.

Parliament of England
Vacant Parliament suspended since 1629	Member of Parliament for Liskeard; 1640; With: John Harris	Succeeded by John Harris; Joseph Jane
Preceded by John Harris; Joseph Jane	Member of Parliament for Liskeard; 1647 – 1648; With: Thomas Povey	Seat not represented until 1659
