= William Harris (born 1504) =

English politician, born 1504

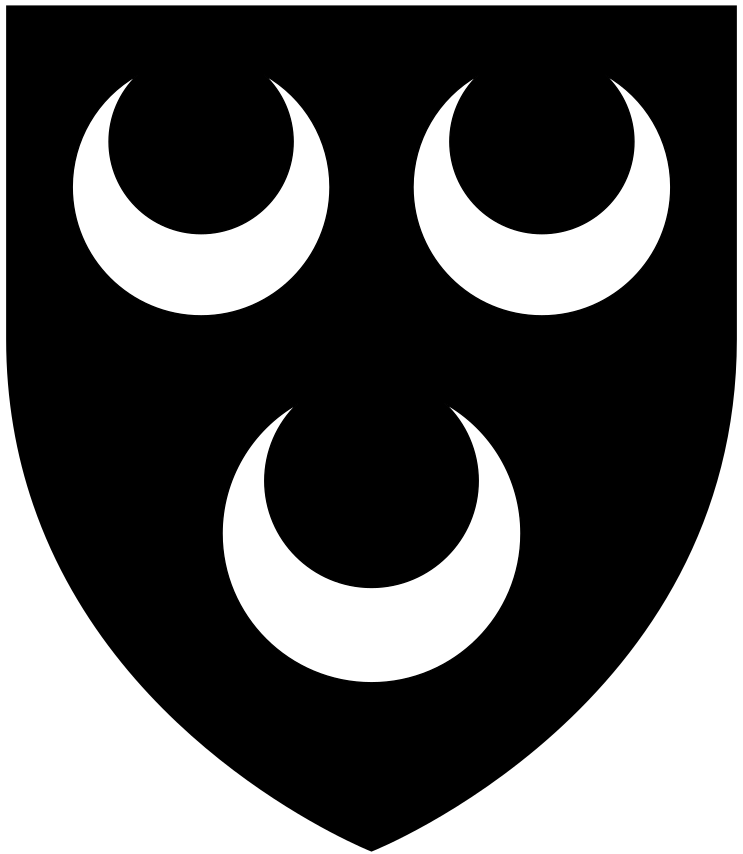
Arms of Harris of Radford: Sable, three crescents argent

William Harris (born 10 March 1504), of Radford in the parish of Plymstock in Devon, was a Member of Parliament for Newport-juxta-Launceston in Cornwall.

== Origins ==
He was the son and heir of Francis Harris (1475–1509) of Radford, by his wife Phillipa Grenville (d. 1524), a daughter of Sir Thomas Grenville (d. 1513), lord of the manors of Bideford in Devon and of Stowe in the parish of Kilkhampton, Cornwall, Sheriff of Cornwall in 1481 and in 1486. She survived her husband and remarried to Humphry Arundell of Lanherne, Cornwall, younger brother of Sir John Arundell (1474–1545), her brother-in-law.

== Career ==
He was a Member of Parliament for Newport-juxta-Launceston in Cornwall, for the fifth (1529–1536) parliament of King Henry VIII, probably served in the sixth (1536) parliament, and may have served in either or both of that king's seventh (1539–1540) and eighth (1539–1542) parliaments.

== Family ==
At some time before June 1527, he married Catherine Trecarrel, a daughter and co-heiress of Henry Trecarrell (alias Esse) of Trecarrell in Cornwall, by whom he had progeny as follows:

- Christopher Harris (c. 1553–1625), a Member of Parliament for Plymouth. He married Barbara Arscott (d. 1597/8), a daughter of John Arscott of Dunsland in the parish of Bradford (or Cookbury) in Devon. His son John Harris died young and pre-deceased his father, thus Radford passed to the descendants of Christopher's sister Jane Harris
- Jane Harris, only daughter, who in 1562/3 at Menheniot in Cornwall married he cousin John Harris (d. 1579) of Lanrest in Cornwall. As her brother's son died young, her progeny became the heirs to Radford.

Parliament of England
New constituency	Member of Parliament for Newport; 1529–1536+ With: Simon Mountford 1529–1536	Succeeded by ?
