= Christopher Harris (died 1625) =

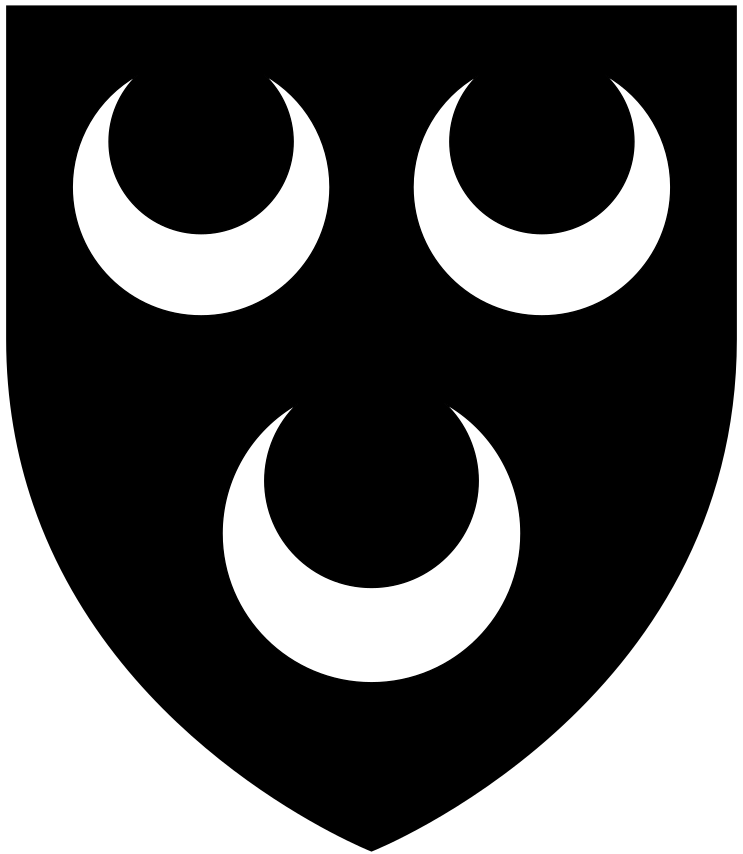
Arms of Harris of Radford: Sable, three crescents argent

Sir Christopher Harris (c. 1553 – 1625) of Radford in the parish of Plymstock in Devon, was a Member of Parliament for Plymouth in Devon in 1584. He was knighted in 1607. He should not be confused with his great-nephew and heir apparent Christopher Harris (d.1623) of Lanrest in the parish of Liskeard in Cornwall, a Member of Parliament for West Looe in Cornwall (1621).

He was a close friend of Admiral Sir Francis Drake, who on one occasion lodged part of his captured treasure at Radford. In partnership with John Hele (died 1608) of Wembury in Devon, serjeant-at-law and MP, Harris acquired the estate of Buckland Abbey in Devon as a seat for Drake. He owned The Armada Service, a set of 31 silver dishes now in the British Museum. His contemporary the Cornwall historian Richard Carew (d.1620) wrote that he: "admitteth no partner in the sweetly tempered mixture of bounty and thrift, gravity and pleasantness, kindness and stoutness, which grace all his actions".

== Origins ==
He was the son and heir of William Harris (born 1504) of Radford, a Member of Parliament for Newport-juxta-Launceston in Cornwall in 1529, by his wife Catherine Trecarrel, a daughter and co-heiress of Henry Trecarrell (alias Esse) of Trecarrell in Cornwall.

== Marriages and children ==
He married twice as follows, but left no surviving children: Firstly to Barbara Arscott (d.1597/8), a daughter of John Arscott of Dunsland in the parish of Bradford (or Cookbury) in Devon. His son by Barbara, namely John Harris, died young and pre-deceased his father, thus Radford passed to his nearest surviving male relative, namely his great-nephew John Harris (c. 1596 – 1648) of Lanrest in Cornwall, MP. Secondly he married his cousin Bridget Grenville (both were descended from Sir Thomas Grenville (d.1513), lord of the manors of Bideford in Devon and of Stowe in the parish of Kilkhampton, Cornwall, Sheriff of Cornwall in 1481 and in 1486), a daughter of Richard Grenville, lord of the manors of Bideford in Devon and of Stowe in the parish of Kilkhampton, Cornwall.

== Succession ==
As he died without surviving children, his heirs became the descendants of his only sister Jane Harris, who in 1562/3 at Menheniot in Cornwall married her cousin John Harris (died 1579) of Lanrest in Cornwall. Her eldest son (and thus heir apparent to his uncle) was John Harris (1564 – June 1623) of Lanrest, Recorder (or Steward) of the Borough of West Looe in Cornwall (established in 1574) and MP for West Looe in Cornwall in 1614. However, as he predeceased his uncle by two years, he did not inherit, nor did his eldest son Christopher II Harris (1590 – November 1623) of Lanrest, a Member of Parliament for West Looe in Cornwall (1621), who also predeceased his great-uncle by two years, having survived his father by only a few months. It was thus Christopher II's younger brother John Harris (c. 1596 – 1648) of Lanrest, MP, who gained the inheritance.

== Sources ==
- Hasler, P. W., biography of "Harris, Christopher (c.1553-1625), of Radford, Devon", published in History of Parliament: House of Commons 1558-1603, ed. P.W. Hasler, 1981
