= Christopher Harris (died 1623) =

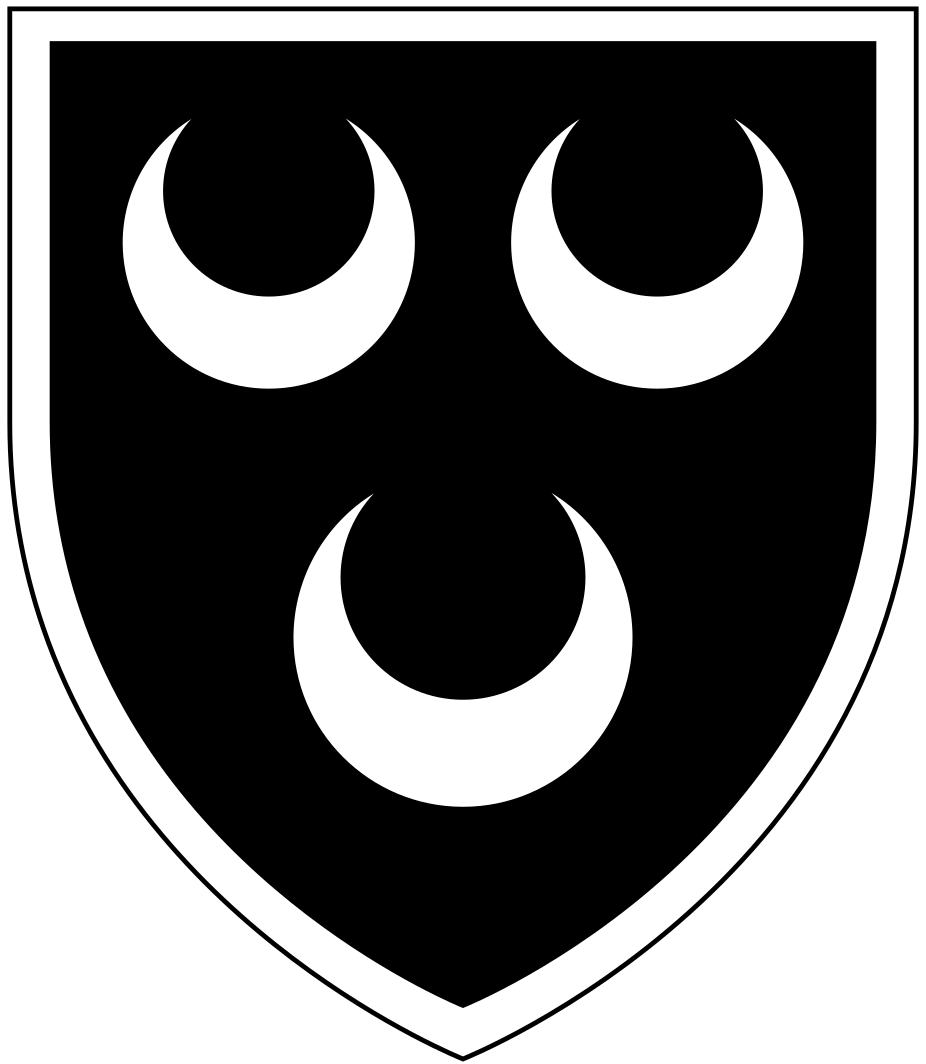
Arms of Harris of Lanrest: Sable, three crescents argent a bordure of the last. These are the arms of Harris of Radford differenced by a bordure argent

Christopher Harris (1590–November 1623) of Lanrest in the parish of Liskeard in Cornwall, was a Member of Parliament for West Looe in Cornwall (1621). He should not be confused with his great-uncle Christopher Harris (c.1553-1625) of Radford in the parish of Plymstock in Devon, MP for Plymouth in 1584, whose heir apparent he was.

== Origins ==
He was the eldest son and heir of John Harris (1564- June 1623) of Lanrest, Recorder of the Borough of West Looe in Cornwall and MP for West Looe in Cornwall in 1614, by his wife Joane Harte, daughter and sole heiress of Robert Harte of Plimston in the parish of Stoke Climsland in Cornwall.

== Career ==
He matriculated at Exeter College, Oxford on 15 November 1605, aged 15 and was awarded BA on 7 July 1608 and MA on 2 July 1611. He was a law student at Lincoln's Inn in 1611. In 1621 he was elected Member of Parliament for West Looe in Cornwall.

== Marriage ==
He married Gertrude Grenville, a daughter of Sir Bernard Grenville (1567-1636), MP, lord of the manors of Bideford in Devon and of Stowe in the parish of Kilkhampton, Cornwall. The marriage was without progeny.

== Death, burial & succession ==
Harris died at the age of 33 and was buried at Plymstock on 27 November 1623. He was succeeded by his younger brother John Harris (c.1596-1648), four times elected MP for Liskeard, who also inherited the estates of their great-uncle Sir Christopher Harris (c.1553-1625), MP for Plymouth in 1584, of Radford in the parish of Plymstock in Devon.

Parliament of England
Preceded by John Harris; Sir Edward Lewkenor	Member of Parliament for West Looe; 1621; With: Heneage Finch	Succeeded by George Mynn; James Bagg
