= Simon Mountford =

Simon Mountford may refer to:

- Sir Simon Mountford (died 1495), MP for Warwickshire, 1463 and supporter of Perkin Warbeck
- Simon Mountford (died 1537/38), MP for Newport (Cornwall), 1529
