= John Harris (died 1677) =

English politician

John Harris (1631 - August 1677) was an English politician who sat in the House of Commons from 1661 to 1677.

Harris was the son of John Harris of Lanrest, Liskeard in Cornwall, and of Radford by Plymstock in Devon, and his wife Elizabeth Johnson of Bonham in Wiltshire who died giving birth to him. His father was MP for Liskeard and supported the King during the Civil War.

Harris's father died in 1649 but in 1653 Harris was required to pay a permanent ten per cent fine, which was levied on the property holdings of all royalist and political opponents. He was imprisoned in Plymouth Castle when a planned uprising was discovered.

Following the Restoration, Harris was elected Member of Parliament for Liskeard in the Cavalier Parliament of 1661, a seat he held until his death in 1677.

He died in 1677. He had married in 1666, Mary, the daughter of John Rashleigh of Menabilly, Cornwall.
