= The Armada Service =

Set of gilded silver dishes

Armada Service
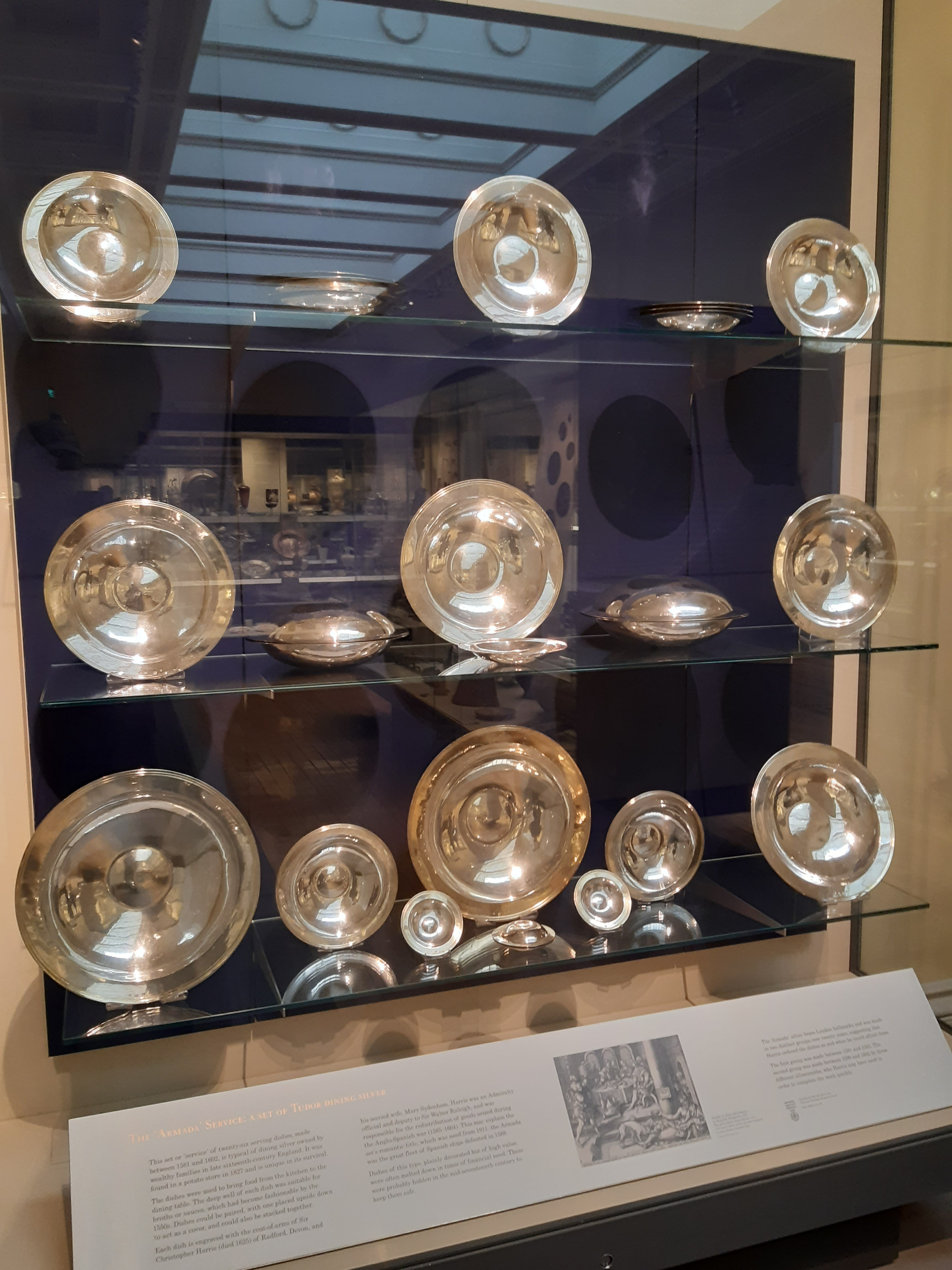
- The Armada Service on display at the British Museum
- Material: Silver
- Size: Diameter 12.1cm (min)
- Created: Late 16th - early 17th Century AD
- Present location: British Museum, London
- Registration: M&ME 1992,6-14,1-26

The Armada Service (alias Tudor Service) is a set of more than 31 gilded silver dishes, dated between 1581 and 1601, formerly owned by Sir Christopher Harris (c. 1553–1625), MP, of Radford House in the parish of Plymstock in Devon, England. Twenty-six of these dishes are now in the collection of the British Museum in London.

== Description ==
The dishes are parcel gilt with reeded rims and are engraved with the arms of Sir Christopher Harris of Radford. The Sherborne Mercury newspaper of Dorset reported on 28 January 1828, that following an "inspection the Herald's office, London, the arms, which are very perfect all the pieces, were those of Sir Christopher Harris, an ancestor of the Harris family of Radford, near Plymouth, quartered with those of his wives, and who lived in the year 1600". The arms of Sydenham are also said to be present, supposedly of one of Harris's wives "Mary Sydenham", who is not however listed in authoritative biographies. Sir Francis Drake did however have a connection with the Sydenham family of Combe Sydenham in Somerset. They bear prominent and large London hallmarks on the upper rims for the years 1581, 1599, 1600 and 1601.

== Provenance ==
The Armada Service was commissioned by Sir Christopher Harris (c. 1553–1625), of Radford in the parish of Plymstock, Devon, a Member of Parliament for Plymouth in Devon in 1584, Vice-Admiral of Devon during the reign of James I and a Commissioner for Booty at Plymouth under Sir Walter Raleigh. He was a close friend of Admiral Sir Francis Drake, who on one occasion lodged part of his captured treasure at Radford. In partnership with John Hele (died 1608) of Wembury in Devon, serjeant-at-law and MP, Harris acquired the estate of Buckland Abbey in Devon as a seat for Drake. During the 16th and 17th centuries amassing silver was usual for wealthy English families. Such collections served two distinct purposes: to increase family prestige and to act as a store of value or investment.

== Discovery ==
During the Civil War (1642–1651) huge amounts of silver were melted down to pay for military supplies and wages, and the silver dishes were buried by the Harris family in Brixham, near to Radford, to avoid being looted by Parliamentary troops. The silver was never subsequently recovered by the Harris family, who remained at Radford until after 1810, but was at last discovered in 1827, when three farm labourers employed by the Splat company of Brixham, discovered them in an agricultural building they were excavating to increase the storage capacity for the company's potatoes. The local newspaper reported that "upwards of 30 dishes" had been found. In June 1911 Mary Codelia Cator sold the dishes at Christie's auctioneers in London for £11,500 .

== Importance ==
The service has been described as "one of the most important groups of English silver to have been found in England." As a set of relatively plain objects, of which the bullion value may have exceeded the artistic worth, this service represents "the unique survival of a type of utilitarian plate which is listed in the inventories of the gentry and aristocracy of the late Tudor and early Stuart periods."

== Nomenclature ==
The nomenclature of the hoard's name is subject to speculation by scholars. It was named by modern scholars the Armada Service in allusion to the Spanish Armada of 1588, a failed attempt by Spain to invade England, as it is believed to have a connection to New World silver captured and pilfered from the Spanish treasure fleet operating at about that time. 31 pieces were "commissioned to mark the conquering of the Spanish naval fleet and used at a dinner thrown" at Harris's seat at Radford. Some modern scholars have suggested a connection to the Madre de Deus (Mother of God), a Portuguese ship captured by the English in 1592. However, Sir Christopher Harris worked for Sir Walter Raleigh in the Admiralty during the Anglo-Spanish War (1585–1604). His acquisition of these dishes at about the same time may suggest that they "represent the profits of his office".

== Subsequent history ==
26 dishes were acquired in July 1992 by the British Museum, when valued at £900,000. In April 2013 an additional silver spice dish from the service was valued at "about £100,000" on the BBC One television show Antiques Roadshow, by Alastair Dickenson, the programme’s silver expert. At an auction at Lawrence's of Crewkerne in Somerset, Dickenson acquired for a client two related pieces for £135,000, which had been exported to the southern United States before being repatriated to England. The present location of these "three" (sic) pieces is unknown.

== See also ==
- Art theft
- Household silver or silverware
- Treasure trove
