= Hooe, Plymouth =

Suburb of Plymouth, Devon

Coordinates: 50.3525°N 4.112778°W

Hooe
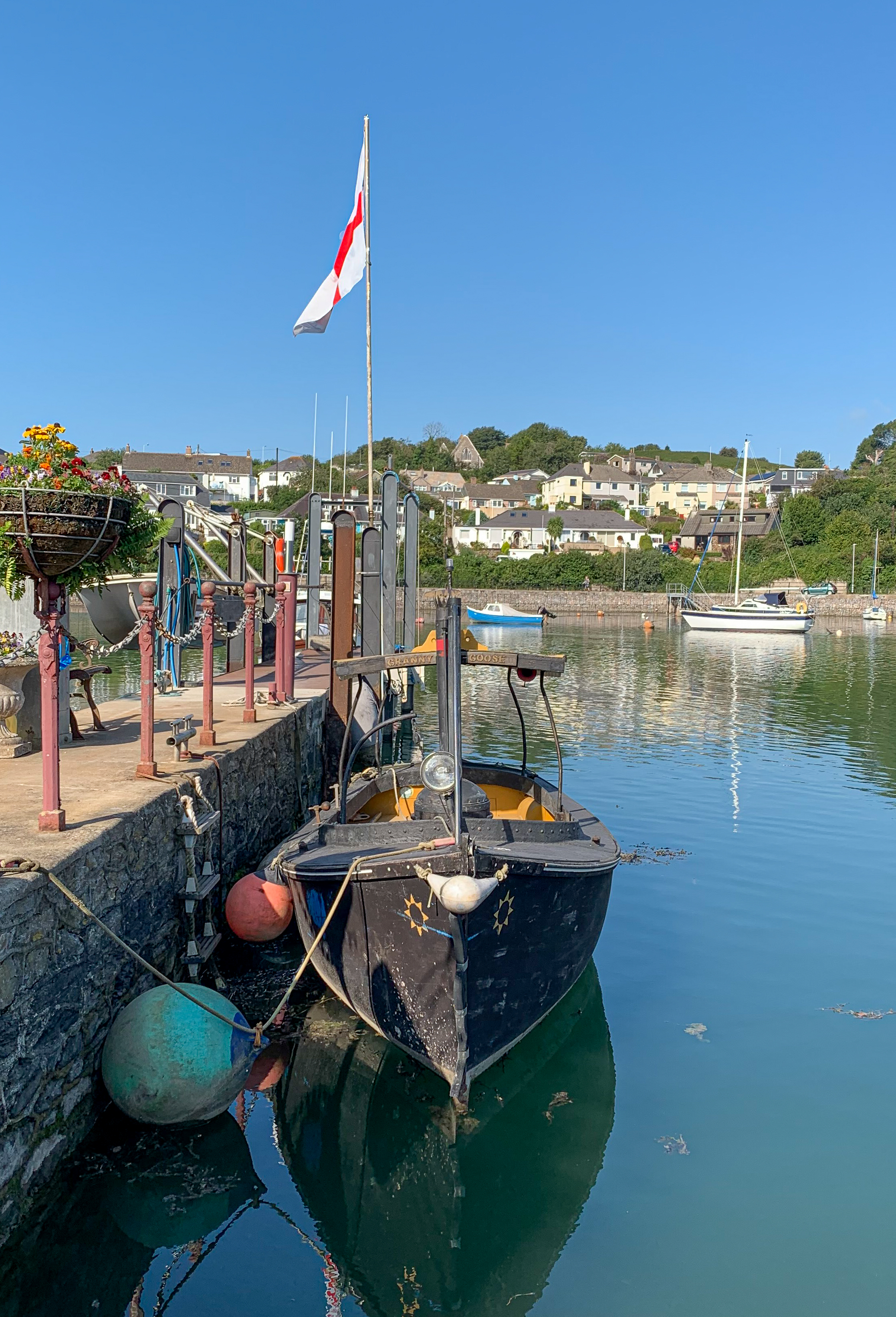
- Hooe Lake as seen from Yonder St

- Location within Devon
- Unitary authority: Plymouth
- Ceremonial county: Devon
- Region: South West
- Country: England
- Sovereign state: United Kingdom
- Post town: PLYMOUTH
- Postcode district: PL9 9xx
- Dialling code: 01752
- Police: Devon and Cornwall
- Fire: Devon and Somerset
- Ambulance: South Western

Hooe is a suburb of Plymstock, Plymouth in the English county of Devon.

== History ==
Hooe was built over the site of the estate of Radford, the family seat of the Harris family.

Wilson's Imperial Gazetteer of England and Wales from 1870 to 1872 describes Hooe as follows:

A village and a chapelry in Plymstock parish, Devon. The village stands on the coast, 3 miles SE of Plymouth.—The chapelry was constituted in 1856; and its post town is Plymouth. Pop., 1082. Houses, 234. The living is a p. curacy in the diocese of Exeter. Value, £79. Patron, Lady Rogers.

— John Marius Wilson, Imperial Gazetteer of England and Wales, p. 982

== Geography ==
Hooe is situated adjacent to the estuary of the River Plym. It consists of two areas, Higher Hooe and Lower Hooe. Lower Hooe includes the area near Hooe Lake and the old barn from the former Hooe Barton Farm which was demolished in 1969.

Areas around Hooe include Radford to the east, Turnchapel to the north-west, and Jennycliff Bay to the west. Hooe has woodland and farmland to the south.

== Present day ==
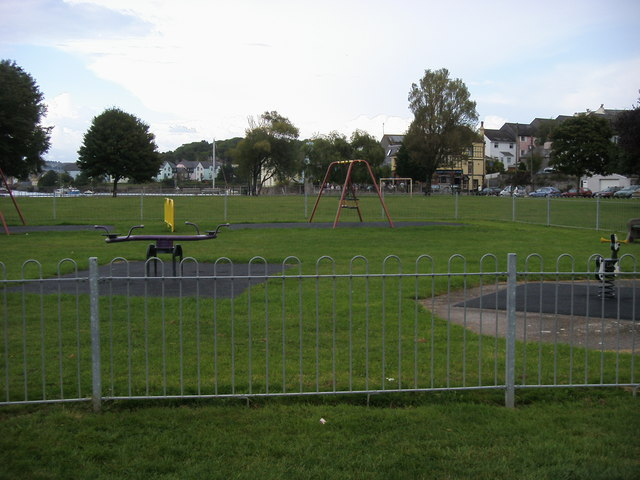
Park by Hooe Road

Hooe has a park, small garage, a newsagent, a small grocery store, an Indian takeaway, a Chinese takeaway, a pasty shop and a post office. There is also Hooe Primary School in Lower Hooe, and two pubs, The Royal Oak and The Victoria.

There are five quarries situated around Hooe Lake, all disused and in disrepair. The largest, Hooe Lake Quarry, was used to store fuel by the Ministry of Defence until the 1970s after its useful life as a limestone quarry.

Adjacent to the lake at the river end of the estuary are the remains of the old Turnchapel Branch swing bridge used for trains to access Turnchapel from the Oreston side from 1897. It was closed in the 20th century shortly after the Second World War. Since then it has remained in a state of disrepair. The bridge itself has now gone but the structure still remains.

At one end of the dam separating the freshwater Radford Lake from tidal Hooe Lake sits an early 19th-century folly known as Radford Castle.
