= Radford, Plymstock =

Historic manor in Devon, England

Coordinates: 50.3523°N 4.1018°W

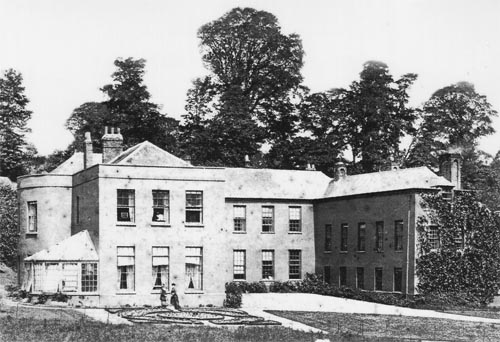
Radford House, south and west fronts and entrance courtyard, photograph c.1880. Demolished 1937

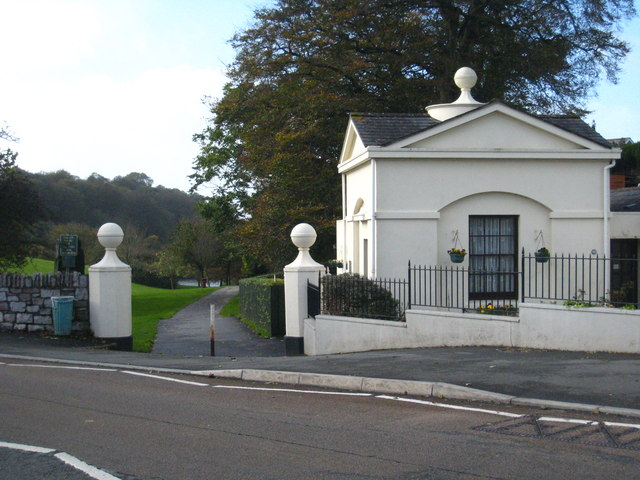
Early 19th century gate-lodge at the entrance drive to the demolished Radford House, with Radford Park and Lake beyond

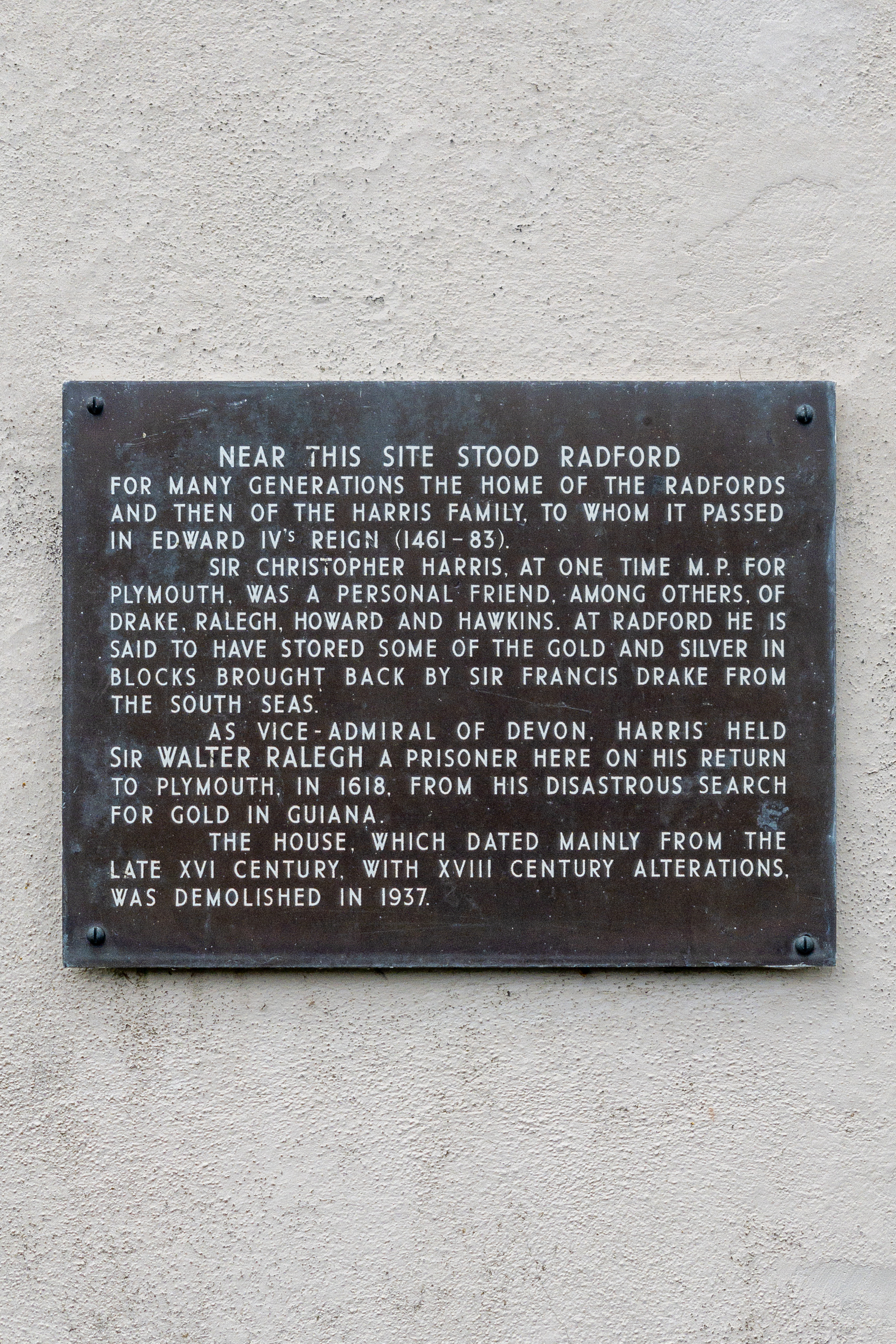
Plaque beside the demolished Radford House

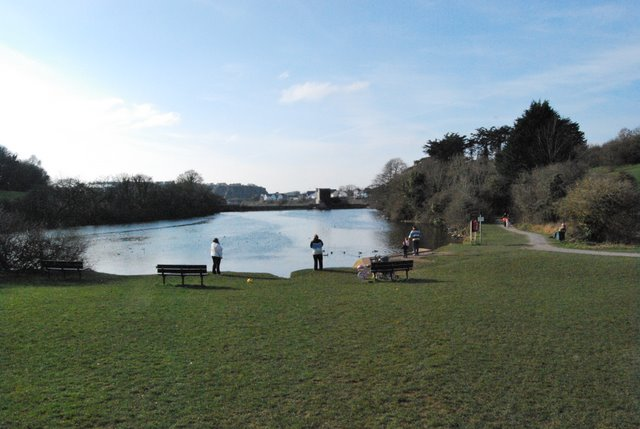
Radford Lake in 2009

Radford in the parish of Plymstock in Devon is a historic manor and the oldest recorded seat of the prominent Harris family. It is today a suburb of the City of Plymouth. The 16th century manor house of the Harris family was remodelled in the 18th century and was demolished in 1937. However, various traces of the estate remain, including most notably the deerpark, now a public amenity known as Radford Park, with its large lake, an early 19th century gate-lodge at the entrance drive to the former mansion house, with gatepiers, on Radford Park Road, a bridge and boathouse with follies of a sham castle and another sham-ruin.

== Descent of the manor ==
=== le Abbé ===
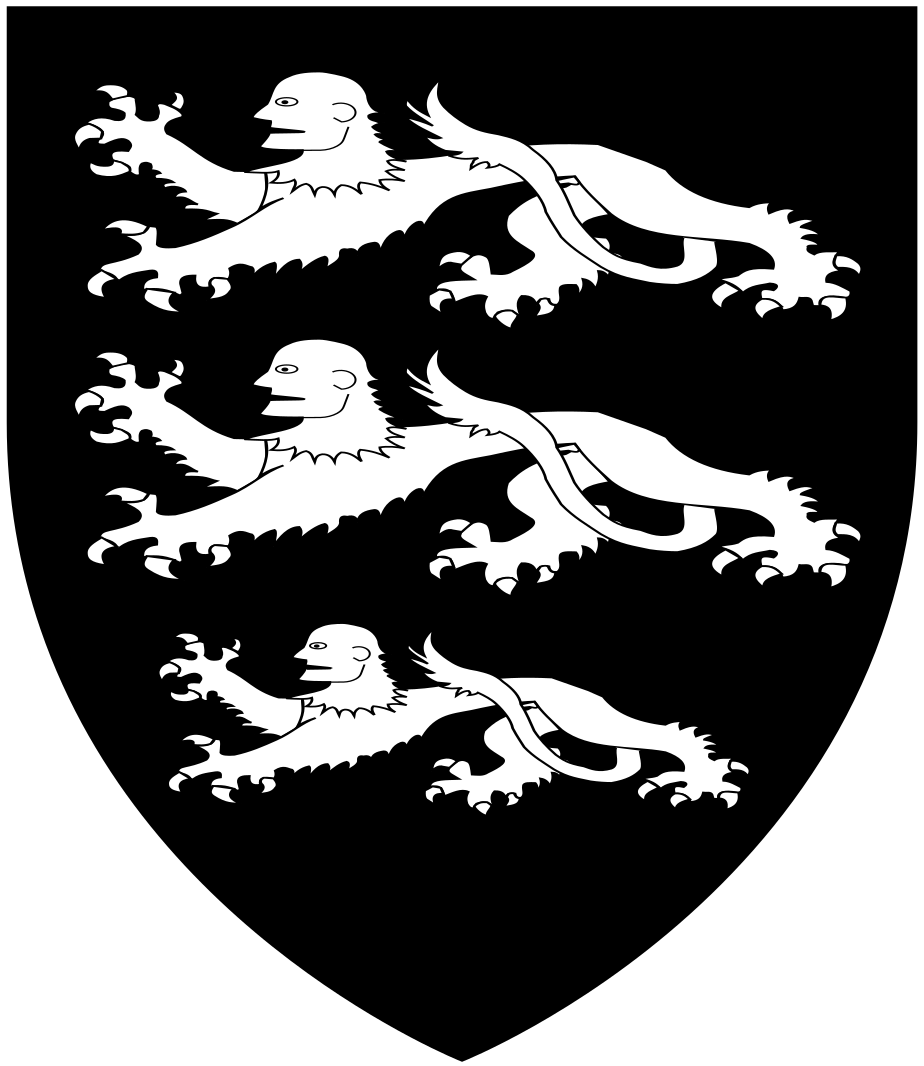
Arms of Radford of Radford: Sable, three lampagoes passant coward in pale argent

In 1242 Radford was held by William le Abbé (in English "Abbot"). Radford descended to his son Henry le Abbé of Alsemston, and then to Walter le Abbé, whose posterity, having adopted the surname de Radford remained seated at Radford for several generations.

=== de Radford (le Abbé) ===
The succession of the le Abbé family at Radford, under the newly adopted surname of de Radford, commenced with Robert de Radford who was succeeded by his son Henry de Radford, who married a certain Matild by whom he had a son Walter de Radford.

=== Harris ===
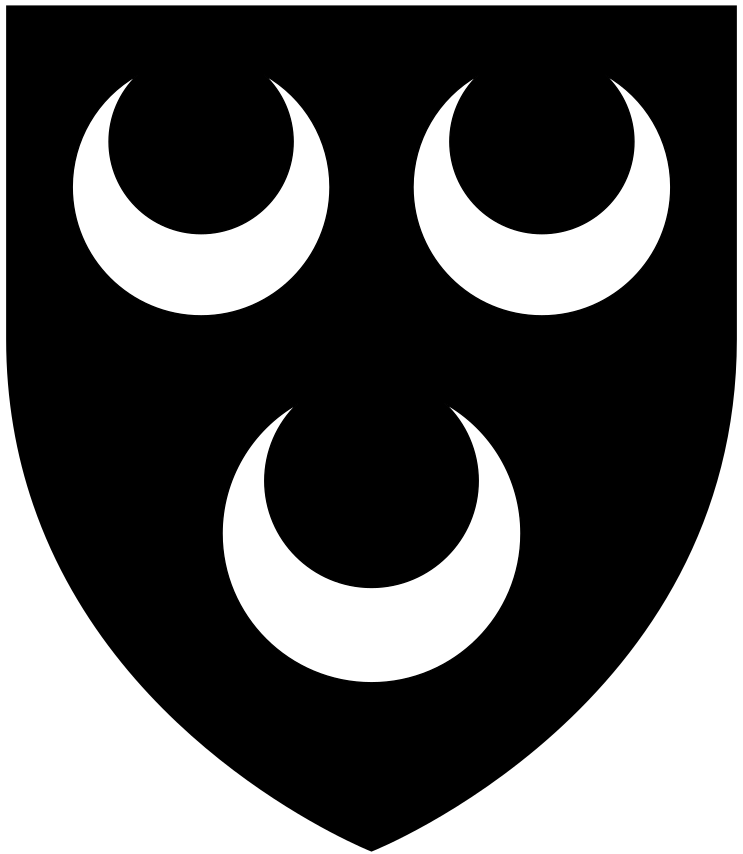
Arms of Harris of Radford: Sable, three crescents argent

Radford is the earliest recorded seat of the prominent Harris family. The earliest member of this family recorded by the Devon historian Pole (died 1635) is John I Harris, resident there during the reign of King Henry VI (1422–1461). He was followed by five Johns, namely John II Harris, John III Harris, who had two sons, John IV Harris (died 1485), the eldest son, who inherited Radford, and John V Harris, second son who married the daughter and heiress of the de Stone family of Stone in the parish of Lifton in Devon and founded the prominent junior branch of Harris of Hayne in the parish of Stowford in Devon, about 22 miles north-west of Radford. The subsequent descent of Radford was as follows:

==== Francis Harris (1475–1509) ====
Francis Harris (1475–1509), who married Phillipa Grenville (died 1524), a daughter of Sir Thomas Grenville (died 1513), lord of the manors of Bideford in Devon and of Stowe in the parish of Kilkhampton, Cornwall, Sheriff of Cornwall in 1481 and in 1486. She survived her husband and remarried to Humphry Arundell of Lanherne, Cornwall, younger brother of Sir John Arundell (1474–1545), her brother-in-law.

==== William Harris (born 1504) ====
William Harris (born 1504) of Radford, son, a Member of Parliament for Newport-juxta-Launceston in Cornwall in 1529. At some time before June 1527, he married Catherine Trecarrel, a daughter and co-heiress of Henry Trecarrell (alias Esse) of Trecarrell in Cornwall.

==== Sir Christopher Harris (c. 1553 – 1625) ====
Sir Christopher Harris (c. 1553 – 1625) of Radford, son, a Member of Parliament for Plymouth in 1584, knighted in 1607. He was a close friend of Admiral Sir Frances Drake, who on one occasion lodged part of his captured treasure at Radford. In partnership with John Hele (died 1608) of Wembury in Devon, serjeant-at-law and MP, Harris acquired the estate of Buckland Abbey in Devon as a seat for Drake. He owned the Armada Service, a set of 31 silver dishes now in the British Museum. He married Barbara Arscott (d.1597/8), a daughter of John Arscott of Dunsland in the parish of Bradford (or Cookbury) in Devon. His son John Harris died young and pre-deceased his father, thus Radford passed to the closest living male descendant of his only sister Jane Harris, namely his great nephew John Harris (c. 1596 – 1648) of Lanrest in Cornwall, four times elected MP for Liskeard, Cornwall.

The descent from his sister was as follows:

Jane Harris in 1562/3, at Menheniot in Cornwall, married her cousin John Harris (d.1579) of Lanrest in Cornwall. Her eldest son (and thus heir apparent to his uncle) was John Harris (1564 – June 1623) of Lanrest, Recorder (or Steward) of the Borough of West Looe in Cornwall ( established in 1574) and MP for West Looe in Cornwall in 1614. However, as he predeceased his uncle by two years, he did not inherit, nor did his eldest son Christopher II Harris (1590 – November 1623) of Lanrest, a Member of Parliament for West Looe in Cornwall (1621), who also predeceased his great-uncle by two years, having survived his father by only a few months. It was thus Christopher II's younger brother John Harris (c. 1596 – 1648) of Lanrest, MP, who gained the inheritance.

==== John Harris (c. 1596 – 1648) ====
John Harris (c. 1596 – 1648) of Lanrest in Cornwall and of Radford, great-nephew and heir. He was elected four times as a Member of Parliament for Liskeard in Cornwall, between 1628 and 1644 and supported the Royalist side in the English Civil War. In 1630 he married Elizabeth Johnson (died 1637), a daughter of Emorb Johnson of Bridge in the parish of South Petherton in Somerset and of Bonham in Wiltshire.

==== John Harris (died 1677) ====
John Harris (died 1677) of Radford, eldest son, a Member of Parliament for Liskeard after 1660 and the Restoration of the Monarchy. He married Mary Rashleigh, a daughter of John Rashleigh of Menabilly in Cornwall.

==== John Harris ====
John Harris of Radford, son, who married Amy Sawle, a daughter of Joseph Sawle of Penrice in Cornwall.

==== John Harris ====
John Harris, son, who married Elizabeth Lampen, a daughter of Nicholas Lampen of Holwell in the parish of Stoke Climsland, Devon. His 3rd son was Christopher Harris who married Susanna Freke, a daughter of Francis Freke. In 1777 Christopher Harris built a new residence for himself near Radford, in the village of Hooe, also the parish of Plymstock, named Bellevue, according to Pevsner "a very elegant small [sic] mansion". It is now a grade II* listed building known as Hooe Manor, on Bellevue Road, sub-divided into five flats. Christopher Harris left two daughters and co-heiresses, Susannah Harris the wife of Thomas Mills of Great Saxam in Suffolk, and Anne Harris (1772–1849), heiress of Bellevue and wife of Thomas Hillersdon Bulteel I "of Bellevue", who was a partner in the Naval Bank in nearby Plymouth, Devon, founded in 1774. The couple had ten children, a younger one of whom was the radical priest Henry Bellenden Bulteel (1800-1866). The eldest son was Thomas Hillersdon Bulteel II (1798-1878) of Bellevue, banker, who married Caroline Louisa Harris, heiress of Radford. Their son was Thomas Bulteel of Radford, who married Margaret Cork.

==== John Harris (d.1778) ====
John Harris (d.1778) of Radford, son of John Harris and Elizabeth Lampen. He died without progeny when his heir became his nephew John Harris (d.1817).

==== John Harris (d.1817) ====
John Harris (d.1817) of Radford, nephew. He was the eldest son and heir of Lampen Harris (2nd son of John Harris and Elizabeth Lampen) by his wife Elizabeth Spry, a daughter of Joseph Spry. His sister Elizabeth Harris married Vice-Admiral John Manley. He was one of the founding partners of the Naval Bank, established in 1773 in Market Place, Plymouth. He married Catharine Bulteel, a sister of John II Bulteel (1763–1837) of Flete in the parish of Holbeton, Devon, and an aunt of John Crocker Bulteel (1793–1843) a Whig MP for South Devon 1832-4 and Sheriff of Devon in 1841. By his wife he had six sons and five daughters.

In 1793 Rev. John Swete visited Radford on one of his Picturesque Tours and recorded in his Travel Journal:

"The gate leading in to Radford being opposite the lane, I past through it in the hope of being gratified with a sight of an edifice which had been the mansion house of the Harrises from the time of Edward the fourth to the present day - in this however I was disappointed, for neither house or grounds answer'd my expectations. The former was, in what I look upon in the country the worst stile of building, a front of but little extent with two deep projecting wings, towards the south however one of these wings extended itself and open'd towards a steep acclivity — nor in the latter was there any thing striking: it consisted of a fertile meadow, which was bounded on every quarter by high hills. The situation was a shelter'd one and that, as I have already noticed, was a circumstance which in former times overbalanc'd the weaker pretensions of beauty of prospect".

==== Thomas Harris ====
The occupant of Radford in the 1841 census was Thomas Harris (born 1796), a banker.

==== Col. Harry Bulteel Harris ====
The occupant of Radford in the 1841 census was Col. Harry Bulteel Harris, a partner in the Naval Bank in 1845/6, and his wife Anne (born 1795). In 1818 he was Deputy Adjutant-General of Nova Scotia serving under the governorship of Lt-Gen George Ramsay, 9th Earl of Dalhousie. In 1834 he was created a Knight of the Royal Hanoverian Guelphic Order. In 1838 he retired as Lt-Col of the 93rd Regiment of Foot. He was resident at Radford in the 1851 census.

=== Bulteel ===
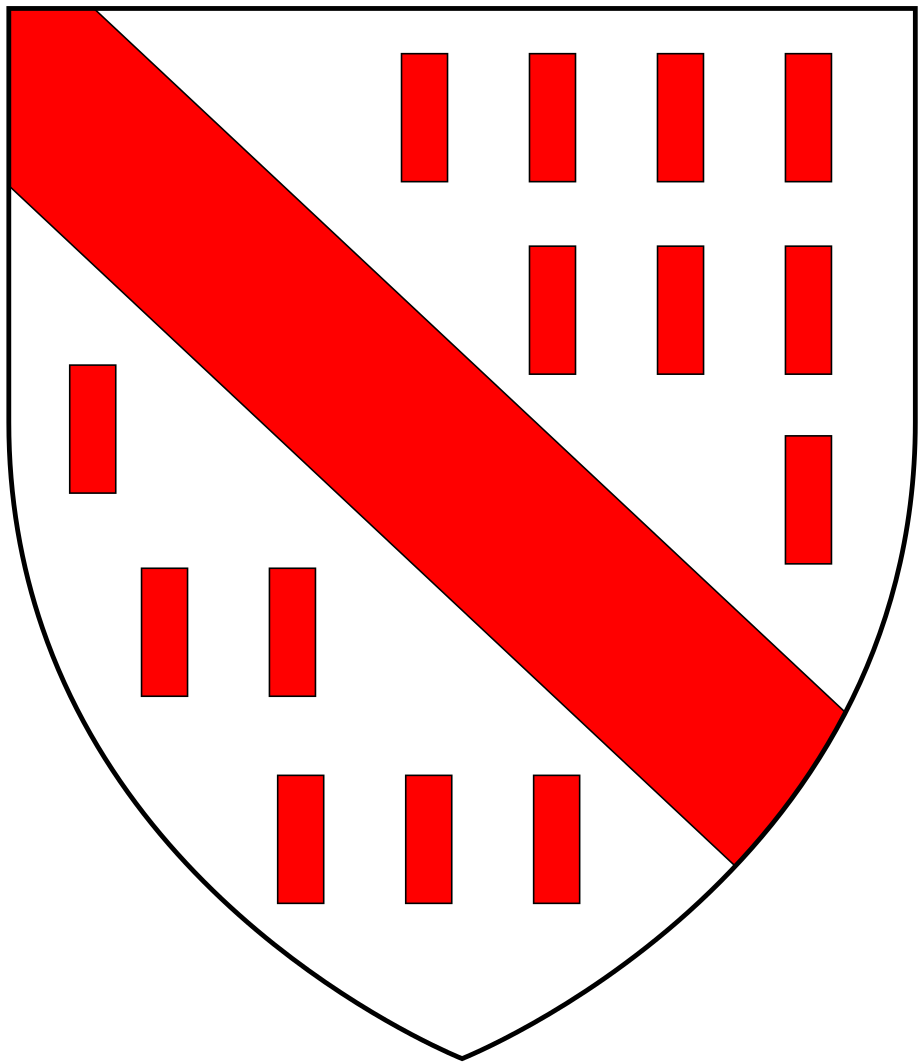
Arms of Bulteel: Argent biletée gules, a bend of the last

Radford was later inherited by a branch of the Bulteel family of Flete in the parish of Holbeton, Devon, which changed its name to Harris-Bulteel. Their tenure ended in debt, fraud and imprisonment. The earliest recorded ancestor of the Bulteel family in England is Samuel Bulteel (died 1682) of Tavistock in Devon, a Huguenot refugee from France, whose son was James Bulteel (1676–1757) of Tavistock, MP for Tavistock 1703-8 and 1711–15, who married Mary Crocker, daughter and heiress of Courtenay Crocker (died 1740), MP, of Lyneham in the parish of Yealmpton, Devon, the last male of the senior branch of the ancient Crocker family. Another possible relative was John Bulteel (died 1669), MP for Lostwithiel, Cornwall in 1661 and 1669, a friend of Samuel Pepys and secretary to Edward Hyde, 1st Earl of Clarendon, and cousin of John Bulteel the writer and translator. James Bulteel inherited the estate of Fleet (alias Fleet Damarell), one of the finest estates in Devon, under the will of Richard Hele (died 1709) of Flete, who was no blood relation. James's son was John Bulteel (1733–1801), who in 1757 purchased the estate of Membland, in the parish of Holbeton. Membland, in about 1877, and the manor of Revelstoke were purchased by Edward Baring (1828–1897), who in 1885 was elevated to the peerage as "Baron Revelstoke of Membland". He was senior partner of Barings Bank, which had originated in nearby Exeter, Devon. In 1861 he had married Louisa Emily Charlotte Bulteel (died 1892), a daughter of John Crocker Bulteel (1793–1843) of Fleet, Holbeton, the adjoining estate, MP for South Devon 1832–4 and Sheriff of Devon in 1841. Thus the two banking dynasties of Baring and Bulteel, both founded in Devonshire and both destined for ignominious collapse, became linked.

==== Thomas Bulteel (born 1838) ====
The occupant of Radford in the 1881 and 1891 censuses was Thomas Bulteel (born 1838), a banker and a partner in the Naval Bank, formerly of 2 Wingfield Villas, Stoke Damerell, where he had resided in 1861 and 1871 with his family and six servants. His wife was Margaret Cork (born 1839). His eldest son was Percy Francis Bulteel (1865-1907), who married Julia Pine-Coffin, of that prominent family long seated at Portledge in the parish of Alwington, North Devon. Percy retired from partnership in "Harris, Bulteel & Co" (the Naval Bank) in 1898, when the bank had an undisclosed financial deficiency of £9,295 leaving just two partners remaining: his father Thomas Bulteel and a new partner to replace him, Mackworth Praed Parker (1865-1926) of Moor Cross, Ivybridge, a grandson of Admiral of the Fleet Sir William Parker, 1st Baronet, of Harburn. From the date of Percy Bulteel's retirement the bank began to be operated recklessly which 16 years later led to its collapse and the destruction of the family's wealth (see below).

==== Frederick Thomas Bulteel (born 1880) ====
Frederick Thomas Bulteel (born 1880) of Radford, second son of Thomas Bulteel. In 1914 he was the owner of Radford and a partner in the "Harris, Bulteel & Co" (alias Naval Bank) (together with Mackworth Praed Parker) when it became insolvent, having attempted to defraud its customers. In August 1914 the bank suspended payments and executed a deed of arrangement with trustees. Arrangements were made whereby Lloyds Bank "will be prepared to give all possible banking facilities to customers". In November 1915 the two partners were charged with fraud. On 3 November 1915 the Llais Llafur Labour Voice newspaper of Wales reported as follows:

"PLYMOUTH BANK FAILURE. GRAVE CHARGES AGAINST PARTNERS. Arising out of the failure of the Naval Bank, Plymouth, the two surviving partners, Mackworth Praed Parker and Frederick Thomas Bulteel, were charged at Plymouth on Tuesday with conspiracy to obtain credit to the amount of £580,586 by fraud and with conspiracy to obtain from the bank's customers large sums by false pretences. Bulteel was separately charged with converting £ 23,191 to his own use. For the prosecution it was stated that for six years the defendants continued to invite deposits knowing the bank to be hopelessly insolvent, and, it was alleged, deliberate mis-representation and concealment were resorted to freely. From 1998 to 1907 the bank's deficiency rose from £9,295 to £ 111,000. By 1913 the bank's losses amounted to £146,000. Bulteel had drawn over £25,000 in salary and overdrafts. The defendants endeavoured to maintain public confidence in an insolvent concern by improving the premises, by opening new branches, and by living as men of great wealth and prosperity. The hearing was adjourned".

Frederick Thomas Bulteel was imprisoned for six months. The insolvent bank was acquired by Lloyds Bank. "Frederick Thomas Bulteel" was killed in action on 7 November 1918 during World War I, serving as a lance corporal in the 47th Anti-Aircraft Searchlight Section, Royal Engineers, and was buried in Abbeville Communal Cemetery Extension, Somme, France. He was resident in the parish of Melplash in Dorset and is named on the war memorial in the parish church, Christ Church. He married a certain Edith, of Roselands in the parish of Heavitree, near Exeter, Devon.

With the Bulteel's family fortune lost, Radford was sold in 1917 by order of the Trustee in Bankruptcy. The sales particulars of the estate listed Radford House; Hooe Manor (also Belle Vue); Thorn Cottage (in 1851 the seat of Christopher Harris (born 1790), banker, a partner in the Naval Bank); 1 and 2 Furzehatt Villas; farms Higher Goosewell, Lower Goosewell, Barn Farm, Radford Farm; and unsold parts of Buenos Ayres [sic] Building Estate; a total of 602 acres. The purchaser was William Mitchell (1861–1930) The longest-surviving of the sons of Thomas Bulteel of Radford was Hillersden Bulteel (1867-1950), a civil engineer. The Hillersdon family was an ancient gentry family formerly seated at the manor of Membland, later a Bulteel seat.

=== Mitchell ===
==== William Mitchell (1861–1930) ====
Radford was purchased in 1917 for £11,000 by William ("Billy") A. Mitchell (1861–1930) of Rockville Park, Plymstock, a prominent local corn miller and landowner known as the "Uncrowned King of Plymstock". He let the mansion house to tenants who included Col. Parker and Mrs Jarrett-Bell (widow of the Director of HM Royal Dockyard, Devonport). His last tenants were a married couple formerly employed by him to keep the estate lodge, who later conducted guided tours around the house "enlivened with tales of treasure and tunnels and who probably are most responsible for the legends".

Mitchell died of a heart attack whilst addressing Devon County Council in Exeter Castle. Although much of his wealth was donated to charities, Radford was inherited by trustees (his mother and a certain Mr Everson) for his 15-year-old son, W.A. Gordon Mitchell (1915–1968).

==== W.A. Gordon Mitchell (1915–1968) ====
Following his inheritance, W.A. Gordon Mitchell (1915–1968) received professional advice that the house was in a dilapidated state and was considered beyond economic repair. Many of the internal fittings and fixtures had been looted or vandalised. The Western Morning News newspaper of 27 July 1935 described the house as "a rambling old ruin…falling into a state of irreparable dilapidation…of such a size that no modern landowner would purchase it for his own use…Recently intruders have broken into the house and have damaged the walls and mirrors in an attempt to take away some of the more valuable fittings". Having exhausted all possibilities of saving the structure, in 1937 a team of seven men was employed to demolish the house, which was accomplished in six days, leaving only the gardens, lodges, farms and cottages intact. A modern house, containing a large Elizabethan granite fireplace lintel from the dining room of the old house, was built on the higher end of the estate in the late 1940s, and was named "Radford House". Much of the parkland was sold for housing development, although as the press then reported: "development…will be controlled, and the estate of fine treelands, reaching down to Radford Lake, with the old abbeys, will be preserved intact". In 1956 Gordon Mitchell conveyed the lodges, lake and much of the northern side of the deerpark to Plympton Council for recreational use by the public, which remains largely intact today. In 1960 he sold the remainder for housing development.
