= Eikonoklastes =

1649 book by John Milton

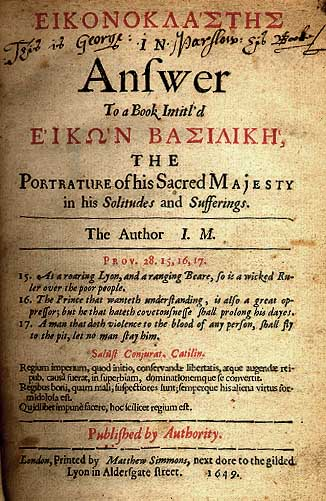
Title page of Eikonoklastes.

Eikonoklastes (from the Greek εἰκονοκλάστης, "iconoclast") is a book by the English poet and polemicist John Milton, published in October 1649. In it he provides a justification for the execution of Charles I, which had taken place on 30 January 1649. The book's title is taken from the Greek, and means "Iconoclast" or "breaker of the icon", and refers to Eikon Basilike, a Royalist (Cavalier) propaganda work. The translation of Eikon Basilike is "icon of the King"; it was published immediately after the execution. Milton's book is therefore usually seen as Parliamentarian (Roundhead) propaganda, explicitly designed to counter the Royalist arguments.

The book was issued in two versions in October 1649, in the English language, and was enlarged in 1650. It was quite soon translated into Latin and French. In 1651 a reply appeared, Eikon Aklastos ("the icon unbroken"). It was written by Joseph Jane, involved in royalist organisation. This book was the first work by Milton to be at all widely read. The public sentiment still supported Charles I, but the tract was able to appeal to a larger audience than many of Milton's previous works.

After the English Restoration of 1660, Milton and other republicans faced a vindictive new Government, and Eikonoklastes was said to have justified regicides. The Act of Oblivion was enacted on 29 August 1660, and Milton was not among those who were listed to suffer the death penalty for their part in Charles I's execution. On the other hand, a proclamation by Charles II of England demanded for Eikonoklastes and Defensio pro Populo Anglicano to be burned. The works were soon after burned in public by the public hangman. This did not stop the work attracting readers, and there was a new edition in 1690 after the Glorious Revolution.

== Background ==
Milton was commissioned to write Eikonoklastes as a response to Charles I's supposed Eikon Basilike (1649). The tract was intended to be the official argument by the Commonwealth government.

Eikon Basilike was published just after Charles I's execution, and the work portrayed him as a martyr. The piece was written with straightforward political aims, to stir up popular sentiment in support of the former monarch and to undermine the control of the Commonwealth government. The work proved so popular that there were 35 editions produced that year. Milton's approach was different from that of Eikon Basilike, which may have in fact been a composite work with John Gauden involved in ghostwriting: instead of appealing to popular sentiment, Milton's work was closely argued and tried to meet each of the points in the Eikon.

Milton believed, certainly, that the Eikon Basilike created a false idol and he wanted to destroy it with truth. Eikonoklastes, titled Eikonolastes in Answer to a Book Intitl'd Eikon Basilike, The Portrature of his Sacred Majesty in his Solitudes and Sufferings, was issued in two versions in October 1649, in English, and was enlarged in 1650. It was quite soon translated into Latin and French. In 1651 a reply appeared, Eikon Aklastos ("the icon unbroken"). It was written by Joseph Jane, involved in royalist organisation.

== Tract ==
Milton begins his work by mentioning that he was commissioned to write Eikonoklastes and that he did such for the good of the Commonwealth: "I take it on me as a work assign'd rather, then by me cho'n or affected". The central argument of Eikonoklastes involves the tyranny inherent in all monarchies, and Milton attacks the idea put forth by Charles I that the liberty of individuals consists "in the enjoyment of the fruits of our industry, and the benefit of those Laws to which we our selves have consented". Milton's response is to point out how such a definition cannot actually separate different kinds of governments:

First, for in the injoyment of those fruits, which our industry and labours have made our own upon our own, what Privilege is that, above what the Turks, Jewes, and Mores enjoy under the Turkish Monarchy? For without that kind of Justice, which is also in Argiers, among Theevs and Pirates between themselves, no kind of Government, no Societie, just or unjust could stand; no combination or conspiracy could stick together. We expect therfore something more, that must distinguish free Government from slavish

To Milton, Charles I was able to coerce the English people and actually made them his slaves, especially through his veto power which established him "as the transcendent and ultimat Law above all our Laws; and to rule us forcibly by Laws to which we ourselves did not consent".

Milton attacks Charles I's rhetorical flourishes throughout Eikon Basilike, and he claims that "the whole Book might perhaps be intended a peece of Poetrie". Milton criticises every aspect of Eikon Basilike to the point that when Charles I claims that he was with gentlemen, Milton responds "Gentlemen indeed; the ragged Infantrie of Stewes and Brothels". However, the criticism was not limited to just style and images. In response to Charles I coining the term "demagogue", Milton claims that the word is an attack on the English language and the English people: "the affrightment of this Goblin word; for the King by his leave cannot coine English as he could Money, to be current".

In the second edition, Milton expanded his claim that the supporters of Charles I were an "inconstant, irrational, and Image-doting rabble" to declare:

that like a credulous and hapless herd, begott'n to servility, and inchanted with these popular institutes of Tyranny, subscrib'd with a new device of the Kings Picture at his praiers, hold out both thir eares with such delight and ravishment to be stigmatiz'd and board through in witness of thir own voluntary and beloved baseness.

Milton also altered an epigraph by Sallust on the title page that comes from Gaius Memmius's speech in Bellum Iugurthinum. The speech penned by Sallust for Memmius describes various abuses, and is used to argue that all monarchs are corrupt. In addition to a discussion of Charles I and monarchy, Milton adds a response to Edward Hyde, 1st Earl of Clarendon, who wrote The History of the Rebellion and Civil Wars.

== Themes ==
Milton argues that in all monarchical governments there is potential for enslaving the population, which was an argument he previously relied on in his The Tenure of Kings and Magistrates. Milton's view of freedom was not limited to just having the right to property, but to be free from the potential of arbitrary domination by a monarch. Monarchy was not the only subject of importance to Milton within Eikonoklastes; Milton also defended presbyterian and republican principles, claiming that reformation cannot accept episcopal or monarchical control. Instead, a presbyterian-based religion was the only proper type of religion. To John T. Shawcross, Milton's experience while writing the piece, along with the two Defences "supplied the experience with the world, that dark world and wide, that seems to have been needed for Milton to move beyond the defiant to degrees of understanding, if not acceptance, of humankind."

Starting in 1649, Milton began to connect his various prose publications with the plan of a future epic to be composed, and Eikonoklastes was one such work. As such, there are multiple parallels between the actions of Charles I's monarchy and Satan's rule in hell found within Paradise Lost. The description of a rise of antichristian monarchs near the end of Eikonoklastes declares that such individuals rely on an ambiguous language to gain power. Likewise, Milton's Satan relies on the same kind of rhetoric. Likewise, the deviant followers of Charles I are connected to demons in hell who drink and blaspheme.

== Critical review ==
The work failed: it is the general view that Milton's work did not succeed, at least in terms of rebutting the Eikon Basilike. On the other hand, scholars still debate exactly what the polemic intention of Milton's work was. This book was the first work by Milton to be at all widely read. Public sentiment still supported Charles I, but the tract was able to appeal to a larger audience than many of Milton's previous works.

After the English Restoration of 1660, Milton and other republicans faced a vindictive new Government, and Eikonoklastes was said to have justified regicides. The Act of Oblivion was enacted on 29 August 1660, and Milton was not among those who were listed to suffer the death penalty for their part in Charles I's execution. On the other hand, a proclamation by Charles II of England demanded that Eikonoklastes and Defensio pro Populo Anglicano be burned. The works were soon after burned in public by the public hangman. This did not stop the work attracting readers, and there was a new edition in 1690 after the Glorious Revolution.
