= William Jane =

English academic and Anglican clergyman

William Jane (1645–1707) was an English academic and clergyman, Regius Professor of Divinity at Oxford from 1680.

== Life ==
The son of Joseph Jane, he was born at Liskeard, Cornwall, where he was baptised on 22 October 1645. He was educated at Westminster School, elected student of Christ Church, Oxford, in 1660, and graduated B.A. in June 1664, M.A. in 1667, and D.D. in November 1674. After his ordination he was appointed lecturer at Carfax Church, Oxford.

He attracted the notice of Henry Compton, who became canon of Christ Church in 1669, and when Compton was created bishop of Oxford in 1674 he chose Jane to preach the sermon at his consecration, and appointed him one of his chaplains. In 1678 he was made canon of Christ Church, and was further presented by Compton, then bishop of London, to the rectory of Wennington, Essex. In 1679 the prebendal stall of Chamberlainswood in St. Paul's Cathedral and the archdeaconry of Middlesex were conferred on him. In May 1680 he was made regius professor of divinity at Oxford. In July 1683 he framed the Oxford declaration in favour of passive obedience.

He received the deanery of Gloucester, in which he was installed on 6 June 1685. He resigned the archdeaconry of Middlesex in 1686, but kept his canonries of Christ Church and St. Paul's till his death. In November 1686 Jane was summoned to represent the Church of England in a discussion which was held with some Roman Catholic divines in the presence of James II, with a view to the conversion of the Earl of Rochester. Jane did not take much part in the disputation, which was mostly left to Rochester himself. He shortly changed his opinion about passive obedience, and when James II's cause was hopeless, Jane sought William of Orange at Hungerford, and assured him of the support of the university of Oxford, hinting at his willingness to accept the vacant bishopric of Oxford. The fact that the framer of the Oxford declaration should be so ready to disown its principles occasioned a number of epigrams.

He was put on a commission of divines who were appointed, at the suggestion of John Tillotson and Gilbert Burnet, to revise the prayer-book, with a view to the comprehension of dissenters, which William III was anxious to promote. In the first session of the commission (21 October 1689) Jane opposed the removal of the Apocrypha from the calendar. In the second session he supported Thomas Sprat, bishop of Rochester, in protesting against the legality and expediency of the commission, and ceased to attend its meetings. The results of the deliberations of the commission were to be laid before convocation, and the Earls of Rochester and Clarendon went to Oxford to devise with Jane a scheme of opposition. When convocation met on 21 November Jane had organised a party, and contested the election of a prolocutor. Tillotson was the candidate of one party, Jane of the other, and Jane was elected by 55 votes to 28. After this the comprehension scheme was allowed to drop.

In Oxford he wrote the decree in 1690 which condemned the Naked Gospel of Arthur Bury. Jane had now little hopes of preferment from William III, and in 1696 it was rumoured that he was to be removed from his professorship and other preferments, because he had not signed the 'Association for King William'. Jane was a poor lecturer, and it was difficult for him to get an audience. The most pleasant thing recorded about him is the kindliness which he showed at Oxford to the ejected presbyterian, Thomas Gilbert. On Queen Anne's accession Jane again hoped for a bishopric, and from Francis Atterbury's letters it appears that there was a desire to get rid of him in Oxford, where much of his work as a teacher was discharged by George Smalridge as his deputy. Atterbury could suggest nothing better than the deanery of Wells, which was, however, given to another. Bishop Jonathan Trelawney appointed him, in February 1703, to the chancellorship of Exeter Cathedral, which he exchanged for the precentorship in May 1704. Jane held onto his professorship to the end. He resigned the precentorship of Exeter in 1706, and died on 23 February 1707 in Oxford, where he was buried in Christ Church.

== Works ==
The only writings published under Jane's name are four sermons: (1) on the consecration of Henry Compton, London, 1675; (2) on the day of the public fast, before the House of Commons, London, 1679; (3) on the public thanksgiving, before the House of Commons, Oxford, 1691; (4) before the king and queen at Whitehall, Oxford, 1692.

Academic offices
Preceded by Richard Allestree	Regius Professor of Divinity at Oxford; 1680—1707	Succeeded by John Potter
