= Thomas Byrth =

- Born: 11 September 1793; Devonport, Plymouth, Devon, England
- Died: 28 October 1849 (aged 56); Wallasey, Cheshire, England
- Occupation: Divine
- Known for: Unitarian controversy

Thomas Byrth (11 September 1793 – 28 October 1849) was an English teacher, cleric and scholar. He was of Quaker background, and became an evangelical low church Anglican. He was opposed to high Calvinism. He was a leading defender of the conventional view of the Trinity during the unitarian controversies of the 1830s and 1840s.

== Early years ==
Thomas Byrth was born in Plymouth Dock (now Devonport, Plymouth), on 11 September 1793. His father, John Byrth (1757–1813), was born and raised a Quaker in Kilkenny, County Westmeath, Ireland. In 1786 John Byrth married Mary Hobling, a Wesleyan Methodist from an old Cornish family, in Plymouth Dock. Their first child was baptised in a Wesleyan chapel. John Byrth was listed as being a grocer in Plymouth Dock in 1791. He retained his Quaker beliefs, and was in an 1809 list of Devon Quakers.

Thomas Byrth briefly attended the Callington, Cornwall, parish school, then spent eight years in a private school run by two Unitarian ministers. They were well-meaning but incompetent teachers. His then spent a year at a school in Launceston, Cornwall, run by Richard Cope (1776–1850), a congregational minister. Due to lack of money to pay for further education, Thomas Byrth took an apprenticeship at a chemist and druggist company in Plymouth founded by William Cookworthy (1705–80), a Quaker and pioneer porcelain manufacturer. Byrth was an apprentice with Cookworthys from 1809 to 1814.

Byrth became a close friend of Samuel Rowe (1793–1853), a bookseller and antiquarian. In 1814 they launched the Plymouth Literary Magazine and undertook an antiquarian tour of Cornwall. They published only six issues of the magazine, the last appearing on 19 November 1814. Also in 1814 they established a boarding school in Plympton, which was also short-lived. Byrth was still connected to the Quakers, but began to gradually adopt evangelical doctrines. He was a moderate evangelical, and was opposed to the high Calvinist teachings of Robert Hawker (1753–1827) that were in vogue in Plymouth at the time. Byrth was active in the Plymouth Athenaeum, described as "the centre of all literary, scientific and artistic life in South Devon."

== Teacher ==
In 1815 Byrth began to teach private pupils in the home of his mother, now a widow. The school was successful, and at one point had sixty pupils. One of his pupils was Benjamin Wills Newton, an extremely gifted boy from a Quaker background who followed Byrth when he moved to Diptford in the spring of 1823. Newton later said of Byrth, "He never did me justice, and I often thought that if I had been under different training how much I might have been the gainer... He was not an agreeable man, he hated mankind and mankind disliked him." However, another pupil wrote, "During the seven years in which I had the advantage of his care, he attracted a large number of pupils, and conducted one of the best schools in the west of England; and certainly no one ever fulfilled the duties of his profession with more conscientious zeal and unwearied attention."

== Anglican cleric ==
In 1818 Byrth matriculated at Magdalen Hall, Oxford. In 1819 he formally applied for membership in the Society of Friends (Quakers) on the grounds of birthright, but was rejected. On 21 October 1819 he was baptised into the Church of England at St. Andrew's Church, Plymouth. He continued to run the school in Plymouth until he was ordained a curate.

Byrth was ordained to the curacy of Diptford, near Totnes in Devon, in April 1823, remaining there until 1825. He taught some pupils while in Diptford. He took Bachelor's and master's degrees in the spring of 1826, and was a tutor at Oxford until 1827. On 5 February 1827 Byrth, then curate at St Clement's Church, Oxford, wrote that Henry Bulteel "has created a most powerful sensation here, by preaching ultra-Calvinism, and circulating Dr Hawker's tracts."

In 1827 Byrth was presented by Thomas Greenall to the small incumbency of Latchford, in the parish of Grappenhall in Cheshire. On 19 June 1827 he married Mary Kingdom.

In 1833 John Hatchard, Vicar of St. Andrew, Plymouth, nominated Berth to the perpetual curacy of St. Paul's, Stonehouse. In 1834 Byrth was collated by John Sumner, Bishop of Chester, to the rectory of Wallasey, Cheshire, now part of Merseyside. He became a Bachelor of Divinity on 17 October 1839 and took his degree of Doctor of Divinity two days later.

Byrth engaged in controversy with John Hamilton Thom on Unitarianism. In 1848 he edited the sermons of the Rev. Thomas Tattershall, D.D., incumbent of St. Augustine's Church, Liverpool, and prefixed to them a memoir of the author.

Byrth belonged to the "low church" movement in the Anglican church. His biographer says he "was an evangelical in religion and a Whig in politics. His scholarship was thorough, and he was possessed of poetic taste and antiquarian enthusiasm."

Byrth died in Wallasey on 28 October 1849, leaving a wife and seven children. A public subscription was raised for their benefit, and reached almost £4,000. Of his three sons and four daughters, born between 1828 and 1839, two of the sons also became Anglican priests, and one became a barrister. The west window in the Wallasey Church is filled with stained glass in his memory.

A fellow-clergyman, G. R. Moncreiff, published Remains of Thomas Byrth, D.D., F.A.S., Rector of Wallasey, with a memoir of his life in 1851. A sermon on his death, preached by the Rev. John Tobin in St. John's Church, Liscard, on 4 November 1849, was also published in 1851.

== Selected publications ==
Although known as a profound scholar, Byrth was not a prolific author. He published a memoir on Rev. Dr. Tatershall of Liverpool and a few sermons and pamphlets.

- Byrth, Thomas (1828), A Selection of Hymns, Longman, Rees, Orme, & Company
- Byrth, Thomas (1832), Observations on the Neglect of the Hebrew Language, and on the best mode of promoting its cultivation among the clergy, Hatchards
- Byrth, Thomas (1839), The Unitarian Interpretation of the New Testament based upon Defective Scholarship, or on Dishonest or Uncandid Criticism: a Lecture delivered in Christ Church, Liverpool, February 20, 1839, Liverpool: Perris

== Sources ==
- Burnham, Jonathan (1 January 2007), A Story of Conflict: The Controversial Relationship between Benjamin Wills Newton and John Nelson Darby, Wipf & Stock Publishers, ISBN 978-1-59752-759-0
- Carter, Grayson (14 October 2015), Anglican Evangelicals: Protestant Secessions from the Via Media, c. 1800 - 1850, Wipf and Stock Publishers, ISBN 978-1-4982-7837-9
- Courtney, William Prideaux (1886), "Byrth, Thomas, D.D.", Dictionary of National Biography, vol. 8, London: Smith, Elder, & Co.
- Howard, Joseph Jackson; Crisp, Frederick Arthur, eds. (1893), Visitation of England and Wales, vol. 1, London: Privately printed, p. 224
- "Rev. Thomas Byrth, D.D.", The Gentleman's Magazine (London, England), F. Jefferies, 1850
- Stunt, Timothy C. F. (31 August 2015), The Elusive Quest of the Spiritual Malcontent: Some Early Nineteenth-Century Ecclesiastical Mavericks, Wipf and Stock Publishers, ISBN 978-1-4982-0931-1
- Thom, Rev. D. (1853), "Liverpool Churches and Chapels; their Destruction, Removal or Alteration : with Norices of Clergymen, Ministers, and Others", Transactions of the Historic Society of Lancashire and Cheshire
