= Coombe Dean School =

Coombe Dean School Academy
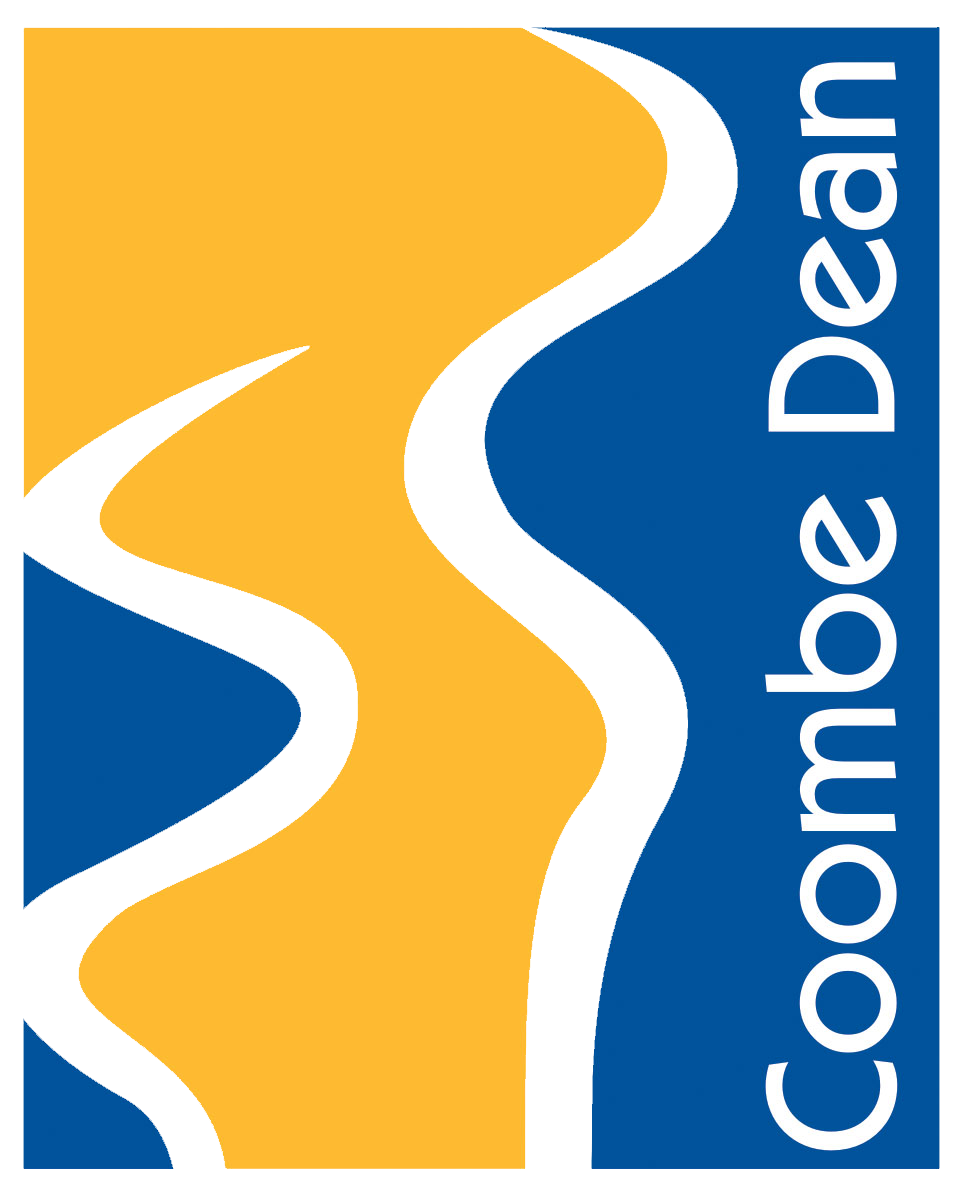

Location
- Charnhill Way; Elburton; Plymouth, Devon, PL9 8ES; England; 50°21′16″N 4°04′41″W

Information
- Type: Academy
- Motto: Community - Integrity - Opportunity
- Established: 1976
- Department for Education URN: 136558 Tables
- Ofsted: Reports
- Head teacher: Caroline Granville
- Staff: 134
- Gender: Mixed-sex education
- Age: 11 to 18
- Enrolment: 995
- Capacity: 1180
- Colours: Blue and gold (lower school) Green and grey (upper school)
- Website: www.coombedean.co.uk

Coombe Dean School, opened in 1976, is an academy secondary school on the outskirts of Plymouth, Devon, England. As of 2025, it had 995 pupils. The school has a sixth form.

== History ==
The school gained specialist school status in mathematics and computing in 2003. It became an academy in 2012.

In 2004, a teacher at the school was named secondary school teacher of the year by The Guardian.

== Academic performance and inspections ==
In 1999, inspection by Ofsted noted that "The majority of pupils on entry to the school have below average attainment. ... Overall, pupils make good progress and pupils with special needs make very good progress". In 2006, the school was judged Good. Inspectors noted that pupils "include significant numbers from areas of social disadvantage". In 2009, the school was judged Outstanding, with the comment that "In 2008, the school was placed in the top 4% of schools nationally for the progress which its students made between Year 7 and Year 11. This represents exceptional progress given their starting points". In 2012, inspection again found the school Outstanding. In 2018, the school was judged to Require Improvement: "Pupils do not make good progress across a range of subjects. ... Sixth-form students do not achieve well enough on applied general courses". As of 2025, the school's most recent inspection was in 2022, with a judgement of Good.

In 2024, the school's Progress 8 benchmark was average. 53% of children achieved grade 5 or above in English and mathematics GCSEs, compared to 46% across Plymouth and nationally. Progress at A-level was average, and the average grade was C, compared to C+ in Plymouth as a whole and B− nationally.

== Notable former pupils and staff ==
- Geoffrey Rees, educator, taught at the school from 1979-82
