= Naval Bank, Plymouth =

The Naval Bank was established as a private banking partnership in Plymouth, Devonshire, in 1774. It had branches in Devon at Dartmouth, Newton Abbot, Totnes, Ivybridge, Modbury, Paignton, Saltash, Stonehouse, Mutley, Devonport, Kingsbridge, Yealmpton and South Brent. In 1914 the bank became insolvent, having notoriously attempted to defraud its customers, and was acquired by Lloyds Bank.

== History ==
=== 1845/6 ===
In 1845/6 the partnership was called "Harris, Mudge & Co.", the partners being:

- Harry Bulteel Harris of Radford, Plymstock;
- Richard Zachariah Mudge, of Beechwood, Devon;
- Thomas Hillersden Bulteel, of Plymouth;
- Christopher Harris of Thorncott, Plymstock;
- Josias Hayne Dawe of Plymouth.
