= Simon Mountford (died 1537 or 1538) =

English politician

Simon Mountford (by 1487 – 1537 or 1538), of Sutton Coldfield and Kingshurst in Coleshill, Warwickshire, was an English politician.

He was the only son of Thomas Mountford. His grandfather, Sir Simon Mountford, was also an MP, and had been executed for supporting Perkin Warbeck, one of the pretenders to the throne of England during the reign of Henry VII.

He was a servant of Katherine of Aragon, the first wife of Henry VIII and captain of the Erassmus Shype in 1513. He served as a justice of the peace for Warwickshire from 1529 to his death and as the escheator for Warwickshire and Leicestershire from 1530 to 1532.

He was elected a member (MP) of the parliament of England for the constituency of Newport, Cornwall in 1529.

He married twice; firstly Anne, the daughter of Sir Ralph Longford of Longford, Derbyshire, with whom he had a son, Francis, and secondly Joyce, the daughter of Nicholas Rugeley of Dunton, Warwickshire and the widow of Hugh Harman of Moor Hall, Sutton Coldfield.

Parliament of England
New constituency	Member of Parliament for Newport; 1529–1536; With: William Harris 1529–1536	Succeeded by ?
