= Joseph Jane =

English politician

Joseph Jane (1595 – 1658) was an English royalist politician and controversialist.

== Life ==
He was born into an old family which had long been influential in Liskeard, Cornwall; his father Thomas was mayor there in 1621, Joseph himself was mayor of Liskeard in 1625, and Member of Parliament for the town in 1626. He was re-elected in 1640 to the Long Parliament.

He was a royalist and followed the king to Oxford in 1643 and sat in the Oxford Parliament. As a result he was disabled in 1644 from sitting in the Long Parliament. That same year he was one of the royal commissioners in Cornwall, where in August 1644 he entertained Charles I in his house. During 1645 and 1646 he was in correspondence with Sir Edward Hyde, afterwards Earl of Clarendon, on the state of the royalist cause in Cornwall.

He was at Pendennis Castle when it was taken by the Parliamentary forces in 1646 and suffered the confiscation of his estates. By 1649 he had moved to the continent to live at the Hague, where he took up writing. Remaining true to his principles, in 1650 and again in 1654 he was named clerk of the royal council.

He died at Middelburg in the United Provinces in 1658. His son William Jane was Regius Professor of Divinity at Oxford.

== Works ==
Jane undertook to answer John Milton's ‘Eἰκονοκλάστης’ in a work ‘Eἰκών Ἂκλαστος; the Image Unbroken, a Perspective of the Impudence, Falsehoode, Vanitie, and Prophaneness published in a libel entitled "Eἰκονοκλάστης against Eἰκών Βασιλικὴ,"’ published in 1651 (without place). It is a laborious answer to Milton, and takes his paragraphs in detail. Writing to Secretary Nicholas in June 1652, Edward Hyde said ‘the king has a singular good esteem both of Joseph Jane and of his book.’ Hyde shared this high opinion of the man, but doubted whether the book was worth translating into French, the better to counteract the effect of Milton's, as had been proposed.
