= Plymstock =

Suburb of Plymouth, Devon

- Civil parish
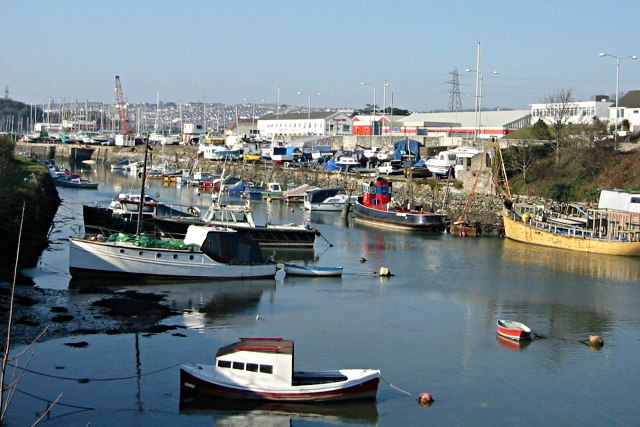
- Pomphlett Lake
- Interactive map of Plymstock
- Coordinates: 50°21′25″N 4°05′24″W
- Country: England
- Primary council: Plymouth
- County: Devon
- Region: South West England
- Status: Parish

Government
  - UK Parliament: South West Devon

Population
  - Total: 24,103

Plymstock is a commuter suburb of Plymouth and former civil parish in the English county of Devon.

The population at the time of the 2001 Census was recorded at 24,103 with 11,652 owner occupied homes in the PL9 postcode area. The total population in 2011 increased to 24,758

== Geography ==
Situated on the east bank of the River Plym, Plymstock is geographically and historically part of the South Hams. It comprises the villages Billacombe, Elburton, Goosewell, Hooe, Mount Batten, Oreston, Pomphlett, Staddiscombe, Turnchapel and Plymstock proper, the centrally located village after which the parish and suburb is named.

== History ==
The earliest surviving documentary reference to the place is as Plemestocha in the Domesday Book and its name is derived from Old English meaning either "outlying farm with a plum-tree" or, if it is short for Plympton Stock, "outlying farm belonging to Plympton".

The local branch railways through the area to Turnchapel and Yealmpton have been removed, the bridges and stations demolished, and the land built on. Pomphlett Mill has been demolished and the site used for a roundabout. Pomphlett Creek (shown right), once a popular rowing stretch has been partly filled in and what remains is largely silted up.

Until the 20th century Plymstock was a rural parish but began to develop rapidly just before and after the Second World War as a residential area outside Plymouth but acting as a dormitory area for the city. In 1961 the parish had a population of 14,700. On 1 April 1967, Plymstock, along with Plympton, was absorbed into the City of Plymouth and today, like Plympton, forms a populous and mostly home-owning south-eastern suburb of the city.

=== Bone Caves ===
In March 1978, caves containing fossilised bones were discovered in the Turnchapel area of Plymstock. Further caves were found around the city in the 19th and 20th centuries including those at Cattedown, Stonehouse, and Oreston.

== Amenities ==
The pedestrianised 1960s Broadway consists of a number of shops, including a supermarket, three banks, six estate agents' and other local amenities including a library, a fire station and a small police station. The parish church is St Mary and All Saints.

There are numerous public spaces including a huge public sports area at Staddiscombe. There are three rugby pitches at Elburton, there is a major golf club at Staddon Heights and a commercial driving range near Elburton.

There are many state primary schools in the area and two large comprehensive schools, Coombe Dean School and Plymstock School. There is one nearby independent school in the city, and children who choose to take and get a very high pass in the 11+ exam can attend one of the three grammar schools in Plymouth.

In 2008, Coombe Dean School achieved national notoriety after a popular school plan to erect two generating windmills was blocked by local councillors following opposition by residents of surrounding bungalows.

Frequent buses connect most areas of Plymstock with routes across the city linking with the railway station and Derriford hospital. There is a water taxi linking Mount Batten with Plymouth Barbican.

== Folklore ==
Childe's Tomb on Dartmoor is the legendary site of the death of Childe who, caught in a snowstorm, killed and disembowelled his horse and climbed inside for shelter, but still froze to death. He left a message to say that the first person to bury him would get his lands at Plymstock. The greedy monks of Tavistock buried him and claimed the lands. The ghosts of monks carrying a bier have supposedly been seen at Childe's Tomb.
