= Forgotten Corner of Cornwall =

Geographical area of South East Cornwall, England

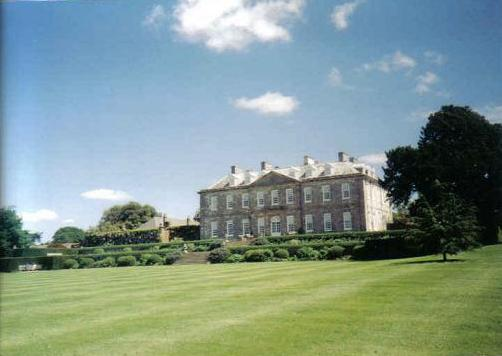
Antony House from the park

The Forgotten Corner of Cornwall is a geographical area of South East Cornwall, Great Britain. It includes the Rame Peninsula and the town of Torpoint, as well as villages like Antony, Downderry, Polbathic, Portwrinkle and Widegates.

== Description ==
There is no precise geographical definition for the "corner", but it is taken to mean (by local residents) all of the Rame Peninsula, as well as all of the English Channel coast area to the east of (but not including) Looe. The northern boundary of the corner is defined by the A38 road.

It is reputed to be "forgotten" because the area is effectively by-passed by Cornwall visitors, and is geographically remote from the administrative headquarters of Cornwall at Truro. It is over 50 miles away from the Cornish capital.

It is isolated due to its geography, as it is bounded by the English Channel, Plymouth Sound, the River Tamar and the River Lynher. Visitors have to double back on themselves after taking the main A38 road from Plymouth at Trerulefoot and onto the A374. There are no main railway stations within the area; the nearest is at St Germans, which has a limited train service. However, there is a frequent vehicular ferry to Torpoint from Plymouth, and a passenger ferry to Cremyll from Stonehouse, Plymouth. There is also a passenger ferry from Plymouth to Cawsand in the summer.

The area effectively became more remote when the then new Saltash Road Bridge on the A38 road was opened in 1961. Before the opening of this bridge, and the improvements to the A30 road from Exeter to Penzance, most road traffic entered Cornwall using the Torpoint Ferry, taking visitors directly into this area. After the bridge opened, and continued dual carriageway improvements were made on the A30 road, traffic travelling through this part of Cornwall reduced greatly.

The Rame Peninsula part of the Forgotten Corner is included in the Cornwall Area of Outstanding Natural Beauty. It is also steeped in history, with many military forts, and archaeological points of interest. The area is essentially rural, with the main industry being agriculture. It is also a residential commuting area for Plymouth. The area also has some of the wealthiest areas within Cornwall, as well as some of the poorest.

Historical note: Until boundary reform in the 19th century parts of the Rame Peninsula formed part of Devon as the manors had been possessions of Tavistock Abbey from Norman times.

== Places ==
Places in the district include: Antony, Cawsand, Crafthole, Cremyll, Downderry, Fourlanesend, Freathy, Hessenford, Higher Wilcove, Kingsand, Lower Tregantle, Maker, Millbrook, Mount Edgcumbe House, Mount Edgcumbe Country Park, Penlee, Polbathic, Portwrinkle, Rame, Rame Head, Rame Peninsula, Seaton, Seaton Valley Countryside Park, Sheviock, St John, Torpoint, Whitsand Bay, Widegates, and Withnoe Barton.

== See also ==
- Devonwall (possible UK Parliament constituency)
