= Rame Peninsula (electoral division) =

Former electoral division of Cornwall in the UK

- Former ward Cornwall Council
- Boundary of Rame Peninsula in from 2013-2021.
- County: Cornwall

2013–2021
- Number of councillors: One
- Replaced by: Rame Peninsula and St Germans
- Created from: Rame

Rame Peninsula (Cornish: Gorenys an Ros) was an electoral division of Cornwall in the United Kingdom which returned one member to sit on Cornwall Council from 2013 to 2021. It was abolished at the 2021 local elections, being succeeded by Rame Peninsula and St Germans.

== Councillors ==
Election	Member	Party
2013	George Trubody	Independent
2017	George Trubody	Independent
2021	Seat abolished	

== Extent ==
Rame Peninsula represented the villages of Portwrinkle, Crafthole, Wilcove, Antony, St John, Millbrook, Cremyll, Forder, Kingsand and Cawsand and the hamlets of Sheviock, Maryfield, Freathy and Rame. The division covered 3692 hectares in total.

== Election results ==
=== 2017 election ===
2017 election: Rame Peninsula
Party	Candidate	Votes	%	±%
Independent	George Trubody	1,431	67.9	▲39.8
Conservative	John Tivnan	469	22.2	▼5.7
Liberal Democrats	Marian Candy	202	9.6	▼6.7
Majority		962	45.6	▲45.4
Rejected ballots		7	0.3	▲0.1
Turnout		2109	55.7	▲6.8
Independent hold		Swing		

=== 2013 election ===
2013 election: Rame Peninsula
Party	Candidate	Votes	%	±%
Independent	George Trubody	536	28.1	N/A
Conservative	Chris Wilton	533	27.9	N/A
UKIP	Peter McLaren	524	27.4	N/A
Liberal Democrats	Becky Lingard	312	16.3	N/A
Majority		3	0.2	N/A
Rejected ballots		4	0.2	N/A
Turnout		1909	48.9	N/A
Independent win (new seat)				
