= Rame Peninsula =

Peninsula in south-east Cornwall, England

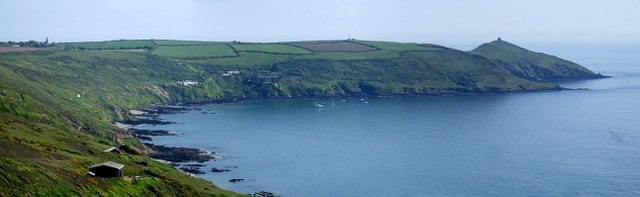
The Rame Peninsula

The Rame Peninsula /ˈreɪm/ (Cornish: Gorenys Rama) is a peninsula in south-east Cornwall. It is surrounded by the English Channel to the south, Plymouth Sound to the east, the Hamoaze to the northeast and the estuary of the River Lynher to the north-west. On a clear day, the Atlantic Ocean can be seen from advantageous points from Rame Head. The largest settlement is Torpoint, which is on the eastern coast, facing Devonport in Plymouth, Devon.

The peninsula is named after Rame Head, a headland on the south of the peninsula. The peninsula also includes the village and parish of Rame. 50.324°N 4.214°W The entire area of the peninsula is designated an Area of Outstanding Natural Beauty.

== Settlements ==
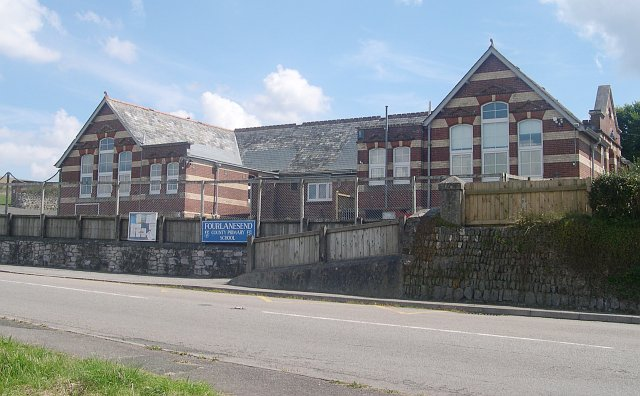
Fourlanesend School, one of the local primary schools for the Rame Peninsula

Other places on the peninsula include: Antony, Cawsand, Crafthole, Cremyll, Fourlanesend, Freathy, Higher Wilcove, Kingsand, Lower Tregantle, Maker, Millbrook, Mount Edgcumbe House, Mount Edgcumbe Country Park, Penlee, Portwrinkle, Sheviock, and St John and Withnoe Barton. Kingsand and Cawsand are protected by the headland. Much of the peninsula is owned by the Mount Edgcumbe estate which also includes Mount Edgcumbe Country Park.

== County history ==
Until boundary reform in the 19th century a part of the peninsula was part of Devon, not Cornwall. The Counties (Detached Parts) Act 1844 transferred parts of Maker and St John, ensuring those parishes (and the peninsula) were entirely in Cornwall. These manors had been possessions of Tavistock Abbey from Norman times.

== Military use ==
The peninsula has been the location of a number of fortifications defending the western approaches to Plymouth Sound, including Tregantle and Scraesdon Forts, and Tregantle Down, Hawkins, Rame Church and Penlee Batteries.

== See also ==
- Forgotten Corner of Cornwall
