= Cawsand Bay =

Bay on the coast of Cornwall, England

Coordinates: 50.330°N 4.200°W

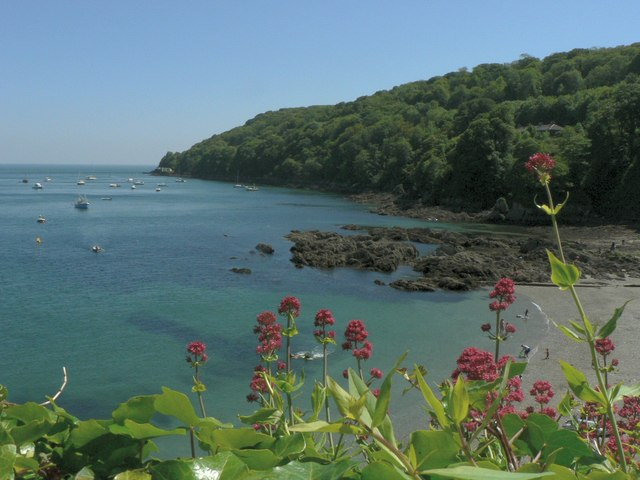
Cawsand Bay

Cawsand Bay is a bay on the southeast coast of Cornwall, England, United Kingdom.

The bay takes its name from the village Cawsand at grid reference SX 434 503, to the northeast of the Rame Peninsula. Cawsand Bay is oriented north–south, opening eastward into Plymouth Sound about 3 miles (5 km) south-southwest of Plymouth, as the crow flies.

Cawsand Bay is about one mile (1.6 km) across and about a mile-and-a-half (2.4 km) wide across its mouth and is bounded by Penlee Point to the south.

A once-popular ballad entitled "Harry Grady and Miss Elinor Ford, the Rich Heiress" appeared as early as 1840 in Hamilton Moore's Nautical Sketches (William Edward Painter, 1840). It was included under the title "Cawsand Bay" in Sir Arthur Quiller-Couch's The Oxford Book of Ballads (Clarendon Press, 1910).
