= Mount Edgcumbe Country Park =

Country park in Maker-with-Rame, Cornwall, England

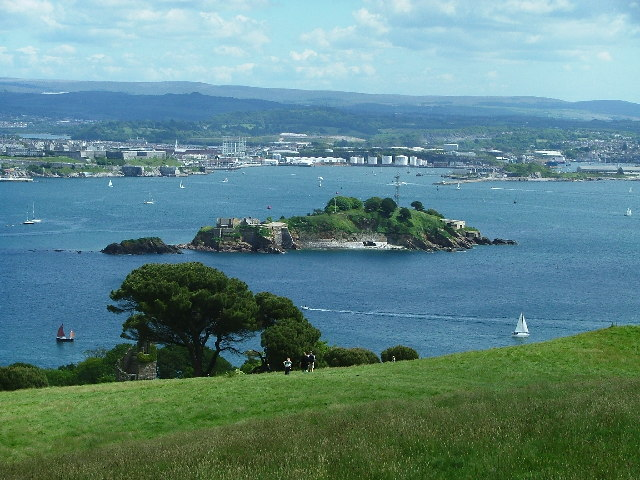
- View from Mount Edgcumbe Park across Plymouth Sound to Drake's Island

- Location within Cornwall
- 50.353°N 4.184°W

National Register of Historic Parks and Gardens
- Official name: Mount Edgcumbe
- Designated: 11 June 1987
- Reference no.: 1000134

Mount Edgcumbe Country Park is a grade I listed country park in Cornwall, England, United Kingdom. The 885 acres (3.58 km^{2}) country park is on the Rame Peninsula, overlooking Plymouth Sound and the River Tamar. The park has been famous since the 18th century, when the Edgcumbe family created formal gardens, temples, follies and woodlands around the Tudor house. Specimen trees, such as Sequoiadendron giganteum, stand against copses which shelter a herd of wild fallow deer. The South West Coast Path runs through the park for nine miles (14 km) along the coastline.

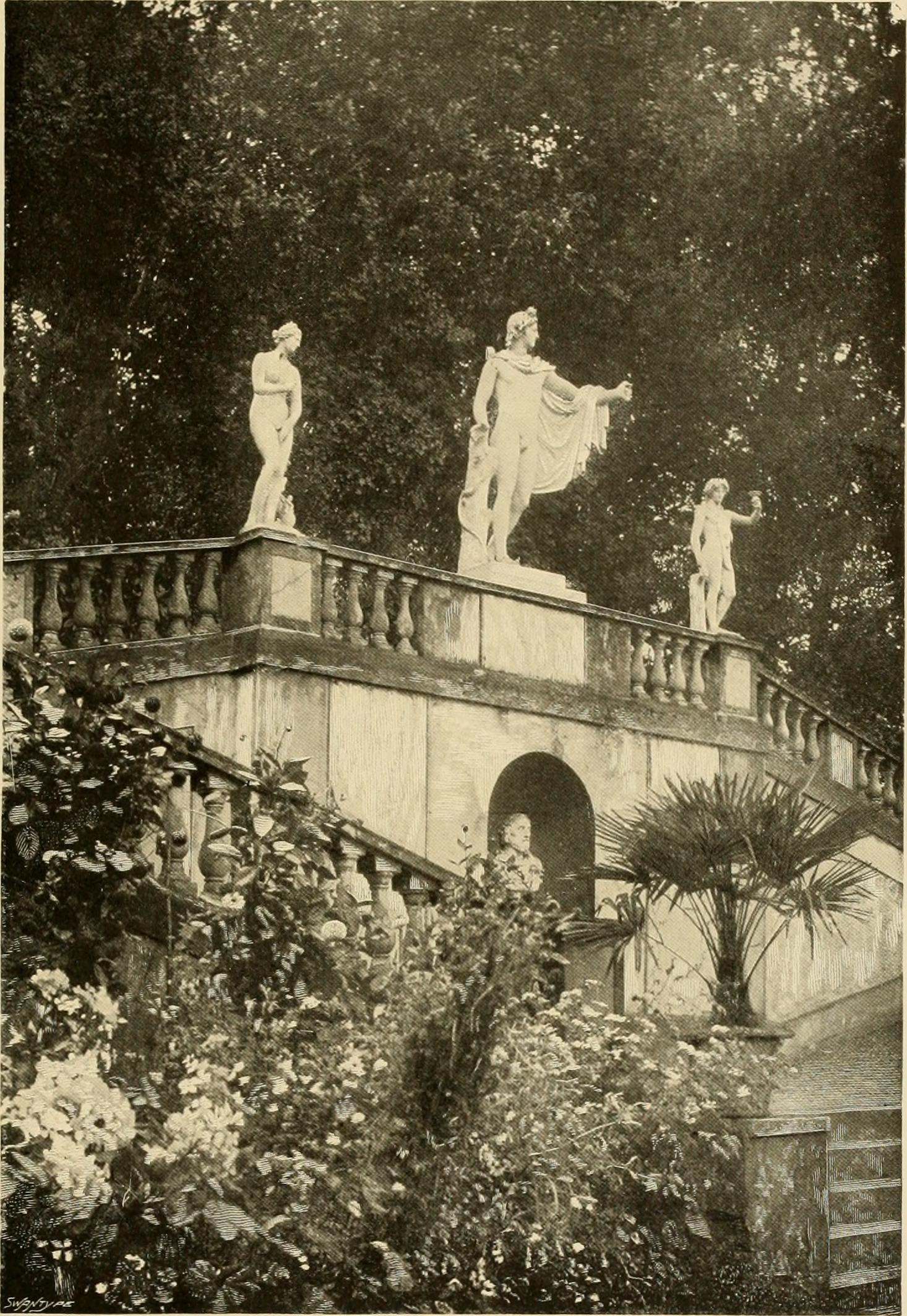
The Italian Garden

The park also contains the villages of Kingsand and Cawsand, as well as Mount Edgcumbe House itself. The Formal Gardens are grouped in the lower park near Cremyll. Originally a 17th-century 'wilderness' garden, the present scheme was laid out by the Edgcumbe family in the 18th century. The Formal Gardens include an Orangery, an Italian Garden, a French Garden, an English Garden and a Jubilee Garden, which opened in 2002, to celebrate the Queen's Golden Jubilee. The park and Formal Gardens are open all year round and admission is free. The park and gardens are jointly managed by Cornwall Council and Plymouth City Council. Although the park covers a large area, the park has limited formal maintenance. This gives it a rough and ready rural feel in all except the Formal Gardens.

== Features of the park ==
The park is well endowed with interesting features, many of which are grade II or grade II* listed.

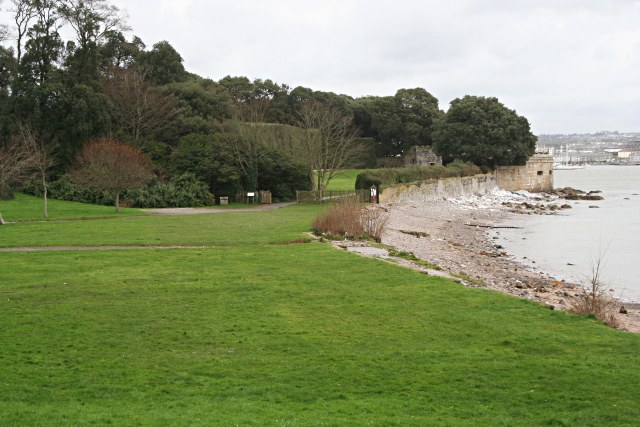
View across Barn Pool to the Formal Gardens

- Barn Pool - a sheltered deep water basin anchorage used by the Vikings in 997. Offshore there is a shipwreck of the Catharina von Flensburg. On 27 December 1831, HMS Beagle set off from here on her second survey voyage, captained by Robert FitzRoy with Charles Darwin on board.
- Barrow - c. 1200 BC - a Bronze Age burial mound, re-used as a "Prospect Mound" in the 18th century.

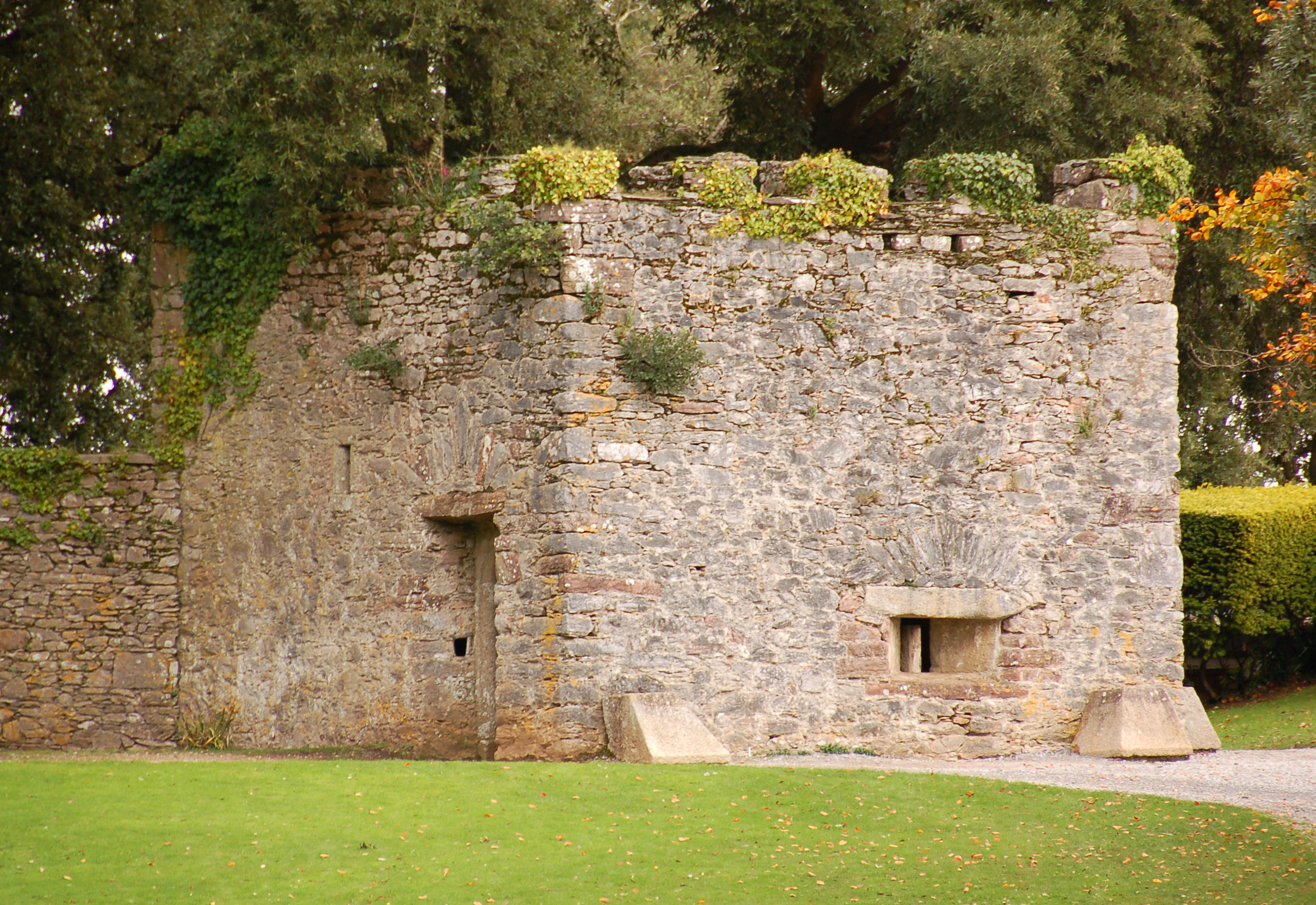
The Henrican blockhouse at Mount Edgcumbe which is believed to date from c. 1545

- Blockhouse - c. 1545 - a small fort built on the shoreline in King Henry VIII's reign, to defend the mouth of the Tamar and the Edgcumbes' town of West Stonehouse opposite.
- Coastguard Station at Rame Head - originally a Lloyd's signal station, where signalling was done from passing ships to the station by flags during the day and by lights at night, it became a radio station in 1905, then transferred to the Coastguards c. 1925.
- Cremyll Ferry - c. 1204 - a major ferry crossing between Devon and Cornwall since medieval times.
- Deer - in 1515 Sir Piers Edgcumbe was given permission by King Henry VIII to empark deer: the deer of today roam freely on the Rame Peninsula.
- Deer wall or Ha Ha - c. 1695 - a stone wall with outer ditch to protect the Amphitheatre from deer.
- Earl's Drive - in early days called the Terrace. A driveway from the house round the coast to Maker Church by 1788, extended to Penlee Point by 1823.

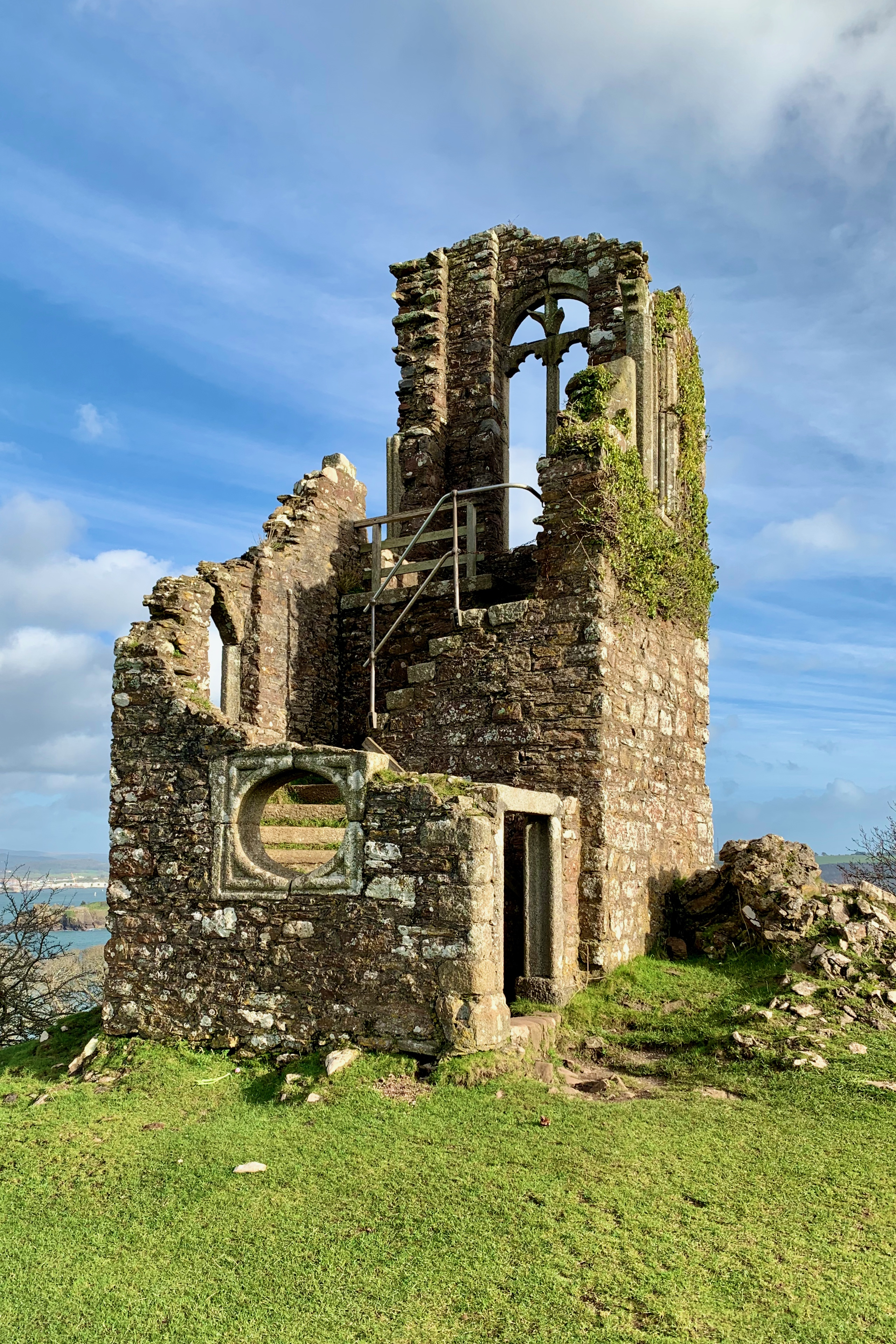
The Folly atop Mount Edgcumbe Country Park

- Folly - 1747 - an artificial ruin which replaced a navigation obelisk. It was built from stone from the churches of St. George and St. Lawrence, Stonehouse.
- Formal Gardens - From c. 1750 to 1820 - gardens in Italian, English and French styles. New Zealand, American (1989) and Jubilee Gardens (2003) have now been added.
- Garden Battery - c. 1747 and 1863 - an 18th-century saluting platform, originally mounted with 21 guns to greet visitors. Re-built in 1863 as part of Plymouth's Naval defences, with granite casemates for seven large 68-pounder guns.

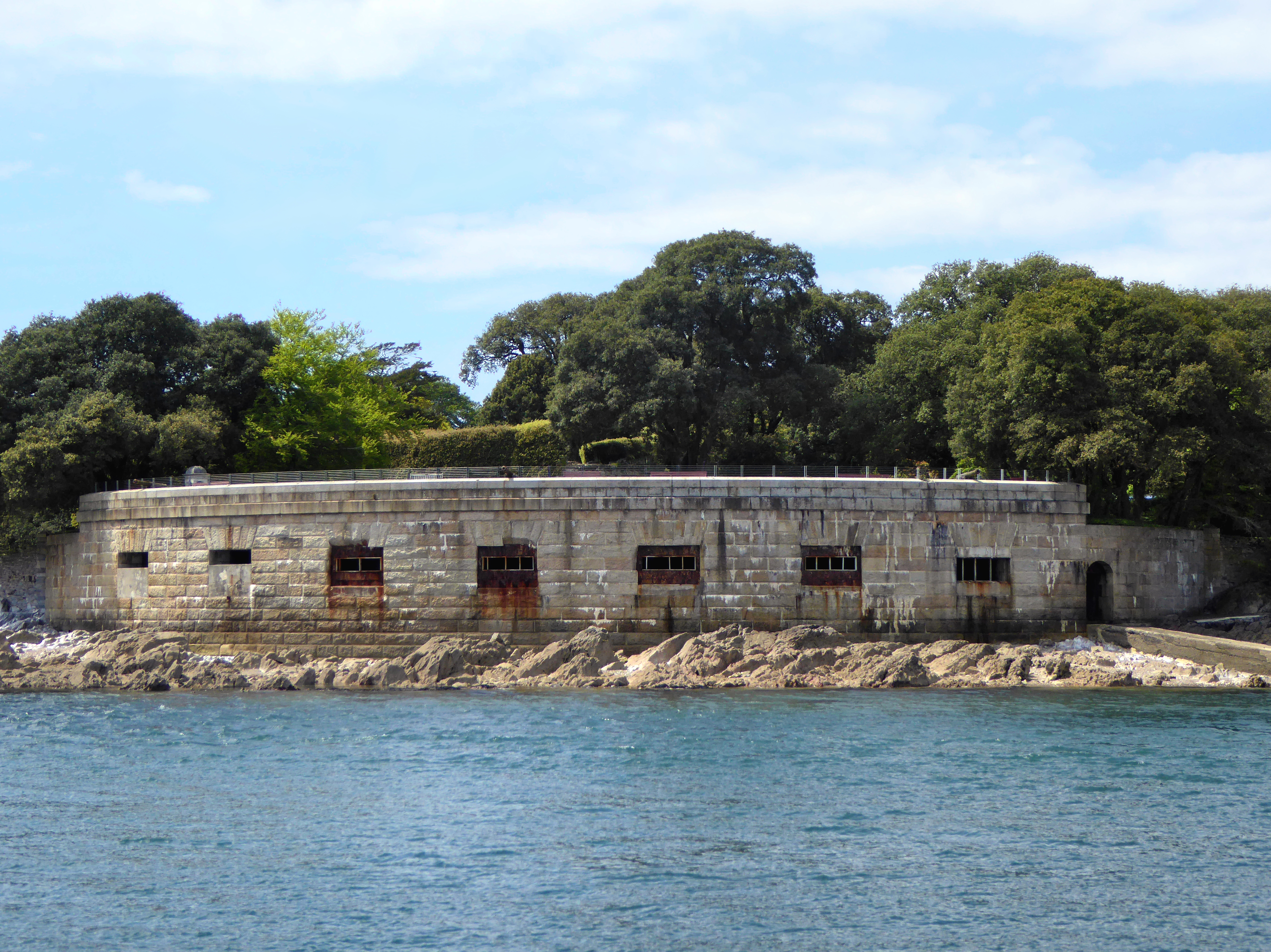
The Garden Battery

- Harbour View Seat - 18th century - a much damaged ornamental seat also known as White Seat, with views north up the River Tamar.
- Upper Deer House and Pebble Seat - 19th century - in the Grotton Plantation the ruins of a two-storey fodder store for deer; and the ruined 18th-century Pebble Seat facing south.
- Ice house - from around 1800, this ice house is under the bridge leading to the house. It is only open on special occasions.
- St Mary's and St Julian's Church - first mentioned in 1186, it was enlarged in the 15th century. This is the family church of the Edgcumbes.

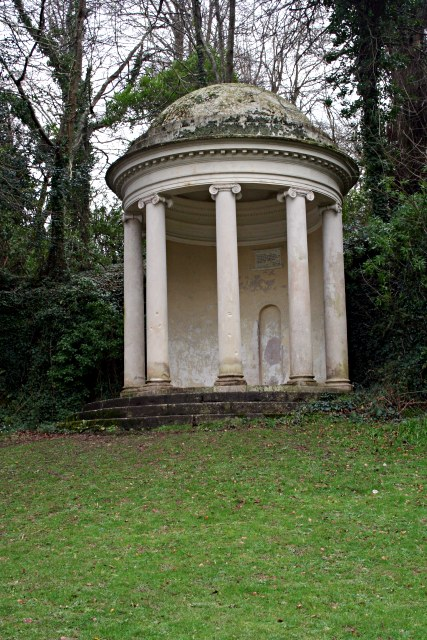
Milton's Temple

- Milton's Temple - a circular temple from 1755, with a plaque inscribed with lines from Paradise Lost; "overhead up grew, insuperable heights of loftiest shade..."
- The Orangery - The Orangery in the Italian Garden is thought to have been built as early as 1760. The building is now a fully licensed restaurant.
- Penlee Battery - 1892 - the remains of a Victorian fort armed with three guns in both world wars. A granite sculpture by Greg Powlesland, (1995), is in the nearby nature reserve.
- Picklecombe Fort Seat - a seat made from a doorway and enclosing a small niche with a piscina at the back. The carved stone comes from the churches of St. George and St. Lawrence at Stonehouse.
- Queen Adelaide's Grotto - 18th-century cave used as a watch house, enhanced with an arched stone building after Adelaide's visit, 1827.

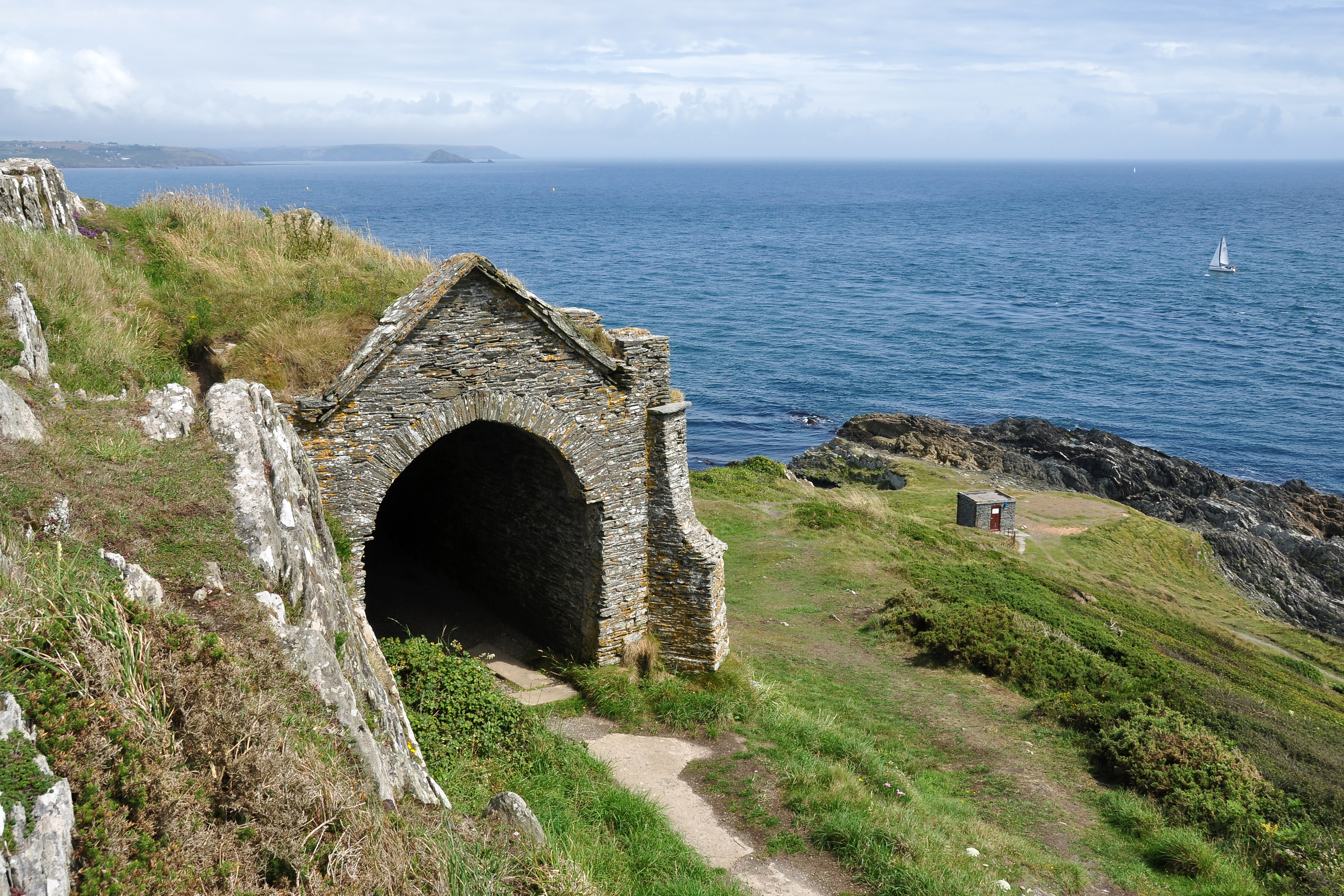
Queen Adelaide's Grotto at Penlee Point

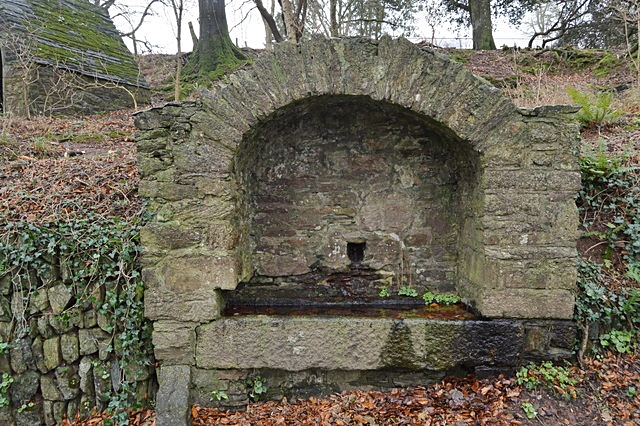
St Julian's Well

- Rame Church - Rebuilt from a Norman church in 1239, and enlarged in the 15th century
- Red Seat - 19th century - a ruinous rest house, sometimes called the Kiosk, which was painted red. Below is another ruined seat known as Indian Cottage or The Verandah.
- Stables - c. 1850 - the stables, dairy, smithy, sawmill and stores, all essential to the running of the estate. The stables are open to the public and house a cafe as well as various activity centres and art studios.
- St. Julian's Well - a very small 15th-century chapel and holy well, which was restored c. 1890.

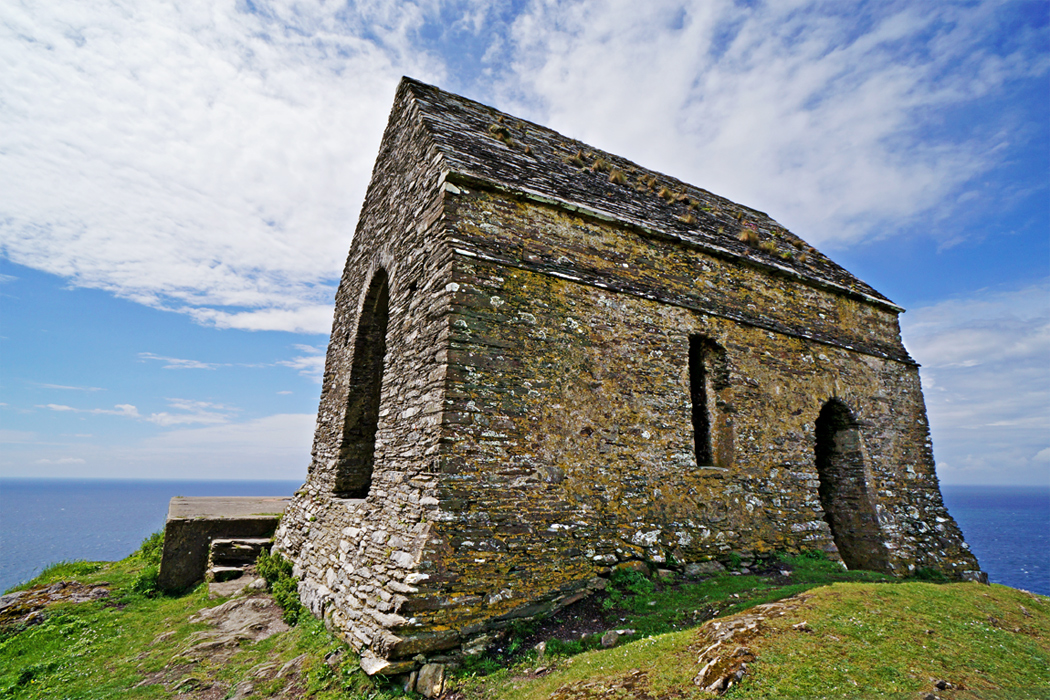
St. Michael's Chapel at Rame Head

- St. Michael's Chapel - 14th century - a chapel and simple lighthouse on Rame Head, with a beacon site nearby. Across the neck of the headland are the earthworks of an Iron Age fort.
- South West Coast Path - this goes around the Country Park
- Thomson's Seat - from around 1760, a Doric pavilion with seats looking across to Plymouth Sound. Verses from The Seasons are inscribed on the wall.
- West Lodge and Arch - the Arch over the Earl's Drive may have been built to mark the creation of the Viscount in 1781.
- Zig-Zags - the Zig-Zag walks were from the 1760s, and became famous in the 19th century as "The Horrors". Intricate paths on a dramatic cliff, surrounded by exotic shrubs. The lower cliff paths and some stone seats have been lost to cliff erosion.

== Wildlife and ecology ==
Several larvae of the beautiful pearl (Agrotera nemoralis), were found by members of the Cornish branch of Butterfly Conservation on European hornbeam (Carpinus betulus) during August 2013. The micro-moth was previously only known (in Britain) from East Blean Woods, Kent.
