= Maryfield =

Maryfield can refer to:

== Places ==
- Rural Municipality of Maryfield No. 91, Saskatchewan
  - Maryfield, Saskatchewan; village in Saskatchewan
- Maryfield, Cornwall; hamlet in Cornwall, England
- Maryfield, Belfast, location of the Maryfield Secretariat under the Anglo-Irish Agreement (1985–98)

== Other ==
- Maryfield (horse), racehorse
- Maryfield Hospital; a former hospital in Dundee, Scotland

== Similar spelling ==
- Mary Field (1909–96) American film actress
