= Whitsand Bay =

Bay in Cornwall, England

Coordinates: 50°20′N 4°17′W

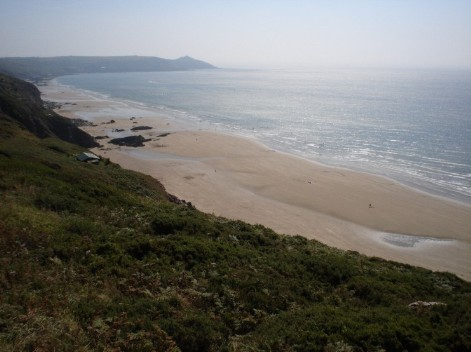
Withnoe (Main) Beach portion of Whitsand Bay

Whitsand Bay (Cornish: Baya Logh, western section; Cornish: Baya Gwynndreth, eastern section), situated in south east Cornwall, England, runs from Rame Head in the east to Portwrinkle in the west. It is characterised by sheer, high cliffs, dramatic scenery and long stretches of sandy beaches. The South West Coast Path runs the length of the bay.

== Geography ==
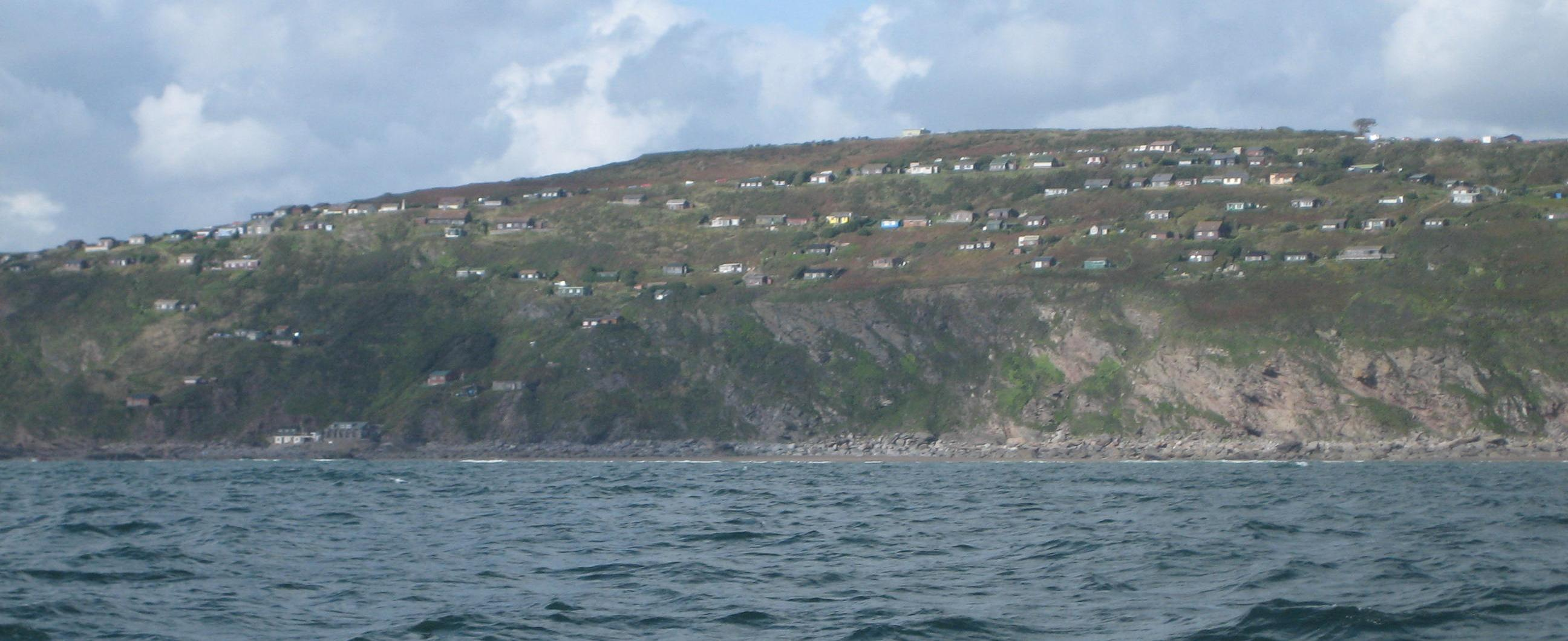
Holiday cottages on the hill

The bay is overlooked by Rame Head, a conical hill with the ruins of a 14th-century chapel dedicated to St Michael on top. Polhawn Cove is a rough beach, consisting of sharp rocks, shingle and an area of open sand. West of Captain Blake's Point, long stretches of sand are interspersed with rocky headlands and small bays, many inaccessible at high tide. The holiday settlements of Freathy and Tregonhawke are built on terraces on the cliff faces.

A National Trust property at Sharrow Point preserves a small cave excavated by hand in 1874 by a hermit called Lugger, who inscribed verses on the ceiling to relieve his boredom. Lugger's Cave is fenced off to the public.

The headland forms part of Rame Head & Whitsand Bay SSSI (Site of Special Scientific Interest), noted for its geological as well as biological interest. The SSSI contains 2 species on the Red Data Book of rare and endangered plant species; early meadow-grass (poa infirma) and slender bird's-foot-trefoil (from the lotus genus).

== General information ==
A campaign to stop the dumping of dredged silt and sludge (5.3 million tonnes since the 1980s) from the River Tamar and the port of Plymouth has been running for several years. In 2010 the group with the help of Sheryll Murray secured an independent review of the dump site, but the review stated that no significant environmental impact has occurred and the dumping continues.

There is a UK Ministry of Defence firing range between Tregantle Fort at the western end of the bay and Trethill Cliffs near Portwrinkle, and this area is closed during Tregantle Fort firing range operations.

Whitsand Bay is popular with divers, and in 2004 the former Royal Navy frigate HMS Scylla was scuppered to provide a new underwater reef. The Scylla was sunk nearby an existing World War II wreck, the Liberty Ship James Eagan Layne.

HMS A7, an early Royal Navy submarine, sank in Whitsand Bay, Cornwall on 16 January 1914 with the loss of her crew whilst carrying out dummy torpedo attacks on Onyx (her tender) and Pygmy. An oil slick was seen and the location marked. Several attempts were made to salvage her over the next month by attaching hawsers to the eye-ring on the bow, but her stern was too deeply embedded in the mud and the hawsers parted without pulling her out. She lies today where she sank, in about 130 feet (40 m) of water. In 2001, she was declared as one of 16 wrecks in British waters designated as "Controlled Sites" under the Protection of Military Remains Act by the British Government and which cannot be dived without special permission.

The beach does not have any toilets and access to the beach is steep, narrow and slippery. Whitsand Bay is a popular surfing spot. An RNLI lifeguard service operates between May and September at the foot of Tregonhawke cliff, where there is a surf school and a cafe.

=== Safety ===
There are dangerous rip currents. The western part of the beach is closed during firing range operation at Tregantle Fort, firing times are indicated by a red flag. The paths to the beaches at Sharrow Point, Withnoe, Tregonhawke and Freathy are steep, narrow and slippery and are not suitable for wheelchairs. There is a risk of being cut off at high tide.

== Whitsand Bay Fortifications ==
The 1859 Royal Commission on the Defence of the United Kingdom identified Whitsand Bay as a weak point in the defences of Plymouth and proposed two Palmerston forts; Polhawn Battery at the eastern end, whose guns would cover the beaches and prevent an amphibious assault, and Fort Tregantle at the western end which prevented an overland approach.

=== Polhawn Battery ===
Polhawn Fort
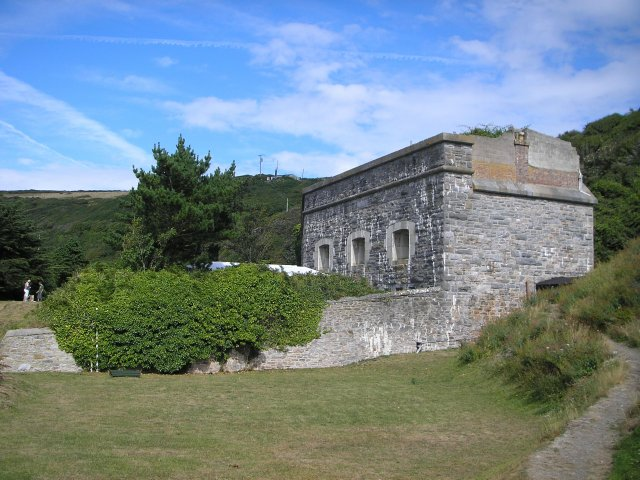
- Interactive map of Polhawn Fort

Listed Building – Grade II*
- Official name: Polhawn Fort
- Designated: 19 November 1986
- Reference no.: 1310634

The battery was designed by Captain Edmund Frederick Du Cane and was completed in 1864. It is a two-storey work built of limestone with granite facings, sited on the cliff overlooking the bay. The upper storey consists of seven casemates which originally housed 68-pounder guns. The lower floor consisted of accommodation and a magazine. The rear was protected by a narrow ditch, crossed by a drawbridge at roof level and defended by three caponiers and numerous loopholes in the rear wall. In 1885, the smoothbore guns were replaced by seven 64-pounder rifled muzzle-loaders, which served until 1898; a proposal to replace them with two 6-pounder quick-firing guns was not implemented. During the First World War, the battery was used for accommodation for gunnery officers and the magazine was used as a military detention cell. The battery was sold by the War Office in 1927, becoming a hotel and tea room; the name appears to have changed to Polhawn Fort at this time. It was sold again in 1968 and has been restored as a hotel and wedding venue.

=== Tregantle Fort ===
At the western end of Whitsand Bay, Tregantle Fort stands 360 feet above sea level. It is hexagonal in shape and is surrounded by a ditch on three sides. The fort was completed in 1865 and included a barracks designed for 1,000 men. It was intended to be armed with 22 7-inch guns but only seven were ever fitted. It was used for musketry training during World War I and gas warfare training and accommodation for US troops in World War II. It is currently part of the Defence Estate and is regularly used as a live firing range with red flag warnings and the path down to the beach closed. Tregantle Down Battery was also built a short distance from the fort between 1888 and 1894.

=== Whitsand Bay Battery ===
Whitsand Bay Battery
- Interactive map of Whitsand Bay Battery

Scheduled monument
- Official name: Whitesand Bay (or Tregonhawke) battery
- Designated: 19 March 1976
- Reference no.: 1004664

When the Stanhope Committee reviewed the country's defences in 1887, it was realised that naval artillery had improved so much that it would have been possible for enemy warships to anchor in the Bay and bombard Plymouth without being threatened by the existing forts. To counter this threat, a battery of three 12.5 inch rifled muzzle-loaders and two 6 inch breech-loaders was constructed near Stone Farm at the top of Tregonhawke Cliff. The RML guns were mounted in concrete open barbettes and 6-inch guns on Hydropneumatic disappearing carriages. The battery was strongly fortified against land attack with a dry moat protected by three caponiers.

It was completed in 1893 at a cost of £25,991. but The 6-inch guns did not stay in place very long and were removed in 1897. Despite recommendations for rearming during the First World War, the RMLs remained the sole armament until the battery was fully disarmed in 1920. During World War II, the battery was used for radar training, as part of the Coast Artillery Training Centre, Plymouth. It was released by the military in 1951 and became a caravan park. Although the ditch has been filled-in, many of the original features can still be seen.
