= Lower Tregantle =

Hamlet in Cornwall, England

Coordinates: 50.360°N 4.263°W

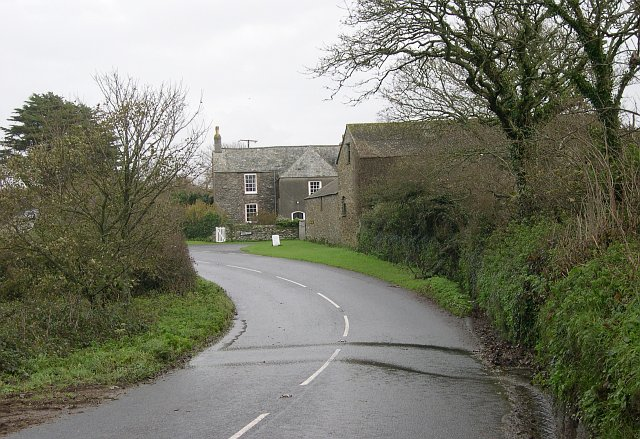
- Higher Tregantle Farm

- Location within Cornwall
- OS grid reference: SX391536
- Civil parish: Antony
- Unitary authority: Cornwall
- Ceremonial county: Cornwall
- Region: South West
- Country: England
- Sovereign state: United Kingdom
- Post town: Torpoint
- Postcode district: PL11 3

Lower Tregantle is a hamlet in Cornwall, England, UK. It is about half a mile south of Antony; Higher Tregantle is about a quarter of a mile further south. It should be distinguished from Lower Tregantle, a farm near Luxulyan.

Higher Tregantle Farmhouse is a grade II listed building with part of the house dating back to the 17th century.

== See also ==
- Tregantle Fort
