= St John, Cornwall =

Village in Cornwall, England

Coordinates: 50.361°N 4.238°W

St John: Cornish: S. Jowan
- Location within Cornwall
- Population: 391 (2011 Census)
- OS grid reference: SX409536
- Civil parish: St John
- Unitary authority: Cornwall
- Ceremonial county: Cornwall
- Region: South West
- Country: England
- Sovereign state: United Kingdom
- Post town: TORPOINT
- Postcode district: PL11
- Dialling code: 01752
- Police: Devon and Cornwall
- Fire: Cornwall
- Ambulance: South Western
- UK Parliament: South East Cornwall

St John (parish: Cornish: Pluwjowan, village: Cornish: S. Jowan) is a coastal civil parish and a village in south-east Cornwall, England, United Kingdom, 3 miles (4.8 km) south of Saltash and 1.5 miles (2.4 km) south-west of Torpoint.

== Geography ==
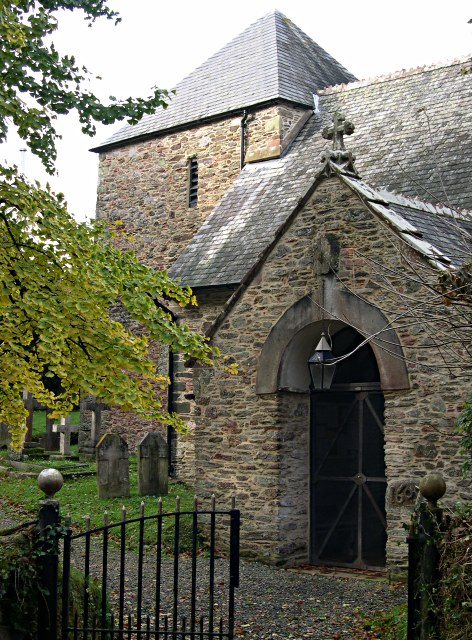
St John Church

The parish is opposite Plymouth, separated from it by St John's Lake, an inlet of The Hamoaze in Plymouth Sound. St John parish is in the St Germans Registration District and the population in the 2001 census was 375, increasing to 391 at the census 2011. To the north, the parish is bordered by St John's Lake and to the south by the sea. To the east, the parish is bordered by Millbrook, to the south-east by Maker-with-Rame and to the west by Antony parish.

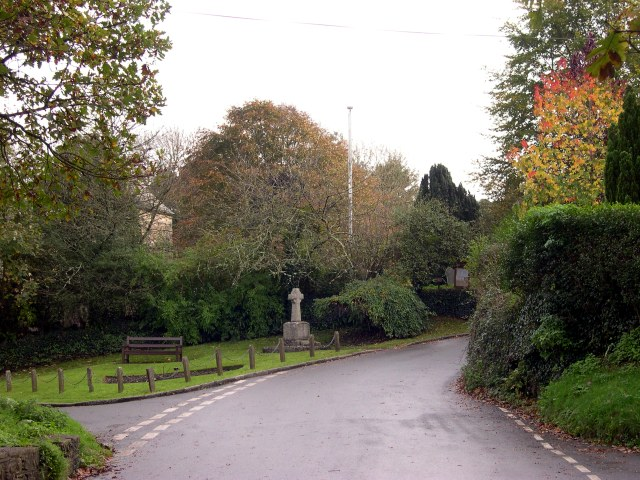
The road outside the church

A few hundred metres north of St John village is an area of high ground called Vanderbands, the site of an Iron Age castle mentioned by John Norden (an English topographer who wrote a series of county histories) in his description of Cornwall published in 1728.

The St John's Lake SSSI (Site of Special Scientific Interest) is designated mainly for its bird interests, with 6000 wildfowl and 10000 waders overwintering on the mudflats. There is an unusual tidal ford on a minor public road. Part of the land designated as St John's Lake SSSI is owned by the Ministry of Defence.

== Parish church ==
The historic records for much of this area were kept at Mount Edgcumbe House but were destroyed during the war, however, a church existed here in 1080.

The present church was built in about 1150. It was originally dedicated to St John the Evangelist but was later, probably in about 1490, changed to St John the Baptist. It stands in St John village at OS Grid Ref SX407536.

The church was a Norman foundation but only the low western tower survives from the Norman period. The chancel and nave were rebuilt in the 15th century and subsequently restored.

== Notable residents ==
Charles Adolphus Row (1816–1896), a Christian preacher and moral philosopher, was born here.

== See also ==
- Freathy
