= Maker-with-Rame =

Civil parish in Cornwall, England

Coordinates: 50.336°N 4.200°W

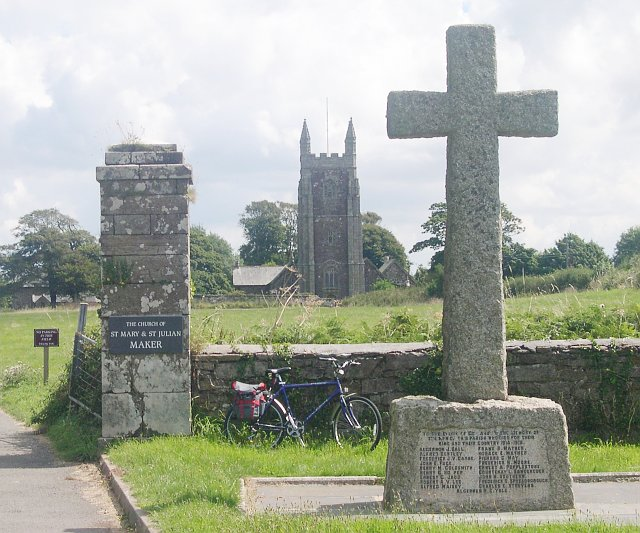
- Maker church

- Location within Cornwall
- Population: 977 (2011 census)
- Civil parish: Maker-with-Rame
- Unitary authority: Cornwall
- Shire county: Cornwall
- Region: South West
- Country: England
- Sovereign state: United Kingdom
- Police: Devon and Cornwall
- Fire: Cornwall
- Ambulance: South Western

Maker-with-Rame (Cornish: Magor a-berth Hordh) is a civil parish in Cornwall, England, United Kingdom. It is situated on the Rame Peninsula, approximately four miles (6.5 km) south of Saltash and two miles (3 km) west of Plymouth.

The parish was formed in 1941 from the ecclesiastical parishes of Maker and Rame. It occupies the eastern end of the Rame peninsula and is surrounded on three sides by sea: the Hamoaze to the north, Plymouth Sound to the east, and the English Channel to the south and southwest. To the west, Maker-with-Rame is bounded by Millbrook civil parish. The population of the parish (including Anderton) at the 2011 census was 1,020.

Maker-with-Rame takes its name from its principal villages, Maker and Rame. Other settlements in the parish include Cawsand, Cremyll and Kingsand. The population of the parish at the 2011 census was 977.
