= William Hughes (writer) =

British writer

William Hughes (2 March 1803 – 20 August 1861), was a British writer on law and angling in the 19th century.

== Biography ==
Hughes, born in Maker Vicarage, Cornwall, was the fourth son of Sir Robert Hughes, third baronet, by his second wife, Bethia, daughter of Thomas Hiscutt, and was a nephew of Admiral Sir Richard Hughes. His father, who matriculated from Trinity College, Oxford, on 30 March 1757, aged 17, was a demy of Magdalen College 1758–67, B.A. 1761, M.A. 1763, rector of Frimley St Mary and Weston, Suffolk, from 1769 until his death, and was buried on 4 June 1814.

William was admitted to the bar at Gray's Inn on 11 June 1833, and practised as a conveyancer on the Western Circuit, where he was also auditor of the poor-law union district of Cornwall and Devonshire. He died at Millbay Grove, Plymouth.

== Works ==
Hughes's chief writings were:

- 1833: Practical Directions for Taking Instructions for, and Drawing Wills
- 1840: A Practical Treatise of the Laws Relative to the Sale and Conveyance of Real Property: with an appendix of precedents, comprising contracts, conditions of sale, purchase and disentailing deeds. 2 vols. London: Saunders & Benning
- 1842: The Practical Angler. By Piscator
- 1843: Fish, How to Choose, and How to Dress. By Piscator
  - --do.--2nd edit., 1854, entitled A Practical Treatise on the Choice and Cookery of Fish
- 1846: The Practice of Sales of Real Property, with an Appendix of Precedents. 2 vols. London: John Crockford, 1846–47
  - --do.-- 2nd ed. 2 vols. London: John Crockford, 1849–50
- 1846: The Three Students of Gray's Inn: a novel
- 1848: The Practice of Mortgages of Real and Personal Estate. 2 vols., London: John Crockford, 1848–49
- 1850: The New Stamp Act
- 1850: Concise Precedents in Modern Conveyancing. 3 vols. London: Law Times Office, 1850–53
  - -- 2nd ed. 3 vols. London: Law Times Office; Dublin: Hodges and Smith, 1855–57
- 1850: A Table of the Stamp Duties Payable in Great Britain and Ireland
- 1852: It is All for the Best: a Cornish tale
- 1856: The Practice of Conveyancing. 2 vols. London: Law Times Office, 1856–57
