= Kingsand =

Village in Cornwall, England

Coordinates: 50.3336°N 4.2012°W

Kingsand: Cornish: Porthruw
- Location within Cornwall
- OS grid reference: SX435505
- Civil parish: Maker-with-Rame
- Unitary authority: Cornwall
- Ceremonial county: Cornwall
- Region: South West
- Country: England
- Sovereign state: United Kingdom
- Post town: TORPOINT
- Postcode district: PL10
- Dialling code: 01752
- Police: Devon and Cornwall
- Fire: Cornwall
- Ambulance: South Western
- UK Parliament: South East Cornwall

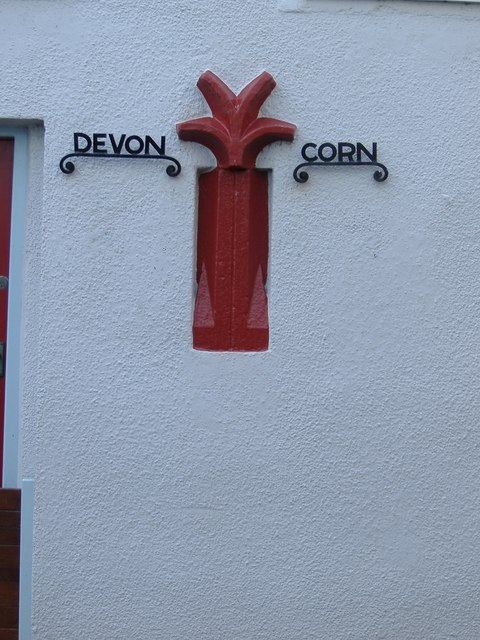
Devon Corn Cottage

Kingsand (Cornish: Porthruw) and Cawsand are twin villages in southeast Cornwall, United Kingdom. The villages are situated on the Rame Peninsula and are in the parish of Maker-with-Rame.

Until boundary changes in 1844, Kingsand was in Devon; Cawsand, however, has always been in Cornwall. On the old county boundary between the two villages, the house Devon Corn still displays the boundary marker.

== History ==
The villages are known for their smuggling and fishing past. Although the known smuggling tunnels have been sealed up, there are still old fish cellars and boat stores along the coast.

One notable former resident was John Pollard RN, a midshipman (later a Commander) who served in the Navy under Horatio Nelson. He is credited with being ‘Nelson's avenger’, since it was he who shot the French sailor who killed the Admiral.

Another notable resident includes Tabitha Ransome (daughter of renowned writer Arthur Ransome).

== Geography ==
Kingsand lies on the shores of Cawsand Bay, with the South West Coast Path running through the village. The village coast, as well as the coast 1 km to the east, forms the Kingsand to Sandway Point SSSI (Site of Special Scientific Interest), which shows examples of extensive Early Permian volcanicity and rhyolite.

== Transport ==
Kingsand is connected via the Rame bus link to Plymouth. The Rame bus link runs between Cremyll and goes to Plymouth via Torpoint. During the summer, the Cawsand Ferry runs a passenger service between Cawsand Beach and the Mayflower Steps in Plymouth for visitors to the Barbican. Walkers can reach the village through Mount Edgcumbe Country Park.

== Local landmarks ==
=== The Clock Tower and Institute ===
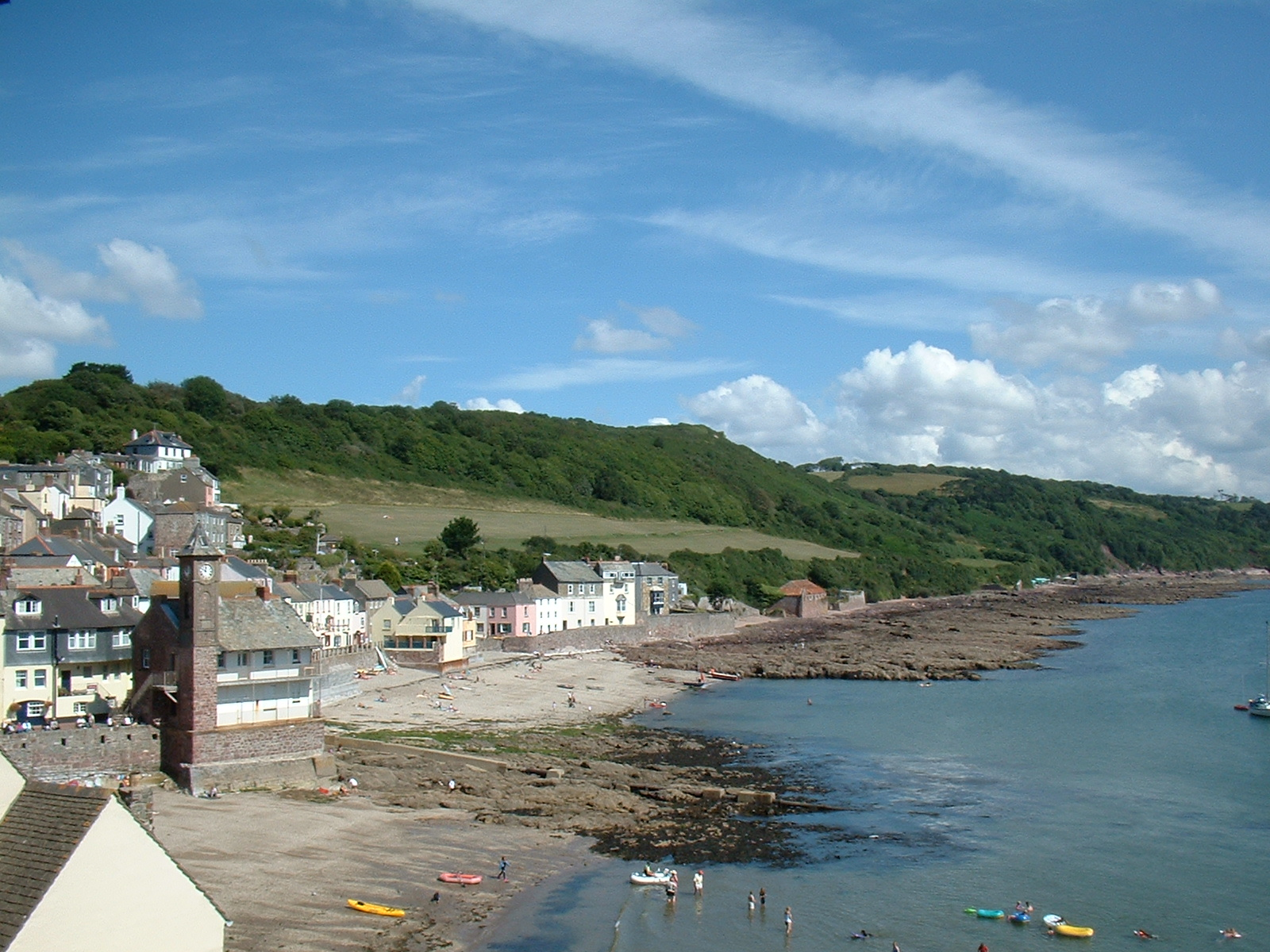
Kingsand-Cawsand village.

A key feature of the village is the clock tower and Institute along the seafront. It was erected in 1911 to commemorate the coronation of King George V. The institute is used as a community hall. It contains a large cross-stitch tapestry picture of the two villages which was made by residents to commemorate the Golden Jubilee of Queen Elizabeth II. The building sustained substantial storm damage in February 2014 and has since been restored.

=== Church ===
The former St Paul's Church was opened in 1882 as a chapel of ease to the Church of St Mary and St Julian. It is now the Maker-with-Rame Community Hall.

=== Beaches ===
Kingsand Beach is a mixture of sand and shingle, which is located along The Cleave. Girt Beach is mainly shingle, but with some sand and can be found along Market Street. Sandways lies a short walk out of the village, across the rocks towards Fort Picklecombe.

The water quality has improved over recent years thanks to extensive sewerage works, and so all beaches are safe for swimming.

== Culture and community ==
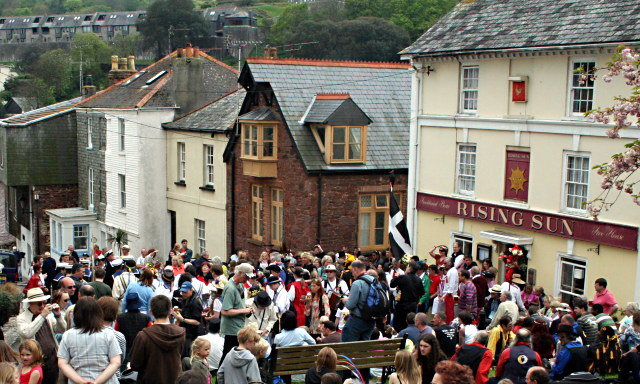
The Black Prince Flower Boat Procession. The procession is seen here gathering outside the Rising Sun pub in Kingsand.

The Black Prince Procession is a Mayday custom in the villages of Kingsand, Cawsand and Millbrook. The procession, where a flower-adorned boat is carried on the shoulders, begins in Millbrook and carries on through Kingsand and Cawsand to banish the harsh conditions of winter and welcome warmer summer weather and a fruitful land and sea harvest. Additional activities include the decoration of buildings, Morris dance and maypole dance, a fete and a town crier competition. Black Prince refers to Edward the Black Prince (1330-1376), the first Duke of Cornwall.

The Rame Peninsula Male Voice Choir was founded in Kingsand in 1976 and was awarded the Queen's Award for Voluntary Service in 2018.

=== In popular culture ===
Parts of the film Mr. Turner were filmed in Kingsand, portraying Margate.
