= Portwrinkle =

Coordinates: 50.362°N 4.311°W

Portwrinkle: Cornish: Porthwykkel
- Location within Cornwall
- OS grid reference: SX357539
- Civil parish: Sheviock
- Unitary authority: Cornwall
- Ceremonial county: Cornwall
- Region: South West
- Country: England
- Sovereign state: United Kingdom
- Post town: TORPOINT
- Postcode district: PL11
- Dialling code: 01503
- Police: Devon and Cornwall
- Fire: Cornwall
- Ambulance: South Western
- UK Parliament: South East Cornwall

Portwrinkle (Cornish: Porthwykkel) is a small coastal village in south-east Cornwall, England, United Kingdom. It is at the western end of Whitsand Bay five miles (8 km) south-west of Saltash.

Portwinkle was traditionally a fishing village, and the old 17th-century walls of the pilchard cellars are still standing, although they have been incorporated into housing. The village has a harbour, and two beaches are accessible from it. Although the village has no shops, apart from the beach car park cafe, there is a post office in nearby village of Crafthole.

The Whitsand Bay Hotel – formerly a mansion called Thanckes House in nearby Torpoint, dismantled and re-erected in Portwrinkle – closed in 2018 but (as of 2022) the Grade II listed building still stands, awaiting redevelopment.

== Eglarooze Cliff ==
Eglarooze Cliff (Cornish: Eglos Ros), to the west of the village, is designated a Site of Special Scientific Interest for its biological interest. The cliff is noted to contain 2 Red Data Book endangered plant species; the slender bird's-foot trefoil and carrot broomrape.
