= Maryfield, Cornwall =

Hamlet in Cornwall, England

Coordinates: 50.384°N 4.218°W

Maryfield
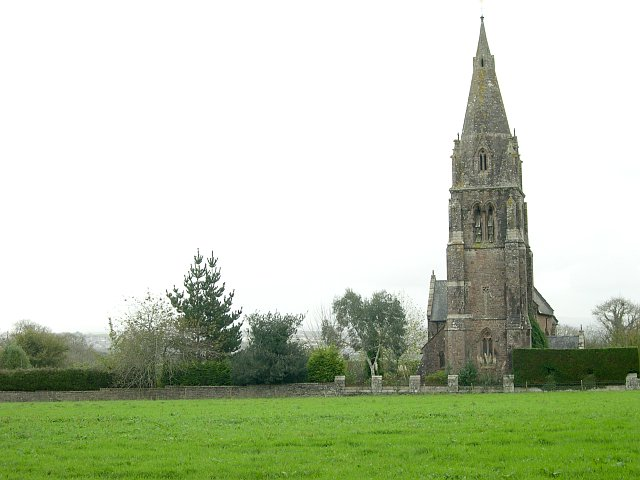
- The Church of St Philip and St James, Maryfield

- Location within Cornwall
- OS grid reference: SX424561
- Civil parish: Antony
- Unitary authority: Cornwall
- Ceremonial county: Cornwall
- Region: South West
- Country: England
- Sovereign state: United Kingdom

Maryfield is a hamlet north of Torpoint and east of Antony House in southeast Cornwall, England.
