= Rame, Maker-with-Rame =

Village in Cornwall, England

Coordinates: 50.3246°N 4.2133°W

Rame: Cornish: Rama
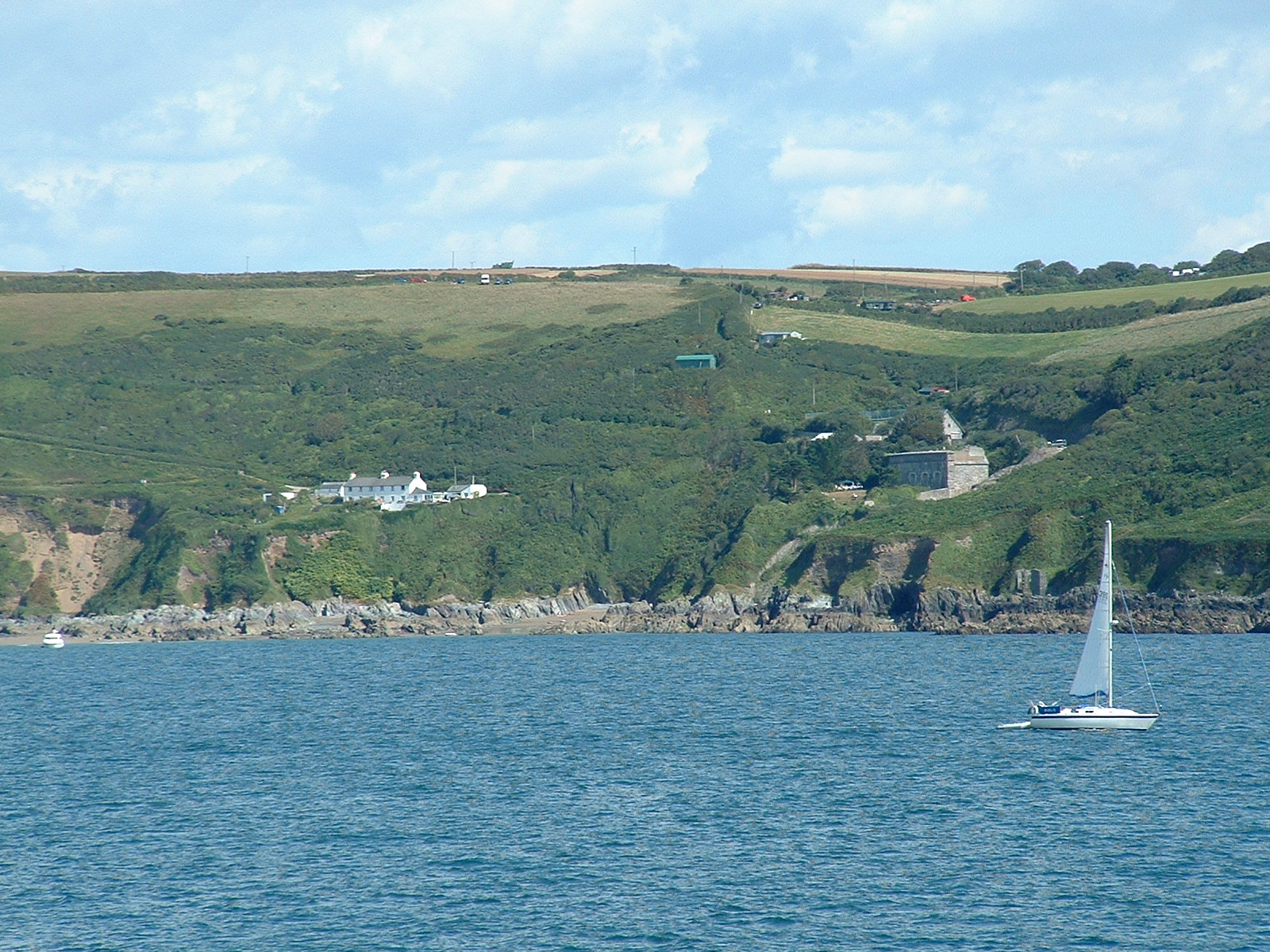
- Rame viewed from the sea

- Location within Cornwall
- OS grid reference: SX425494
- Civil parish: Maker-with-Rame
- Unitary authority: Cornwall
- Ceremonial county: Cornwall
- Region: South West
- Country: England
- Sovereign state: United Kingdom
- Post town: TORPOINT
- Postcode district: PL10
- Dialling code: 01752
- Police: Devon and Cornwall
- Fire: Cornwall
- Ambulance: South Western
- UK Parliament: South East Cornwall

Rame (Cornish: Rama) is a village and former civil parish, now in the parish of Maker-with-Rame, in the Cornwall district, in the ceremonial county of Cornwall, England. It is situated on the Rame Peninsula, between Rame Head and the village of Cawsand, in South East Cornwall. In 1931 the parish had a population of 501. On 1 April 1950 the parish was abolished and merged with Maker to form "Maker with Rame". Rame means the high protruding cliff, or possibly, the ram's head.

Cawsand was previously in the parish of Rame but now has its own church. The parish of 'Maker-with-Rame' is formed of the hamlets Maker, which also has a church and Rame. Rame was recorded in the Domesday Book of 1086, when it was held by Ermenhald from Tavistock Abbey. There were 27 households, land for 6 ploughs, 10 acres of pasture and 30 acres of underwood. An electoral division bearing the same name also existed, but was succeeded by the Rame Peninsula division. The population as of the 2011 census was 4,763.

There is another Rame near Falmouth in west Cornwall. It is believed that the west Cornwall Rame was named after the one on the Rame Peninsula.

During his time in command of the Channel Fleet between 1805 and 1807 John Jervis, 1st Earl of St Vincent rented a house in Rame.

== Parish church ==
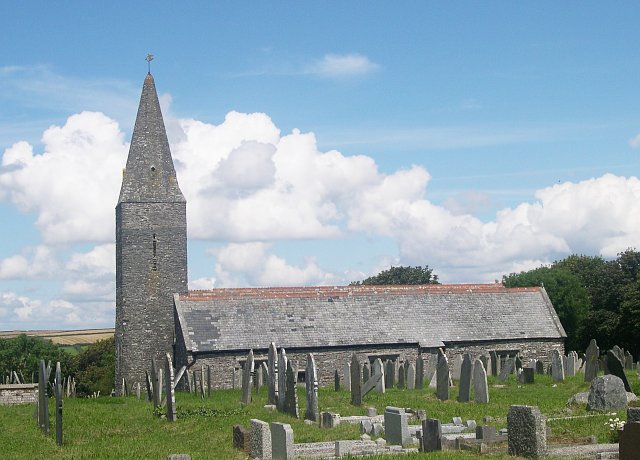
Rame Church

The church in the hamlet is dedicated to St. Germanus, the fighting bishop who is supposed to have landed in the neighbourhood when he came to Britain to suppress the Pelagian heresy in 400. The site however is also an ancient Cornish pagan holy site. Built of rough slate, the present stone building was consecrated in 1259. The slender, un-buttressed tower with its broached spire (an unusual feature in a Cornish church), the north wall and the chancel are all probably of this date, when the church was cruciform in shape. A southern aisle was added in the 15th century and the Norman tympanum is a relic of the earlier church building on the site. The church is not supplied with electricity and so is lit by candles.
