= Maker, Cornwall =

Village in Cornwall, England

Coordinates: 50.3451°N 4.1911°W

Maker
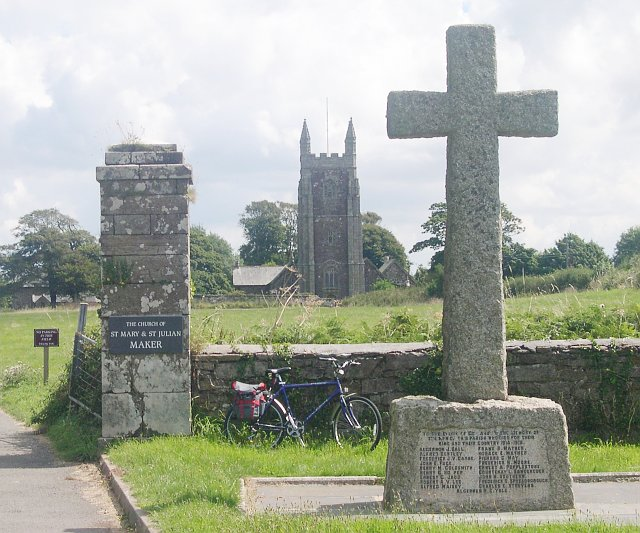
- Maker Church and War Memorial

- Location within Cornwall
- Civil parish: Maker-with-Rame
- Unitary authority: Cornwall
- Ceremonial county: Cornwall
- Region: South West
- Country: England
- Sovereign state: United Kingdom
- Police: Devon and Cornwall
- Fire: Cornwall
- Ambulance: South Western

Maker (Cornish: Magor) is a village between Cawsand and Rame Head, Rame Peninsula, Cornwall, England, United Kingdom.

The name means a ruin or old wall in Cornish, possibly because the church was built from the ruins of West Stonehouse in Cremyll. This origin of the name is unlikely, as Maker is first referred to in 705AD, which predates the construction of the church. Another supposition is that the "old walls" are those of a (now lost) Roman-British villa. However, another Celtic name is Egloshayle, (not to be confused with Egloshayle on the River Camel) which means, "the church on the estuary".

The village and its neighbour Rame are in the civil parish of Maker-with-Rame and the parliamentary constituency of South East Cornwall. The parish had a population of 1,020 at the 2011 census.

== History ==
In the late 7th Century the West Saxons and native Britons had engaged in a series of battles near the River Parrett. Around this time Aldhelm wrote a letter to King Geraint of Dumnonia describing him as 'Lord of the Western Kingdom' suggesting that all of Devon and Cornwall still retained a single ruler. The letter is fairly confrontational in places, and its purpose is to encourage Geraint to get the Briton church to accept the Roman calculation of Easter and Tonsure. Bede notes that Aldhelm's efforts were successful and, in 705, King Geraint of Dumnonia gave the promontory on the Cornish side of the mouth of the River Tamar to Sherborne Abbey, where Aldhelm was the Bishop.

The Normans installed the Valletorts as tenants of most of the land controlling the Tamar. From them, Maker passed by marriage to the Durnford family and then to the Edgcumbes.

Maker was recorded in the Domesday Book (1086) when it was held by Reginald from Robert, Count of Mortain. There was 1 hide of land and land for 8 ploughs. There were 3 ploughs, 4 serfs, 6 villeins, 8 smallholders, 60 acres (24 ha) of pasture. The value of the manor was £1 sterling though it had formerly been worth £1 10s.

In 1931 the civil parish had a population of 886. On 1 April 1950 the parish was abolished and merged with Rame to form "Maker with Rame".

== Parish church ==
St Mary's and St Julian's Church is a typical 15th century Cornish church. It was a time of rebuilding throughout the country and churches were designed for preaching the word rather than stressing the liturgy. The aisles are the same length as the nave, and there is a massive western tower. The font is Norman, but was originally at St Merryn. The Edgcumbe chapel was added in 1874.

== Maker Redoubts ==
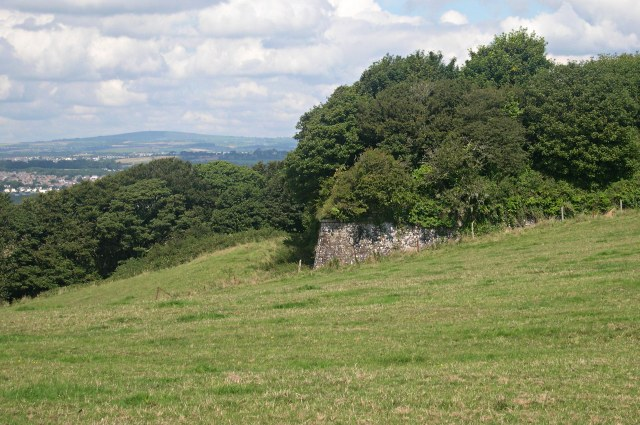
Redoubt Number 5 with stone revetments on the Maker Heights.

During the American War of Independence, it was thought that an attacking force could establish themselves on the ridge of high ground near Maker, which overlooked both Plymouth Sound and the Royal Dockyard at Devonport. In August 1779, a fleet of French and Spanish ships anchored off Cawsand Bay but withdrew soon afterwards; regular and militia troops camped on Maker Heights for the following three summers and constructed a line of five earthen redoubts or small forts along the ridge under the direction of Lieutenant-Colonel Dixon. During the French Revolutionary Wars, redoubts Number 4 and 5 were rebuilt with stone revetments and a sixth stone redoubt was built at Empacombe in 1807. A supporting barracks was built for the redoubts between 1804 and 1808. Some of the redoubts were reused in the second World War to protect buildings associated with a nearby heavy anti-aircraft battery for six guns, installed to protect Plymouth.

== Fort Picklecombe ==
Fort Picklecombe, near Maker, was commissioned by Lord Palmerston as one of a series of coastal defences against possible French invasion. It has since been converted into residential apartments.

== Cornish wrestling ==
Cornish wrestling tournaments, for prizes, were held on the Green in Maker in the 1700s.

== Notable residents ==
- Richard Edgcumbe, 1st Baron Edgcumbe (1680–1758), Whig politician who sat in the House of Commons from 1701 until 1742, famous in Edgecombe County, North Carolina.
- George Edgcumbe, 1st Earl of Mount Edgcumbe (1720–1795), a British peer, naval officer and politician.
- William Hughes (1803–1861), barrister and writer.
