= John Pollard (Royal Navy officer) =

British Royal Navy officer (1787–1868)

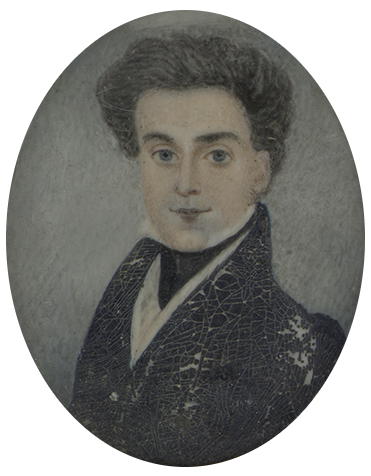
- Born: 27 July 1787; Cawsand, Cornwall, England
- Died: 22 April 1868 (aged 80); Greenwich, London, England
- Spouse: Matilda Trevethan (m. 1822)
- Children: 6
- Military career
- Allegiance: United Kingdom
- Branch: Royal Navy
- Service years: 1799–1868
- Conflicts: Battle of Trafalgar

John Pollard (27 July 1787 – 22 April 1868) was a Royal Navy officer who served with Admiral Lord Nelson at the Battle of Trafalgar. Pollard is credited with being the man who killed the Frenchman who shot Nelson.

== Biography ==
=== Early life and career ===
John Pollard was born 27 July 1787 in Cawsand, Cornwall. He entered the Royal Navy in November 1799, serving on HMS Havick, HMS Culloden, in 1802, and HMS Canopus, in 1803. At the age of 18, he transferred to HMS Victory from March to November 1805, serving as midshipman.

=== Battle of Trafalgar ===
At the Battle of Trafalgar, HMS Victory became entangled with the French ship Redoutable. Snipers from the Redoutable opened fire and wounded Admiral Lord Nelson, who later died. During the battle, Pollard was stationed on the poop deck, where he was acting as a signaller, along with a quarter-master possibly called John King. At some point during the fight, Pollard was joined by fellow midshipman Francis Edward Collingwood who had come up from the quarter-deck. Both men returned fire on the French ship and were supplied by the third man. At this point the story differs as to the exact turn of events.

According to author Robert Southey both Pollard and Collingwood fired at the same time, killing a Frenchman, who had been identified by the quarter-master as having shot Nelson. The man fell into the mizzen-top and when they recovered him, he was found to have been shot in the head and chest.

Pollard, in an 1863 letter to The Times, stated that Collingwood had left the poop deck prior to the death of the French sniper. Ship's surgeon Sir William Beatty, writing in a December 1805 edition of the Gibraltar Chronicle, stated that there were two men in the mizzen-top, one of whom was killed by a musket-ball and the other by Pollard.

An 1826 book posing to be the autobiography of a French Sergeant Robert Guillemard contains the claim that it was he who shot Nelson. This claim is to this day believed and frequently repeated, although in October 1830, J. A. Lardier admitted in a letter to the editor of the Annales Maritimes that it was he who wrote the book, and that Guillemard is a fictitious character.

=== Later career and death ===
Pollard was later brought before Sir Thomas Hardy and congratulated as having been the man to avenge Nelson's death. Pollard was promoted to lieutenant in 1806 and continued to serve in the Royal Navy. Pollard married Matilda Trevethan in 1822 and had six children. He did not advance in rank and later joined the Irish Coast Guard from 1836.

In 1852, at the age of 65, he was awarded the position of Lieutenant of Greenwich Hospital, later being made an honorary retired commander, where he stayed until his death at the age of 81 on 22 April 1868. His grave was later moved and the exact site can't be pinpointed.
