= Wilcove =

Village in Cornwall, England

Coordinates: 50.38847°N 4.20652°W

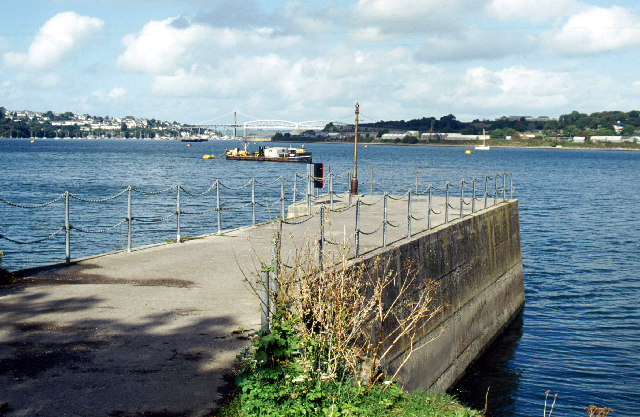
Looking north from Wilcove jetty with the Royal Albert Bridge in the distance

Wilcove (Cornish: Porthfenten) is a small coastal village in Cornwall, England, United Kingdom. It is situated one mile (1.6 km) north of Torpoint and one mile (1.6 km) west of Devonport (part of the city of Plymouth) across the Hamoaze, the tidal estuary of the River Tamar.

Wilcove is in the civil parish of Antony.

Wilcove has an active community association, a village hall and a riverside pub. The Carew-Pole family, of Antony House, have a long association with the village. Traditionally the village had a strong agricultural sector, with two farms - Whitehall Farm and Home Farm - employing many people from the village. Post-war Bullock Diamond Factory - later Select Gauges - was located in Wilcove. The village also enjoyed a long connection with the Royal Navy: HMS Defiance, a small naval base, was located in the village until the 1950s; HMS Valiant, a large pumping ship, was moored off Wilcove between the wars. The South-East part of the village houses the Thanckes oil depot, which is run by the Ministry of Defence.
