= Penlee Point, Rame =

Penlee Point
- Coastal headland
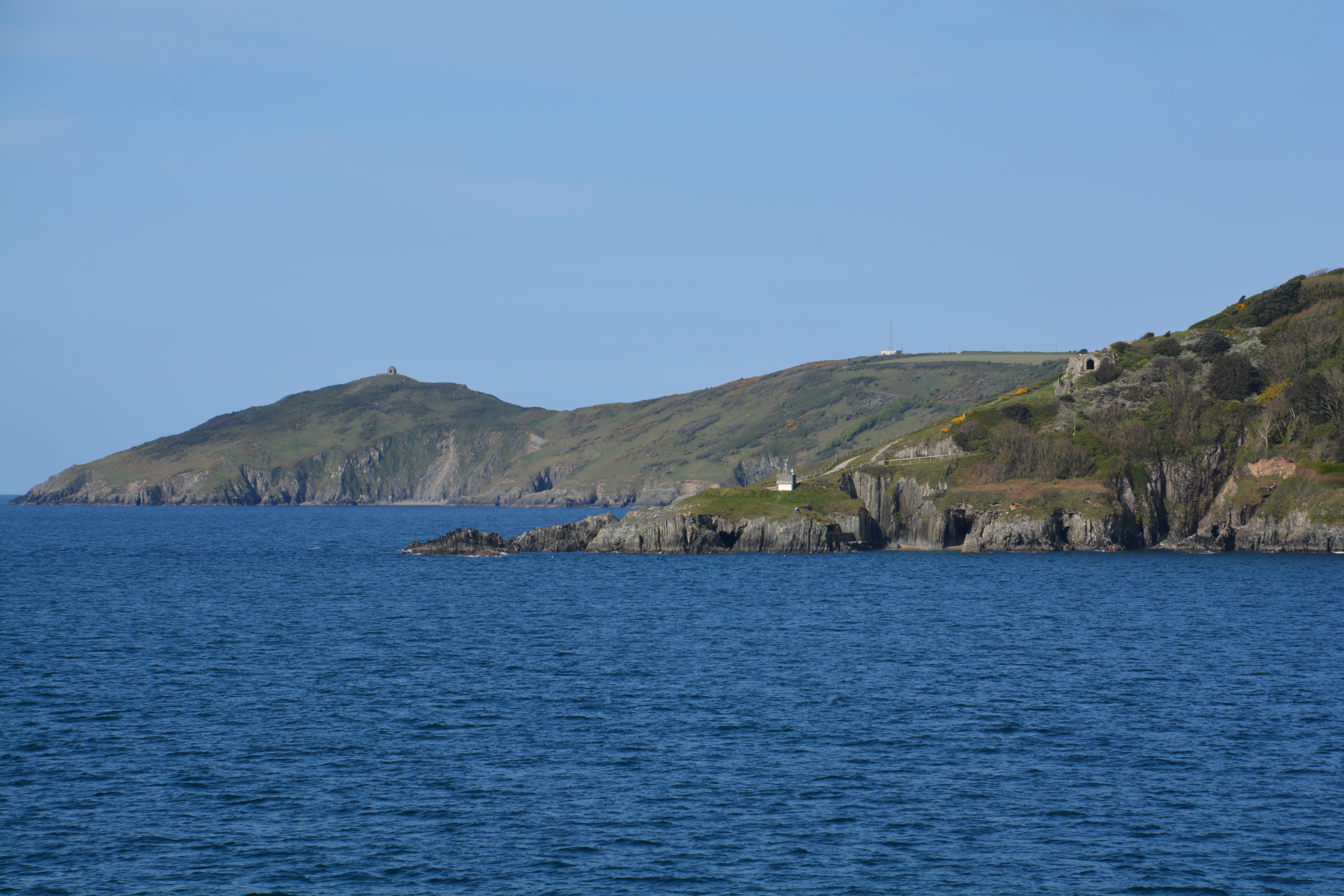
- Penlee Point in 2017
- Interactive map of Penlee Point
- Coordinates: 50°19′05″N 4°11′20″W
- Location: Rame, Cornwall, UK

Penlee Point (Cornish: Penn Legh, lit. 'stone-slab headland') is a coastal headland in Mount Edgcumbe Country Park, Maker-with-Rame, Cornwall, UK. The point lies at the entrance to Plymouth Sound. Bordering the sea, there is a weather station at its end.

== Historical locations ==
Above the point, a little below the Coastal Path, is Queen Adelaide's Chapel (or Grotto), an eyecatcher built in 1827 to commemorate the visit of King William IV and Queen Adelaide to Mount Edgcumbe. The Chapel was used as a lookout in the 1920s by Plymouth's dockworkers to identify incoming and outgoing merchant ships. Penlee Battery is the former site of a fort, and is now a nature reserve.

== See also ==
- Penlee Point, Mousehole
