= Hamoaze =

Section of the River Tamar in southwest England

Hamoaze An Leysek
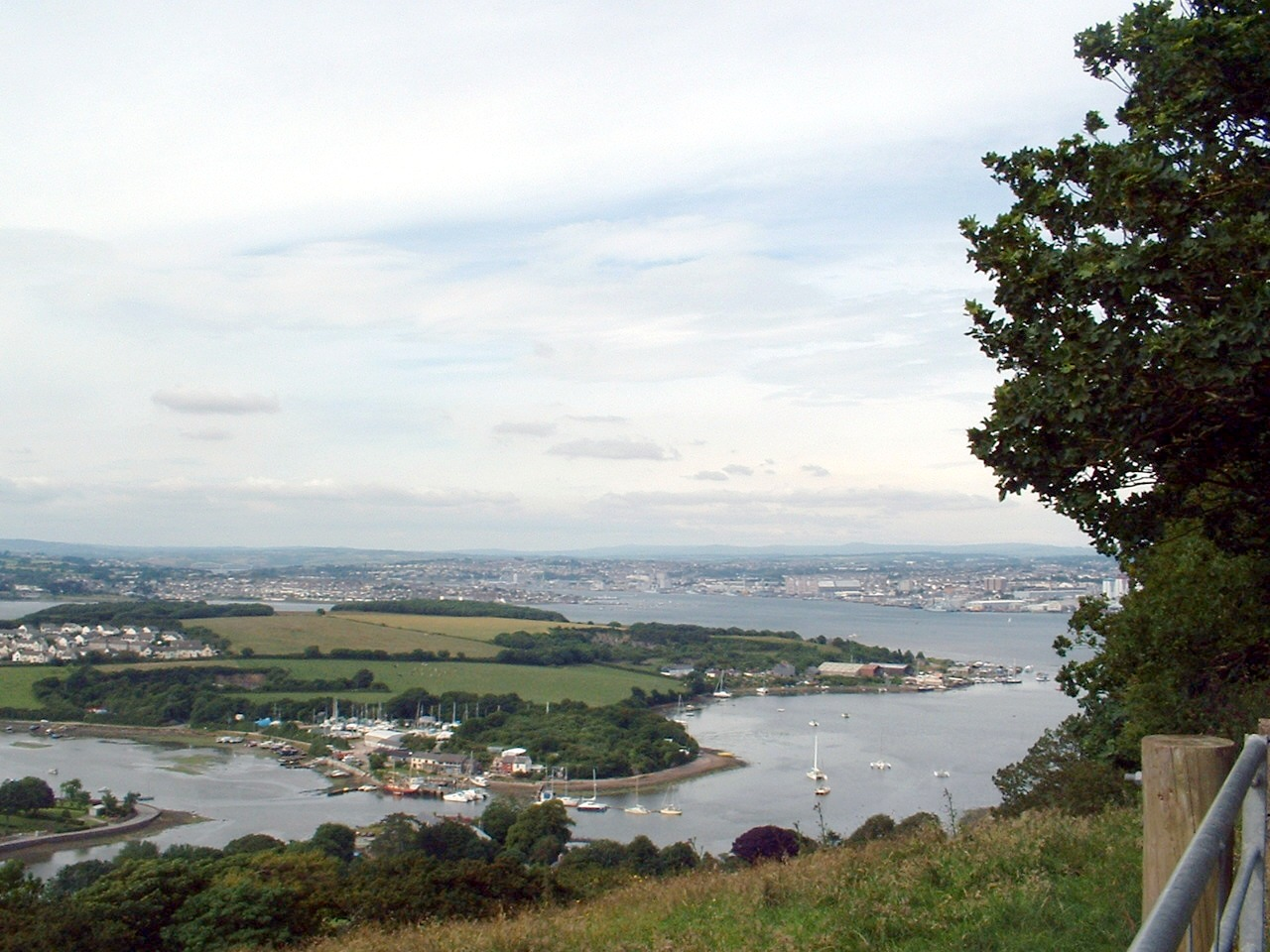
- Devonport Dockyard and the Hamoaze from the Rame Peninsula, Cornwall

Physical characteristics
- Mouth: Plymouth Sound
  - coordinates: 50°23′44″N 4°12′28″W

Basin features
- Tributaries
  - left: St John's Lake; Millbrook Lake
- Inland ports: HMNB Devonport

The Hamoaze (/hæmˈoʊz/; Cornish dialect pronunciation: [ˈhɒmøz]) (Cornish: An Leysek, meaning the muddy place) is an estuarine stretch of the English tidal River Tamar, between its confluence with the River Lynher and Plymouth Sound.

== Etymology ==
The name first appears as ryver of Hamose in 1588. The first element is thought to refer specifically to Ham in the parish of Weston Peverel, now a suburb of Plymouth (whose name in turn came from the Old English word hamm, meaning "water-meadow, land in the bend of a river"). The second element is thought to derive from Old English wāse meaning "mud" (as in "ooze"). Thus the name once meant "mud-banks at Ham". The name originally probably applied only to a creek running past Ham, which perhaps consisted of mud-banks at low tide, north of the present-day Devonport Dockyard. The name later came to be used for the main channel of the estuary into which the creek drained.

== Geography ==
The Hamoaze flows past Devonport Dockyard, which is one of three major bases of the Royal Navy today. The presence of large numbers of small watercraft is a challenge and hazard to the warships using the naval base and dockyard. Navigation on the waterway is controlled by the King's Harbour Master for Plymouth.

Settlements on the banks of the Hamoaze are Saltash, Wilcove, Torpoint and Cremyll in Cornwall, as well as Devonport and Plymouth in Devon.

Two regular ferry services crossing the Hamoaze exist: the Torpoint Ferry (a chain ferry that takes vehicles) and the Cremyll Ferry (passengers and cyclists only).

A street in Torpoint bears the name Hamoaze Road, named after the stretch of river.

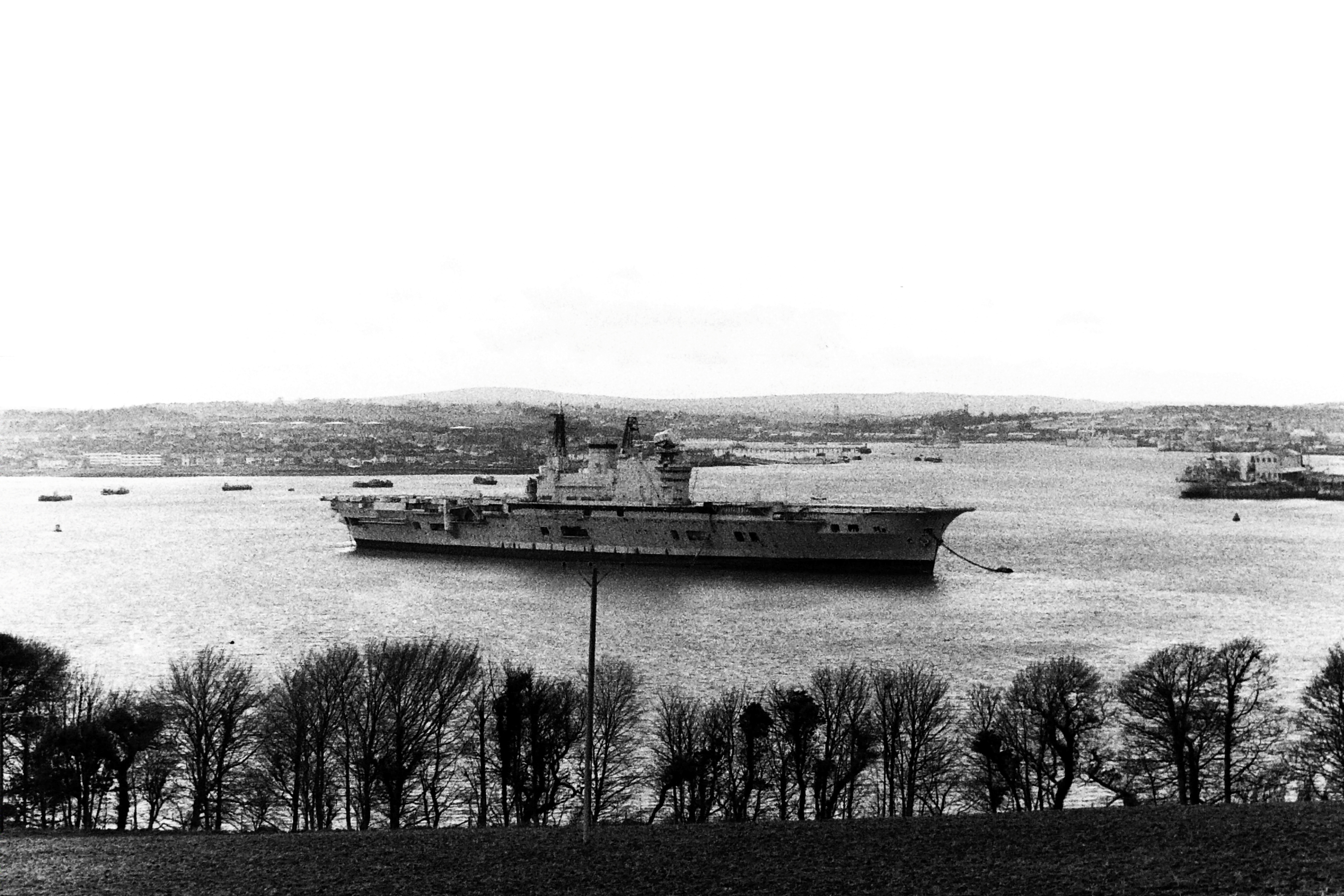
HMS Eagle laid up in the Hamoaze in January 1973

== See also ==
- Tamar-Tavy Estuary
