= Cremyll =

Village in Cornwall, England

Coordinates: 50.3605°N 4.1758°W

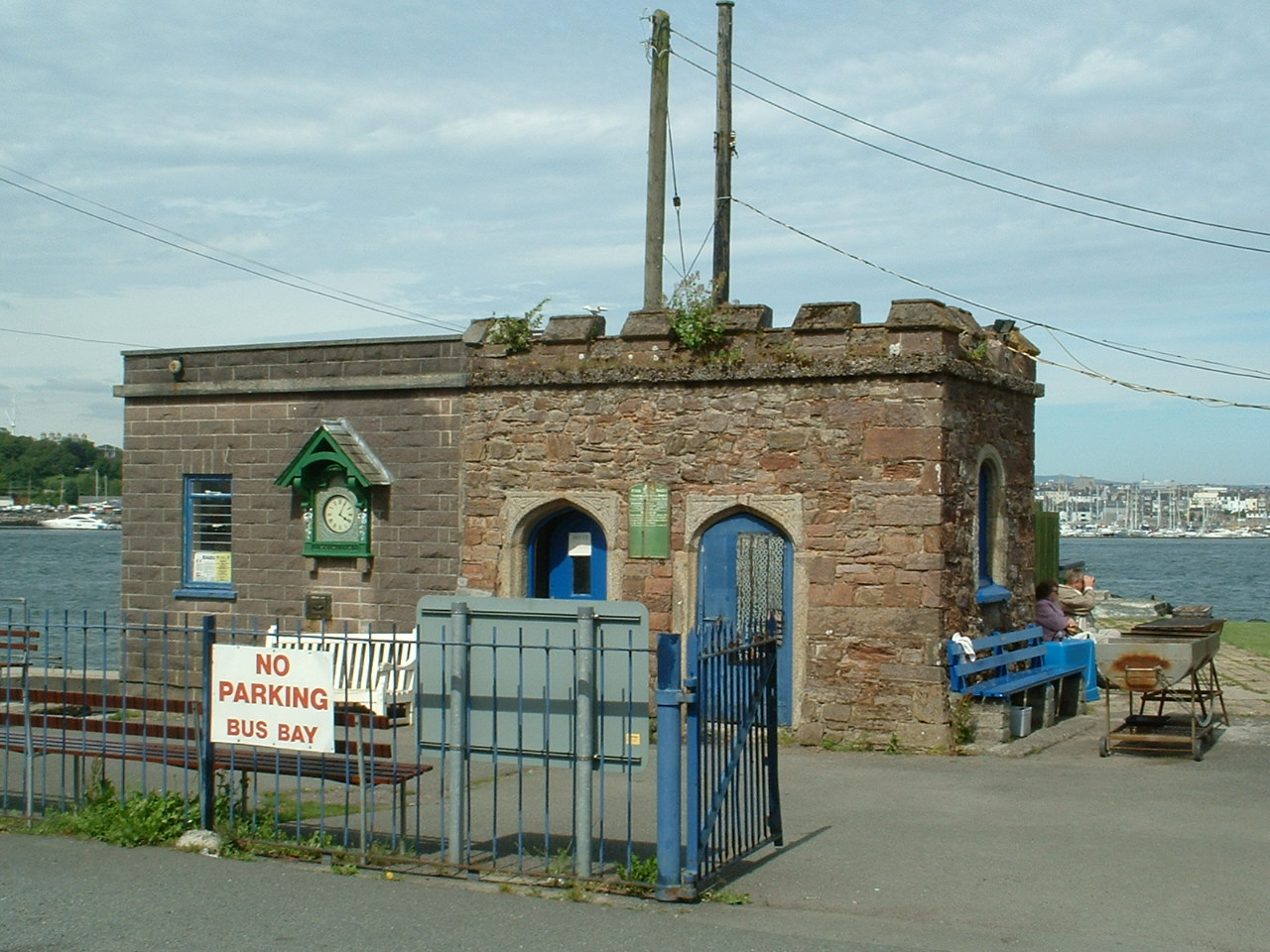
- Cremyll Ferry ticket office

- Location within Cornwall
- OS grid reference: SX453535
- Civil parish: Maker-with-Rame
- Unitary authority: Cornwall
- Ceremonial county: Cornwall
- Region: South West
- Country: England
- Sovereign state: United Kingdom
- Post town: TORPOINT
- Postcode district: PL10
- Dialling code: 01752
- Police: Devon and Cornwall
- Fire: Cornwall
- Ambulance: South Western
- UK Parliament: South East Cornwall

Cremyll (pronounced /ˈkrɛməl/) is a small coastal village in the civil parish of Maker-with-Rame, in south-east Cornwall, England, United Kingdom. Cremyll is on the Rame Peninsula facing Plymouth Sound. The village is about 9 miles by road or 0.5 miles by boat from Plymouth.

== History ==
There has been a ferry at Cremyll since the 11th century and it was a link in the main southern route into Cornwall until the 1830s. In medieval times the ferry was part of the manor of Stone-House, held by the Valletorts. There was a larger community called West Stonehouse (compare with East Stonehouse) until it was burnt by the French in 1350.

Land on the Rame Peninsula was the earliest to be granted to an Anglo-Saxon Landholder as King Geraint of Dumnonia granted land at 'Magor' or Maker to the Abbey of Sherborne. However the area likely remained in Cornish control after Athelstan set the modern border at the Tamar in the 10th Century. An area of the Rame Peninsula, (up to Kingsand) remained as part of Devon until 1844, when it was made part of Cornwall. The village is on the most easterly extension of the Rame Peninsula, known as the "Forgotten Corner."

== Culture and community ==
Today the Cremyll Ferry carries foot passengers and cyclists from Cremyll to Plymouth. Cremyll is on the South West Coast Path which is the longest of the waymarked long-distance footpaths in England.

Cremyll Road in Torpoint and Cremyll Road in Reading are named after the Cremyll settlement.

The Edgcumbe Arms, an inn which dates back to the 17th century, was destroyed by fire and rebuilt in 1995.

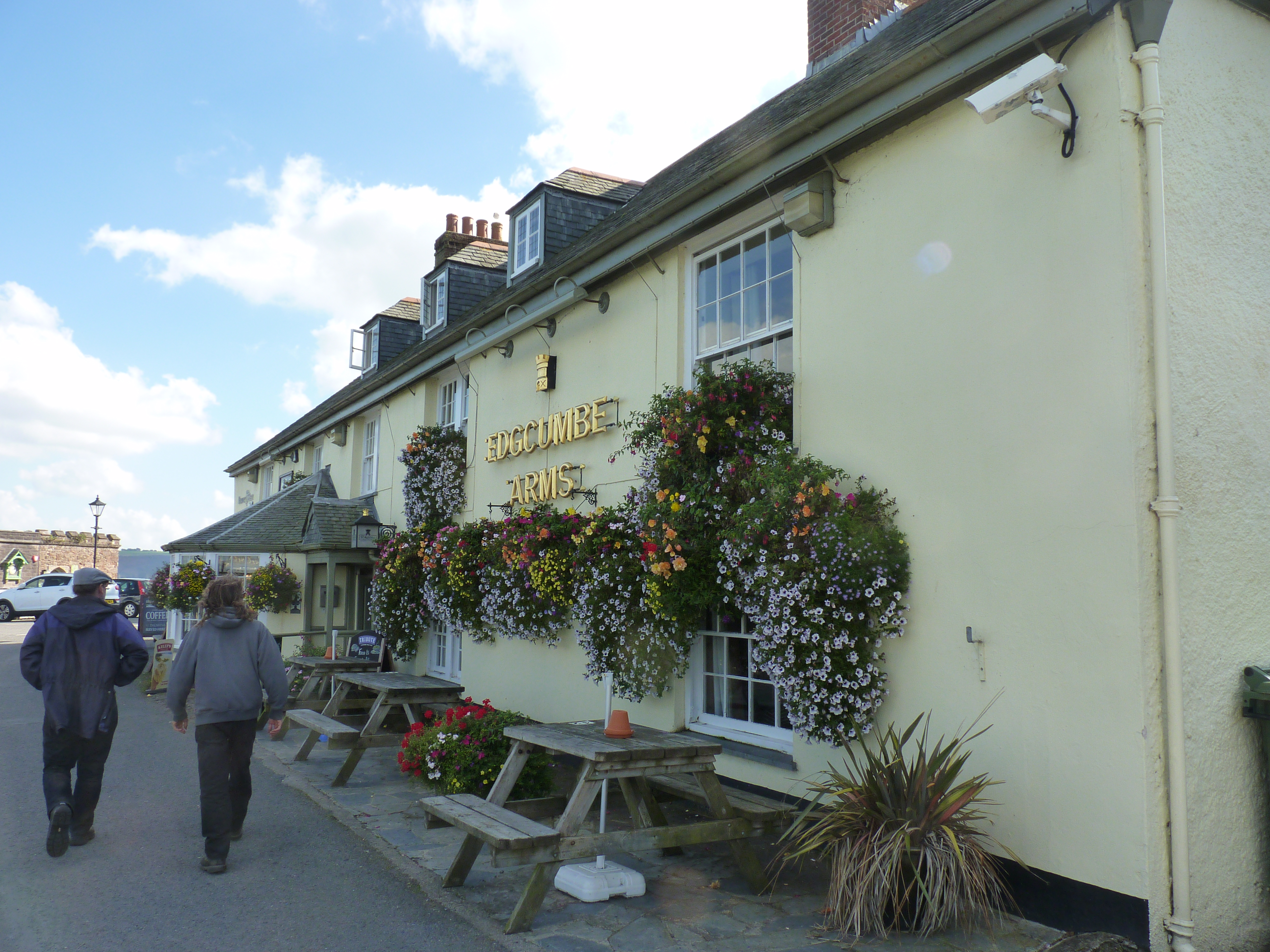
Edgecumbe Arms (2015)

Cremyll's former schoolroom and chapel was built at the expense of William Edgcumbe in 1867. It is now a private residence, the Old School Rooms.

== Landmarks ==
The main entrance to Mount Edgcumbe House is in Cremyll. Mount Edgcumbe House is a stately home and a Grade II listed building, whilst the gardens are listed as Grade I in the Register of Parks and Gardens of Special Historic Interest in England. Cremyll has a pay and display car park operated by Cornwall Council with about 50 spaces, mainly there for visitors to Mount Edgcumbe Country Park.
