= Rame Head =

Headland on the south coast of Cornwall, England

Coordinates: 50.311°N 4.223°W

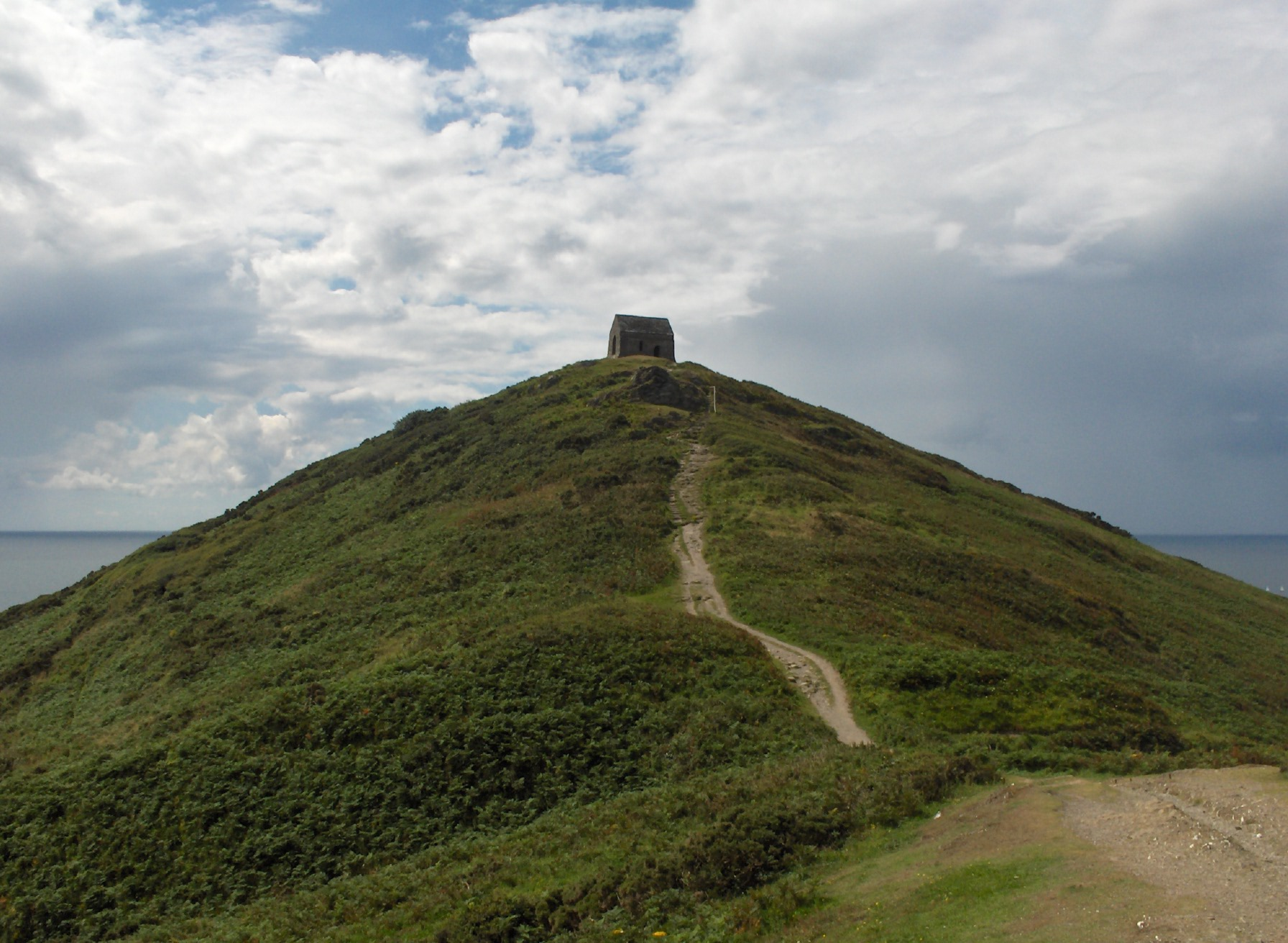
Rame Head from the land

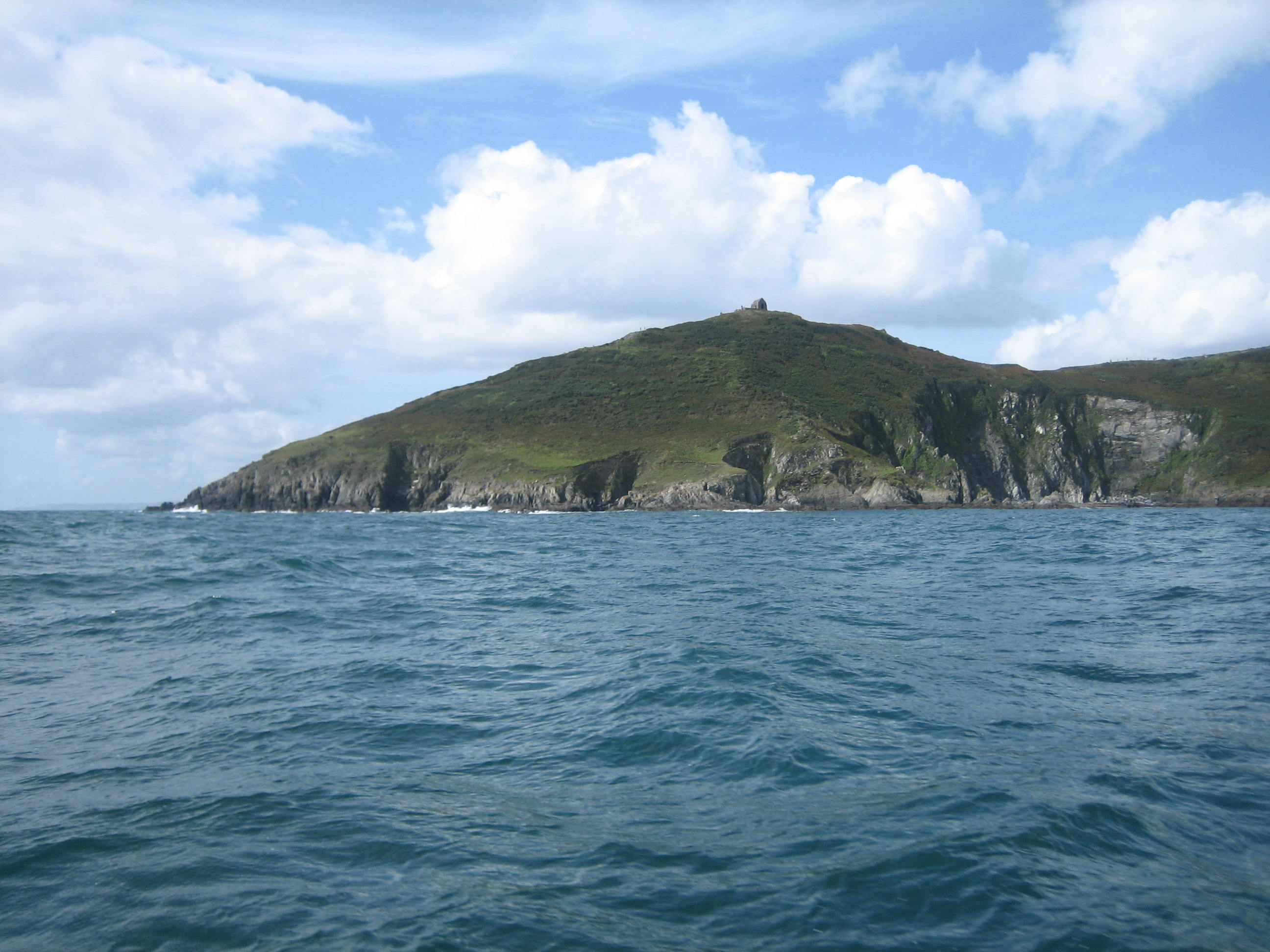
Rame Head from the sea

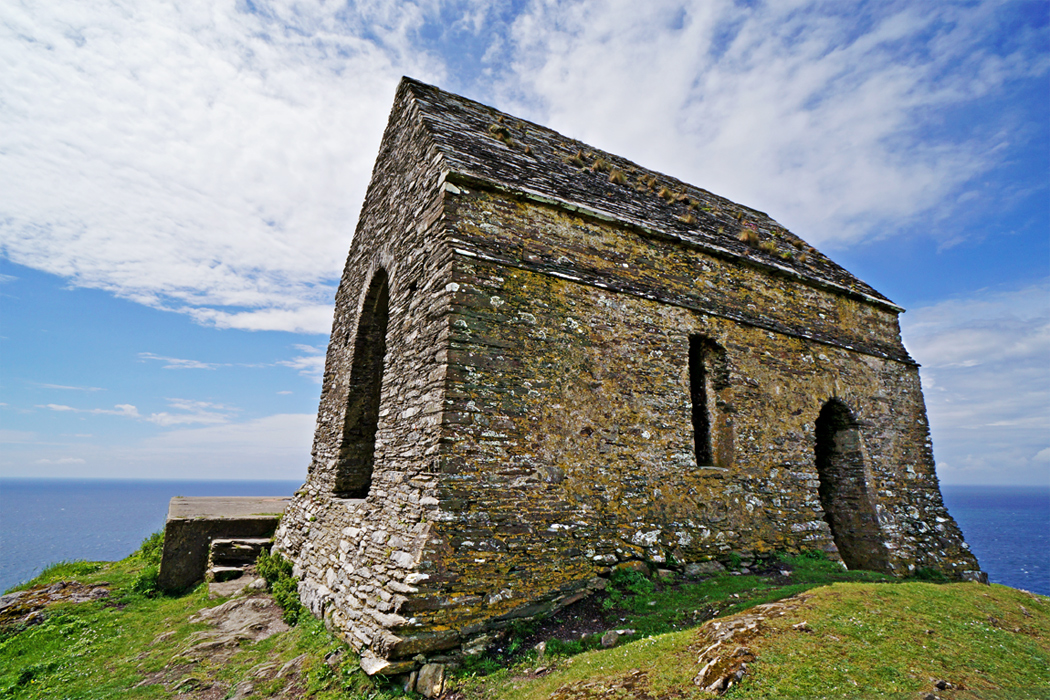
The chapel at Rame Head

Rame Head or Ram Head (Cornish: Penn an Hordh) is a coastal headland, southwest of the village of Rame in southeast Cornwall, England, United Kingdom. It is part of the larger Rame Peninsula (Cornish: Gorenys Rama).

== History and antiquities ==
The natural site was used for a promontory fort ('cliff castle') in the Iron Age and the narrow neck of land was further excavated on the landward side with a central causeway, still visible. The eastern part retains traces of round house platforms, though damaged by wartime construction. The headland has a prominent chapel, dedicated to St Michael, as are many early Christian headland sites in the region, accessible by a steep footpath.

The chapel was first licensed for Mass in 1397 and is on the site of a much earlier and ancient, Celtic, hermitage. It remains as an intact shell and was originally lime-washed so that it stood out on the headland. Ordwulf, who was the owner of vast estates in the West Country and was the uncle of King Ethelred the Unready, gave Rame to Tavistock Abbey (which Ordwulf had founded) in 981, meaning the parish was technically in Devon until the modern period.

During the tail days of the second world war, A Beachy Head-class repair ship called HMS Rame Head was put into service, which was in service until 2009.

== Rame Head in modern times ==
Around the head, Dartmoor ponies are kept to graze. This area is also frequented by deer, sheep and cattle which can often be viewed from the sea. Due to its exceptionally high and panoramic vantage point, there is a volunteer National Coastwatch Institution lookout on the top of the headland (next to the car park). Rame Head is a part of Mount Edgcumbe House and Country Park which is jointly owned and run by Cornwall Council and Plymouth City Council.

The headland is prominent to sailors and fishermen leaving Plymouth through Plymouth Sound. It is often the last piece of land they see leaving England, and the first they see when returning home; Rame Head thus appears in the sea shanty "Spanish Ladies".

The headland forms part of Rame Head & Whitsand Bay SSSI (Site of Special Scientific Interest), noted for its geological as well as biological interest. The SSSI contains 2 species on the Red Data Book of rare and endangered plant species; early meadow-grass (poa infirma) and slender bird’s-foot-trefoil (from the lotus genus). Both the National Trust and the Ministry of Defence own land within Rame Head & Whitsand Bay SSSI (the protected area includes part of the military training area called Tregantle Ranges).

== See also ==
- Maker, Cornwall
