= Crafthole =

Coordinates: 50°21′54″N 4°18′00″W

Crafthole: Cornish: Toll an Kroft
- Village
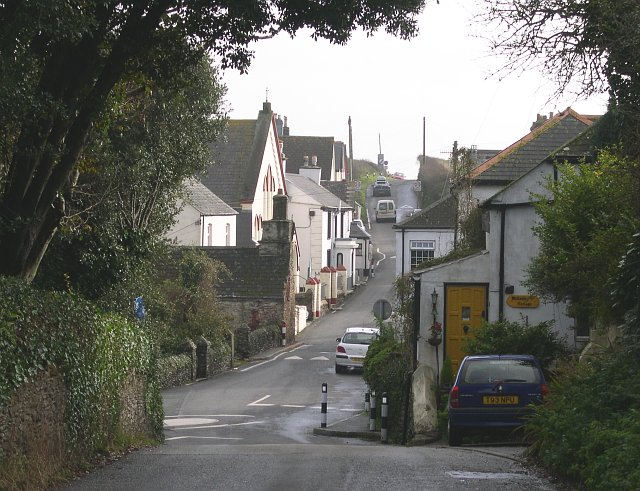

- Location within Cornwall
- Civil parish: Sheviock
- Unitary authority: Cornwall
- Ceremonial county: Cornwall
- Region: South West
- Country: England
- Sovereign state: United Kingdom
- Post town: TORPOINT
- Postcode district: PL11
- Dialling code: 01503
- Police: Devon and Cornwall
- Fire: Cornwall
- Ambulance: South Western
- UK Parliament: South East Cornwall

Crafthole (Cornish: Toll an Kroft) is a village in the parish of Sheviock, in southeast Cornwall, England. The village has a pub, the Finnygook Inn, community shop, former Methodist chapel, and village hall.

== History ==
Crafthole in the late 19th century, was notorious for smuggling rum which was very valuable. The smugglers used the harbour of Portwrinkle to dock the boats, from which the rum was offloaded and taken up the steep hill connecting the two villages to Crafthole. One of the prime places the rum was stored was in the room below the Methodist chapel which was built in 1867.

== Landmarks ==
A stone cross stands by the side of the road. It was first recorded in 1858 as a cross without a base. By 1896 it was standing on a base; in the 1950s it was removed to the side of the road from its previous site in the middle. Crafthole was granted a weekly market in 1315; it has been suggested that this cross was the market cross.
