= PL postcode area =

Postcode area within the United Kingdom

Plymouth
- Postcode area
- Coordinates: 50.432°N 4.337°W
- Country: United Kingdom
- Postcode area: PL
- Postcode area name: Plymouth
- Post towns: 25
- Postcode districts: 36
- Postcode sectors: 99
- Postcodes (live): 17,524
- Postcodes (total): 22,439
- Statistics as at May 2020

The PL postcode area, also known as the Plymouth postcode area, is a group of 35 postcode districts in South West England, within 25 post towns. These cover west Devon (including Plymouth, Tavistock, Ivybridge, Yelverton and Lifton) and east Cornwall (including St Austell, Bodmin, Liskeard, Launceston, Looe, Saltash, Torpoint, Callington, Wadebridge, Boscastle, Calstock, Camelford, Delabole, Fowey, Gunnislake, Lostwithiel, Padstow, Par, Port Isaac and Tintagel).

== Coverage ==
The approximate coverage of the postal districts:

Postcode district	Post town	Coverage	Local authority area(s)
PL1	PLYMOUTH	Plymouth City Centre, Barbican, Devonport, The Hoe, Millbridge, Stoke, Stonehouse	Plymouth City Council
PL2	PLYMOUTH	Beacon Park, Ford, Keyham, North Prospect, Pennycross, Home Park	Plymouth City Council
PL3	PLYMOUTH	Efford, Hartley, Laira, Mannamead, Milehouse, Peverell, Higher Compton	Plymouth City Council
PL4	PLYMOUTH	Lipson, Mount Gould, Mutley, Greenbank, Prince Rock, St. Judes, Barbican (north)	Plymouth City Council
PL5	PLYMOUTH	Crownhill, Ernesettle, Honicknowle, Whitleigh, St. Budeaux, Tamerton Foliot	Plymouth City Council
PL6	PLYMOUTH	Derriford, Eggbuckland, Estover, Leigham, Roborough, Southway; Lopwell, Woolwell, Bickleigh	Plymouth City Council; South Hams
PL7	PLYMOUTH	Plympton, Sparkwell	Plymouth City Council; South Hams
PL8	PLYMOUTH	Brixton, Newton Ferrers, Noss Mayo, Yealmpton	South Hams
PL9	PLYMOUTH	Plymstock, Heybrook Bay, Mount Batten, Wembury	Plymouth City Council
PL10	TORPOINT	Cawsand, Cremyll, Fort Picklecombe, Freathy, Kingsand, Millbrook	Cornwall Council
PL11	TORPOINT	Torpoint, Antony, Crafthole, Downderry, Seaton, Sheviock, St John	Cornwall Council
PL12	SALTASH	Saltash, Hatt, Landrake, St Germans, Tideford, Trerulefoot	Cornwall Council
PL13	LOOE	Looe, Lansallos, Polperro	Cornwall Council
PL14	LISKEARD	Liskeard, Dobwalls, Doublebois, Minions, St Cleer, St Ive, St Neot	Cornwall Council
PL15	LAUNCESTON	Launceston, Bolventor, Lezant, South Petherwin, Treneglos	Cornwall Council, Torridge
PL16	LIFTON	Lifton, Broadwoodwidger, Marystow	West Devon, Torridge
PL17	CALLINGTON	Callington, Ashton, Bray Shop, Kelly Bray, South Hill	Cornwall Council
PL18	CALSTOCK	Calstock	Cornwall Council
PL18	GUNNISLAKE	Gunnislake, Albaston	Cornwall Council
PL19	TAVISTOCK	Tavistock, Bradstone, Mary Tavy, Morwellham, Peter Tavy, Whitchurch	West Devon
PL20	YELVERTON	Yelverton, Bellever, Crapstone, Horrabridge, Postbridge, Princetown, Two Bridges	West Devon
PL21	IVYBRIDGE	Ivybridge, Brownston, Cornwood, Ermington, Modbury, Ugborough	South Hams
PL22	LOSTWITHIEL	Lostwithiel, Boconnoc, Lanlivery, Lerryn, St Veep	Cornwall Council
PL23	FOWEY	Fowey, Bodinnick, Golant, Polruan	Cornwall Council
PL24	PAR	Par, Polkerris, St Blazey, Tywardreath	Cornwall Council
PL25	ST. AUSTELL	St Austell, Carlyon Bay, Charlestown, Trewoon	Cornwall Council
PL26	ST. AUSTELL	East Portholland, Foxhole, Gorran Haven, Mevagissey, Polgooth, Roche, St Dennis, St Ewe, Sticker	Cornwall Council
PL27	WADEBRIDGE	Wadebridge, Little Petherick, Polzeath, Rock, St Eval, St Minver, Trebetherick	Cornwall Council
PL28	PADSTOW	Padstow, Crugmeer, Porthcothan, St Merryn, Trevone, Treyarnon	Cornwall Council
PL29	PORT ISAAC	Port Isaac, Port Gaverne, Port Quin, St Endellion, Trelights	Cornwall Council
PL30	BODMIN	Blisland, Lanivet, Luxulyan, Nanstallon, St Kew, St Mabyn, Temple, Withiel	Cornwall Council
PL31	BODMIN	Bodmin, Dunmere	Cornwall Council
PL32	CAMELFORD	Camelford, Davidstow, Lanteglos-by-Camelford, Otterham, Tresinney	Cornwall Council
PL33	DELABOLE	Delabole, Trebarwith, Westdowns	Cornwall Council
PL34	TINTAGEL	Tintagel, Bossiney, Trewarmett	Cornwall Council
PL35	BOSCASTLE	Boscastle, Lesnewth, Trevalga	Cornwall Council
PL95	PLYMOUTH		non-geographic

== Map ==
PL postcode area map, showing postcode districts in red and post towns in grey text, with links to nearby EX, TQ and TR postcode areas.

== See also ==
- Postcode Address File
- List of postcode areas in the United Kingdom
