= Sheviock =

Civil parish in Cornwall, England

Coordinates: 50.373°N 4.294°W

Sheviock: Cornish: Seviek
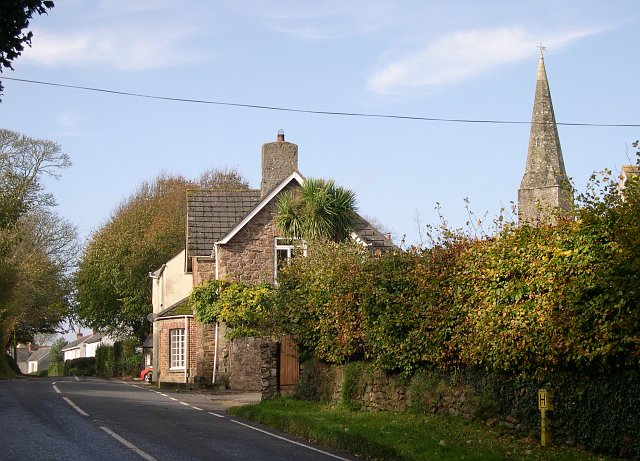

- Location within Cornwall
- Population: 646 (2011)
- OS grid reference: SX 369 551
- Civil parish: Sheviock
- Unitary authority: Cornwall
- Ceremonial county: Cornwall
- Region: South West
- Country: England
- Sovereign state: United Kingdom
- Post town: TORPOINT
- Postcode district: PL11
- Dialling code: 01503
- Police: Devon and Cornwall
- Fire: Cornwall
- Ambulance: South Western
- UK Parliament: South East Cornwall

Sheviock (Cornish: Seviek, meaning strawberry bed) is a coastal civil parish and a hamlet in south-east Cornwall, England, United Kingdom. The parish is two miles (3 km) south of St Germans and three miles (5 km) south-west of Saltash.

Sheviock parish is in the St Germans Registration District and the population in the 2001 census was 683, which had decreased to 646 at the 2011 census. To the north, the parish is bordered by St Germans Creek (the tidal estuary of the River Tiddy, a tributary of the Lynher River) and to the south by the English Channel. To the east, Sheviock is bordered by Antony parish and to the west by Deviock parish.

== Landmarks ==
The parish church of St Mary stands in the hamlet of Sheviock at grid reference SX 370 550: the building is of the 13th, 14th and 15th centuries. The church is one of only a few in Cornwall to have a spire. Two late 14th-century tombs are thought to be of three members of the Courtenay family. There is stained glass by Wailes to the designs of George Edmund Street who restored the church in 1850. The restoration included rebuilding and reroofing the chancel.

There is a Cornish cross, known as Stump Cross, at a crossroads between Sheviock churchtown and Crafthole.

Trethill is an Italianate villa designed by George Wightwick and built in 1836-40. Trewin is small square house of c. 1750 built of bricks with a set of Doric pilasters on its front. To the original house a plain extension of similar proportions was added in the 19th century. Trethill House is a country house, which was the seat of the Wallis family in the 18th century.
