= Cawsand =

Twin villages in Cornwall, England

Cawsand: Cornish: Porthbugh
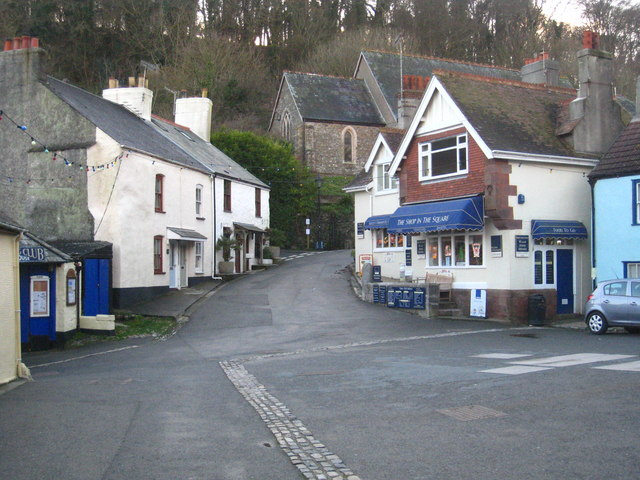
- The Square, Cawsand

- Location within Cornwall
- OS grid reference: SX434502
- Civil parish: Maker-with-Rame
- Unitary authority: Cornwall
- Ceremonial county: Cornwall
- Region: South West
- Country: England
- Sovereign state: United Kingdom
- Post town: TORPOINT
- Postcode district: PL10
- Dialling code: 01752
- Police: Devon and Cornwall
- Fire: Cornwall
- Ambulance: South Western
- UK Parliament: South East Cornwall

Cawsand (Cornish: Porthbugh; lit. Cow Cove) and Kingsand (Cornish: Porthruw) are twin villages in southeast Cornwall, England, United Kingdom. The village is situated on the Rame Peninsula and is in the parish of Maker-with-Rame.

Cawsand overlooks Plymouth Sound and adjoins Kingsand, formerly on the border of Devon and Cornwall (the border has since been moved and now is situated on the River Tamar). Cawsand has two public houses: the Cross Keys Inn and The Bay.

There is a bus service and a seasonal ferry service to Plymouth. Cawsand has a pilot gig club (Rame Gig Club).

Cawsand is within Mount Edgcumbe Country Park. The Rame Peninsula is considered part of the Forgotten Corner of Cornwall.

== Geology ==
Cawsand Beach is sand and shingle with a network of rockpools and is found along The Bound.

== History ==
The settlement is first recorded in 1404.

In 1596, local militia repelled an attack by Spanish forces and defences were built soon after. Cawsand Fort (at 50°19′56″N 4°12′9″W) is sited just above the village. The fort is an 1860s Royal Commission on the Defence of the United Kingdom fort built on the site of a 1779 battery to mount about 10 guns to cover the western entrance to Plymouth Sound by the breakwater. Released by the Ministry of Defence in 1926, it remained derelict until it was converted into residential accommodation.

Correspondence from 1801 to 1803 shows that Admiral Nelson had stayed in Cawsand and it is rumoured that he had dined at the Ship Inn, which burned down in 2013 after several years of abandonment. The site has been cleared and is now being rebuilt by The Peninsula Trust which plans to turn the site into a cafe and affordable housing.

== Religion ==
St Andrew's Church was built as a chapel of ease in 1877–78. It is a Grade II listed building.

Originally built in 1793, Cawsand also has a Congregational Church.

== Notable people ==
- John Pollard, Royal Navy officer
- Thomas Ball Sullivan, Royal Navy officer
- Daniel Tyerman, missionary

== Twinning ==
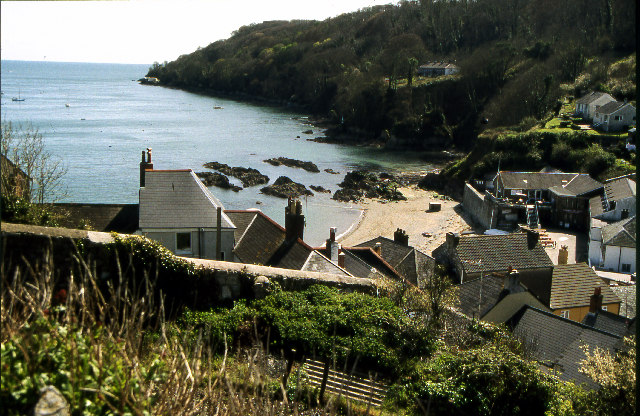
Cawsand village and beach

Cawsand is twinned with Porspoder in Brittany, France.
