= Antony, Cornwall =

Village and civil parish in Cornwall, England

Coordinates: 50.370°N 4.252°W

Antony: Cornish: Anton
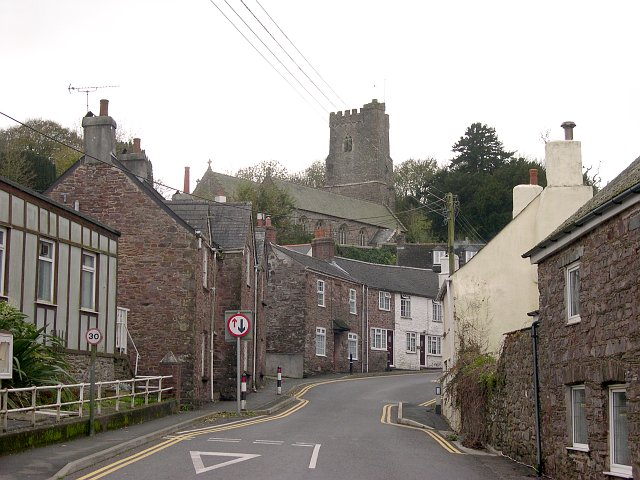
- Antony village and parish church

- Location within Cornwall
- Population: 438 (Parish, 2021)
- OS grid reference: SX 399 547
- Civil parish: Antony
- Unitary authority: Cornwall
- Ceremonial county: Cornwall
- Region: South West
- Country: England
- Sovereign state: United Kingdom
- Post town: TORPOINT
- Postcode district: PL11
- Dialling code: 01752
- Police: Devon and Cornwall
- Fire: Cornwall
- Ambulance: South Western
- UK Parliament: South East Cornwall

Antony (Cornish: Anton (village) or Pluw Anton (parish)) is a village and coastal civil parish in Cornwall, England, United Kingdom.

The village is situated on the Rame Peninsula about three miles west of Torpoint and has a shop, a pub and a garage. At the 2021 census the population of the parish was 438.

== Toponymy ==
There are two possible etymologies of Antony: the first is that it is named in honour of St Anthony; the second is that it comes from the Anglicisation of the Cornish Tre- (“farmstead”) and -Anta (personal name)

== Geography ==
Antony parish is bounded to the north by the tidal River Lynher (also known as the St Germans River) and to the south by the English Channel coast. To the east, the parish is bordered by Torpoint and St John parishes and to the west by Sheviock parish.

Apart from the church town, Antony, the only settlement of any size is Wilcove. Scraesdon Fort, Wolsdon House and Antony House are also in the parish.

== History ==
At the time of Domesday Book (1086) the manor of Antony was held by Ermenhald from Tavistock Abbey.

Torpoint was historically part of the parish of Antony. Torpoint became a separate ecclesiastical parish from Antony in 1873 and a separate civil parish in 1904.

== Parish church ==
The medieval parish church, dedicated to St James in 1259, includes structural elements from the 13th, 14th and 15th centuries. The church houses memorials to members of the Carew family of Antony (18th century) and a large monumental brass to Margery Arundell, 1420.

== Notable residents ==
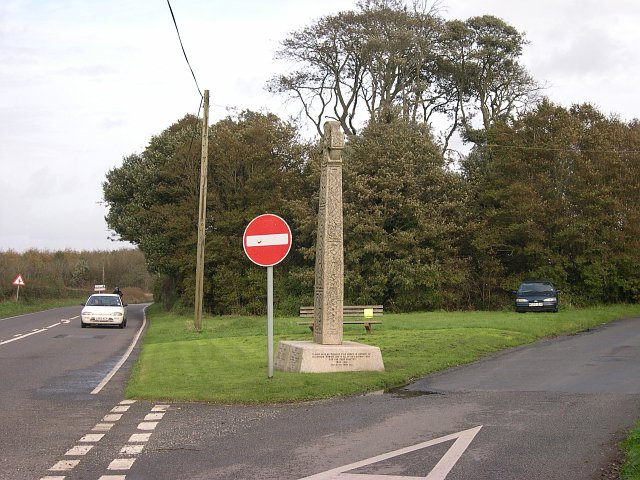
Antony war memorial

- Richard Carew (1555–1620), antiquary, historian and writer.
- Sir George Carew (1556-1612), diplomat, historian and MP.
- Sir Richard Carew, 1st Baronet (ca. 1580–1643), writer and MP.
- Sir Alexander Carew (1609–1644), soldier and politician executed for treason.
- John Carew (1622–1660), signatory of Charles I's death warrant, also executed for treason.
- Francis Arundell (1780–1846), antiquarian, orientalist and clergyman.
- Sir George Richards (1820–1896) was Hydrographer of the Navy from 1863 to 1874.
- Charlotte Carew Pole, women's rights advocate
- Sir Richard Carew Pole, 13th Baronet (1938–2024), British aristocrat, holder of the Pole baronetcy, lived at Antony House

== Twinning ==
Antony is twinned with Benodet (Benoded) in Brittany, France.
