= Freathy =

Coordinates: 50.3464°N 4.2521°W

Freathy: Cornish: Frydhi
- Location within Cornwall
- OS grid reference: SX398521
- Shire county: Cornwall
- Region: South West
- Country: England
- Sovereign state: United Kingdom
- Post town: TORPOINT
- Postcode district: PL10
- Dialling code: 01752
- Police: Devon and Cornwall
- Fire: Cornwall
- Ambulance: South Western
- UK Parliament: South East Cornwall

Freathy (Cornish: Frydhi) is a beach and coastal settlement on the Rame Peninsula in east Cornwall, England, United Kingdom.

Freathy is accessible by the coast road along which runs the South West Coast Path. The majority of dwellings are north of the road on the plateau above Freathy Cliffs, while some chalets are sporadically situated on the cliffside above the beach below.

During the summer, the beach is popular with visiting tourists
