= Fortifications of Plymouth =

Coordinates: 50°21′52.88″N 4°8′15.32″W

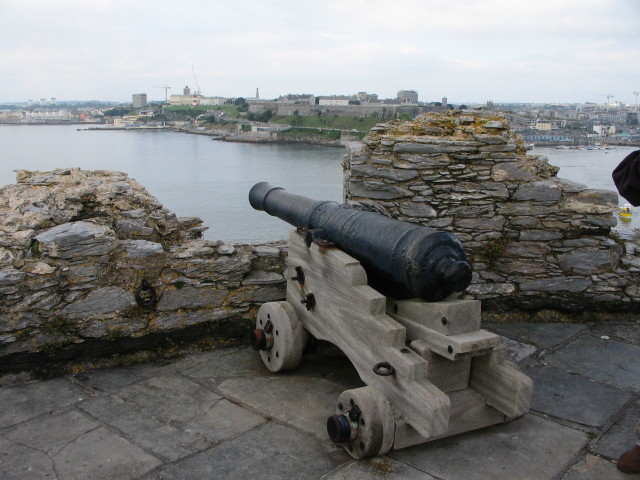
The Royal Citadel, Plymouth, viewed from Mount Batten Tower.

The fortifications of Plymouth in Devon are extensive due to its natural harbour, its commanding position on the Western Approaches and its role as the United Kingdom's largest naval base. The first medieval defences were built to defend Sutton Harbour on the eastern side of Plymouth Sound at the mouth of the River Plym, but by the 18th century, naval activity had begun to shift westward to Devonport at the mouth of the River Tamar. During the Victorian era, advances in military technology led to a huge programme of fortification encompassing the whole of Plymouth Sound together with the overland approaches. Many of these works remained in military use well into the 20th century.

== Medieval fortifications ==
At the time of the Norman Conquest, Plymouth was a tiny settlement at Sutton Harbour, but in 1295 and 1357, royal expeditions to France had used Plymouth as a final gathering place before making the crossing. In 1377, a murage grant was received to fund its fortification, although what form these works took is unknown.

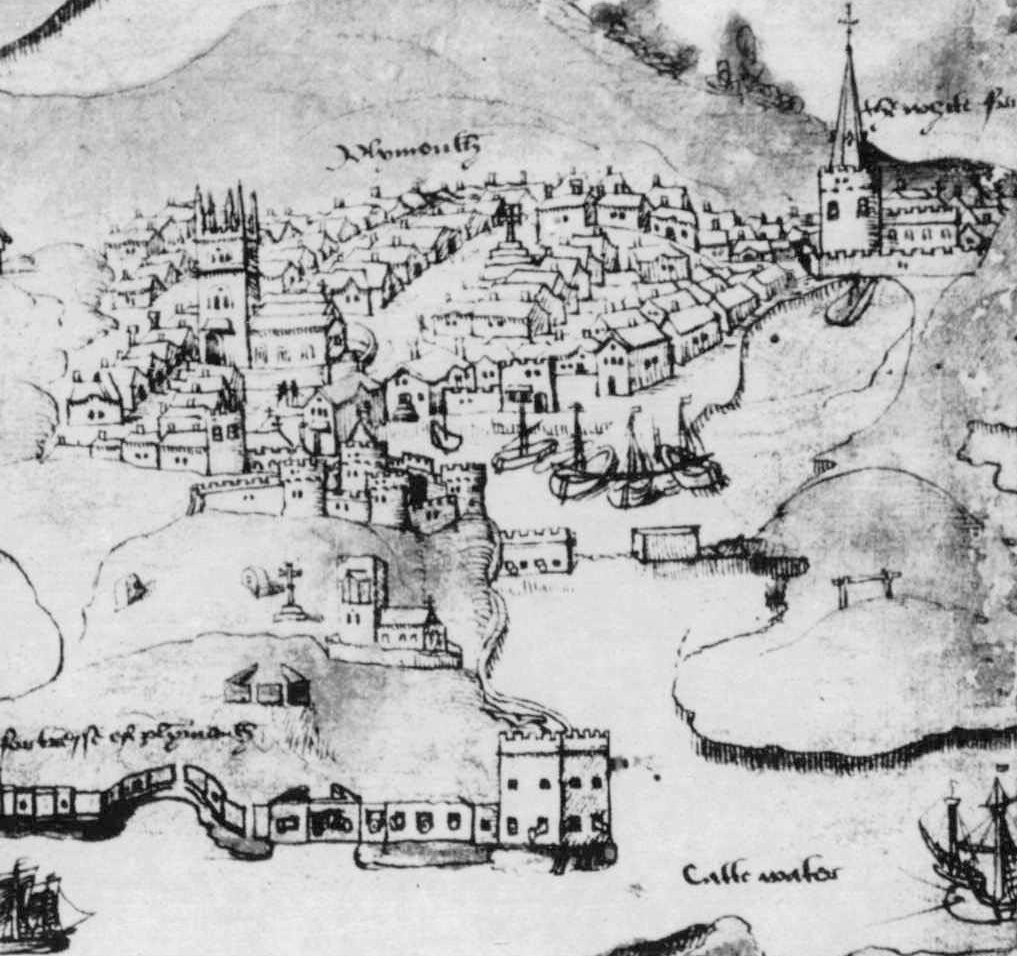
A depiction of the town and fortifications of Plymouth around Sutton Pool, from a chart dated 1540. The Fisher's Nose Blockhouse is in the centre foreground and behind it can be seen the Royal Chapel of St Katherine-upon-the-Hoe, Plymouth Castle and the Barbican with a harbour chain.

=== Plymouth Castle ===
Following a French raid on Plymouth in August 1403, King Henry IV ordered the prior of Plympton and the abbot of Tavistock to further fortify the town with walls and towers. The eventual result of this was a castle with four towers overlooking the town and harbour, which seems to have been largely funded by the townspeople and was under the control of Plymouth's mayor and aldermen. Only a small section of the castle fabric survives, located in Lambhay Street, at the head of a flight of stairs leading down to the Mayflower Steps on the quayside.

=== The Barbican ===
Closely associated with the castle was a fortification right at the mouth of Sutton Harbour which gives its name to the present Barbican district. From depictions on Renaissance maps, it apparently consisted of a fortified jetty from which the harbour entrance could be "chained over when the need requireth".

== Tudor fortifications ==
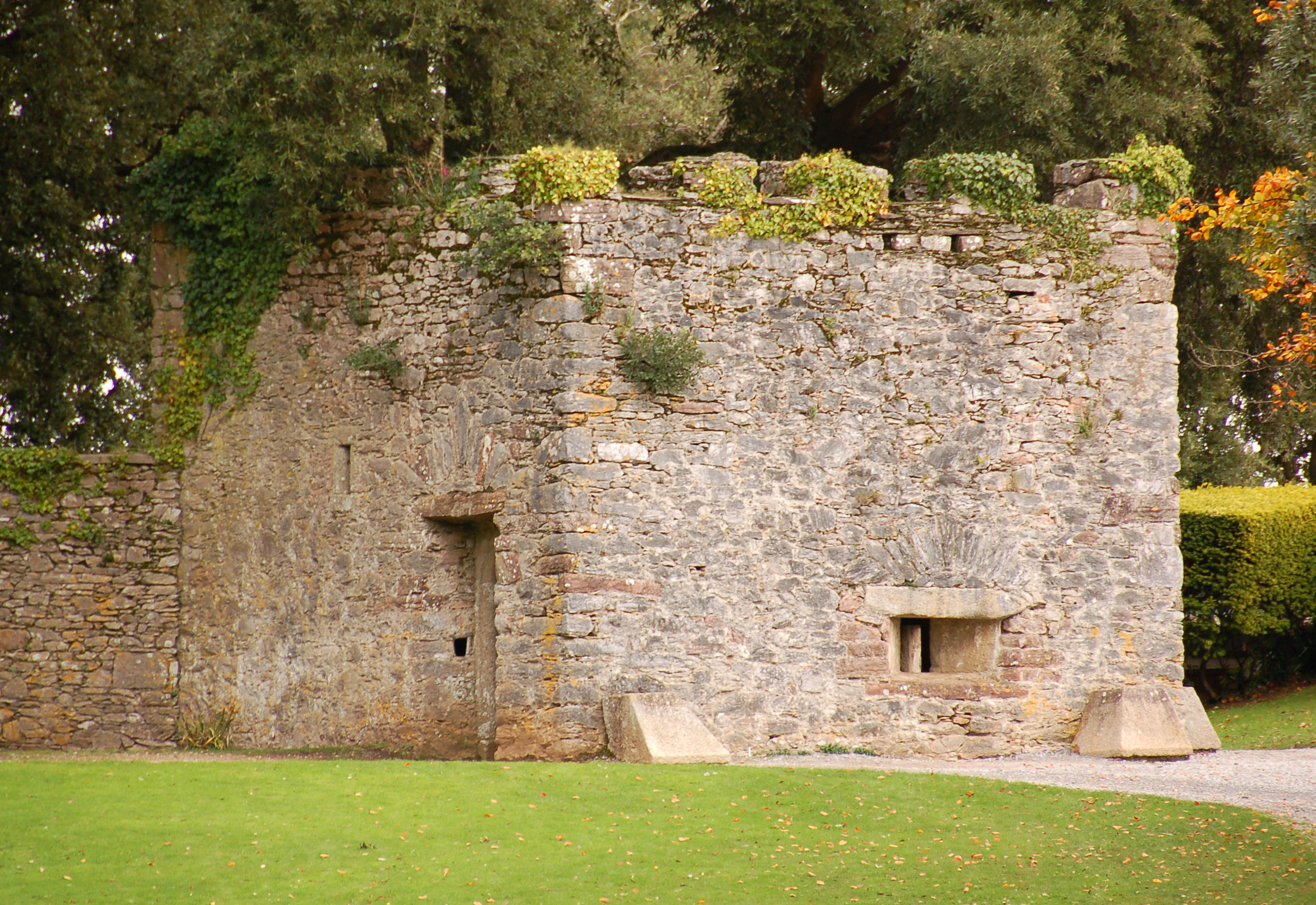
The blockhouse at Mount Edgcumbe, which is believed to date from circa 1545

=== Tudor blockhouses ===
During the early Tudor period, six blockhouses were constructed at various points around Plymouth Sound. These were small artillery towers intended to command the stretch of water immediately in front of them.

- Fisher's Nose Blockhouse is sited on the headland at the eastern end of Plymouth Hoe and dominates the Cattewater, which is the approach to Sutton Harbour. It may have been built in the late 15th century and is shown on a chart dated 1540. It is currently in use as a café.
- Mount Edgcumbe Blockhouse is at the entrance to the Hamoaze, the estuary of the Tamar, at the western end of Plymouth Sound. Believed to have been built by the Edgcumbe family to protect their estates. It can still be visited.
- Devil's Point Blockhouse is on the headland opposite Mount Edgecumbe and the exterior can be viewed.
- Firestone Bay Blockhouse at Stonehouse may also have been built by the Edgcumbes. It is now a restaurant.
- Millbay West and Millbay East protected the harbour at Millbay but are no longer extant.

=== Elizabethan works ===
In 1590, Sir Francis Drake was appointed to improve the defences of Plymouth. After setting up some temporary artillery batteries on the Hoe and on St Anthony's Island, (later known as Drake's Island), he requested the funds to build a permanent fort on the Hoe and in 1592, Queen Elizabeth I imposed a local tax on pilchards for the purpose. Construction of the fort, later called Drake's Fort, continued until 1596 after Drake's death. The northern landward side of the fort was protected by two bastions and it enclosed the previously established batteries on the Hoe and also the Fisher's Nose Blockhouse. A further blockhouse called Queen Elizabeth's Tower was built a short distance to the west of Fisher's Nose. In July 1602 an Italian military engineer called "Frederick Genebelli" or Federigo Giambelli was appointed to supervise works at Plymouth fort.

== 17th century fortifications ==
=== The Siege of Plymouth ===
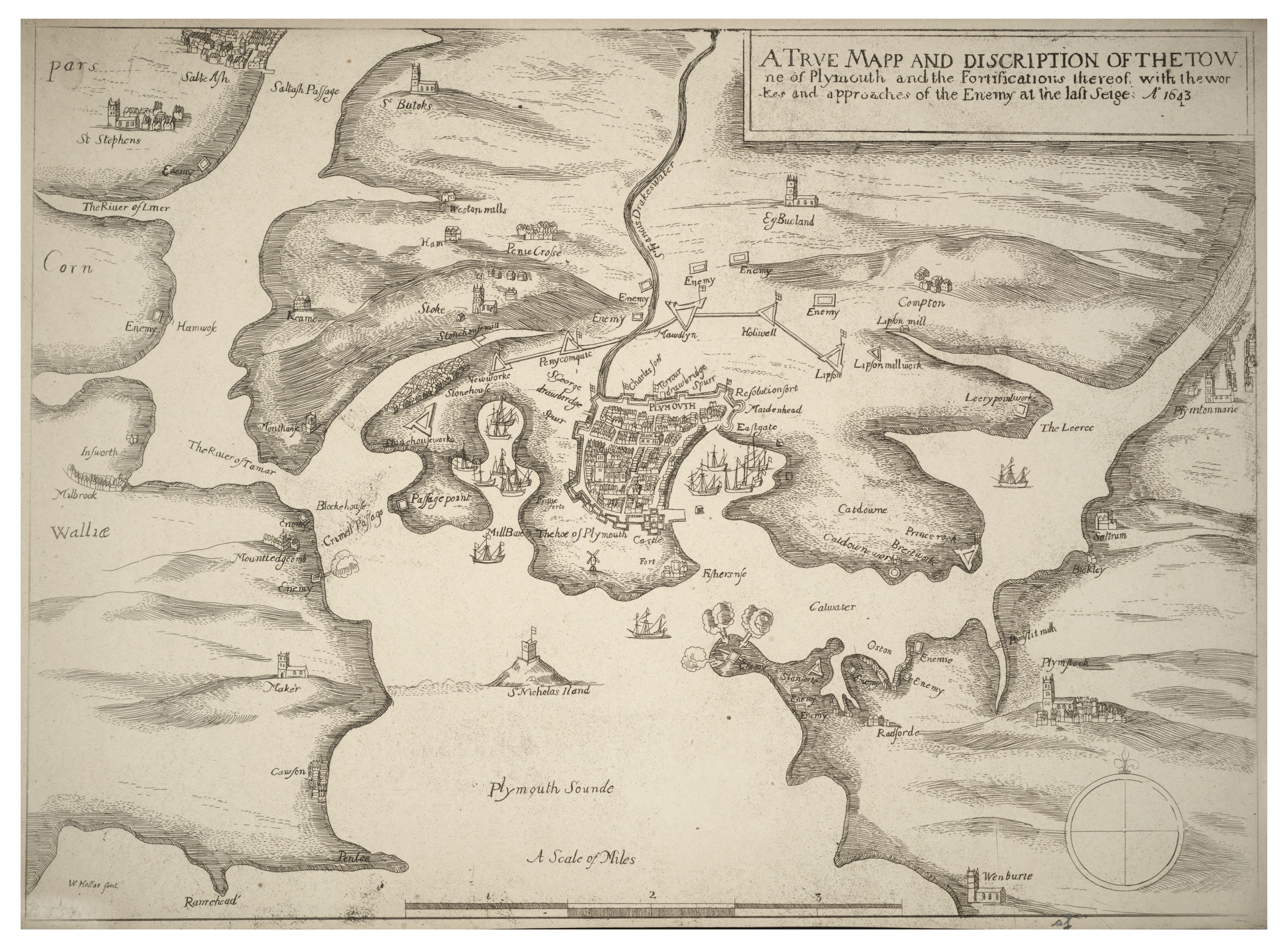
A map by Wenceslas Hollar showing the temporary fortifications of the Siege of Plymouth during the English Civil War.

During the English Civil War, Plymouth declared for Parliament while much of the rest of Devon and Cornwall was a stronghold of the Royalists. Accordingly, the town was besieged by Royalist forces between 1643 and 1646. The existing fortifications only protected Plymouth from the sea, and so a ditch and earthen rampart were hastily built around the town, with a further line of triangular redoubts on high ground to the north, stretching from Lipson in the east, across North Hill to Stonehouse in the west. The Royalists built their own line of redoubts facing them, but lacked the heavy guns needed for a breakthrough. The besiegers were able to build a battery on the headland later called Mount Batten, effectively preventing ships from entering Sutton Pool and forcing the Plymothians to use the harbour at Millbay instead.

=== Mount Batten Tower ===
Built in 1652, Mount Batten Tower is a 30-foot high circular artillery fort dominating the Cattewater from the south, opposite Fisher's Nose.

=== The Royal Citadel ===
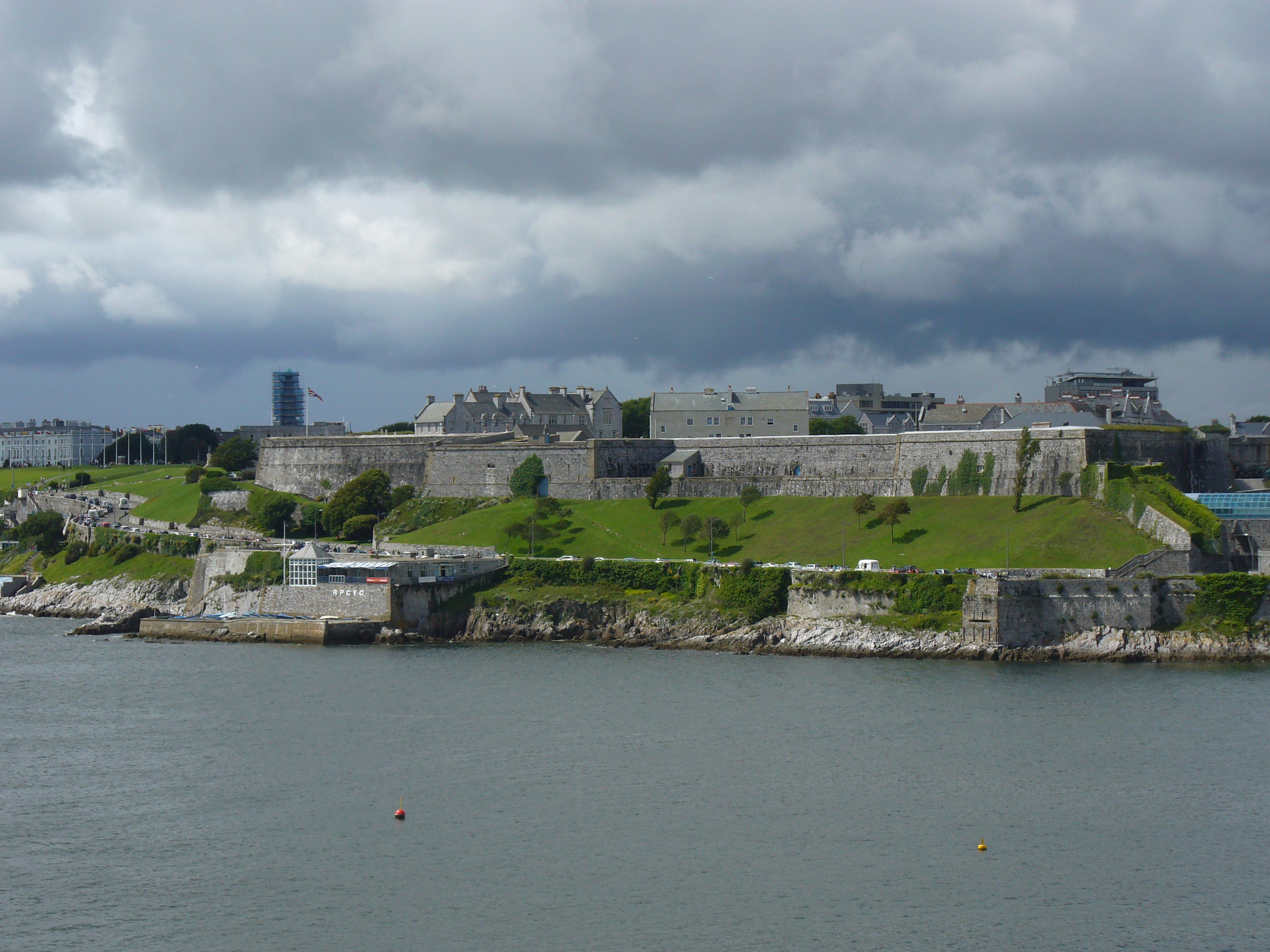
The Royal Citadel as seen from Mount Batten

The Royal Citadel was built from 1665 to the design of Sir Bernard de Gomme. It is a bastion fort at the eastern end of the Hoe, constructed over the site of Drake's Fort. It is still in military use, being the base of 29 Commando Regiment of the Royal Artillery, although guided tours are available during the summer.

=== Queen Anne's Battery ===
To the east of the entrance to Sutton Pool, an open artillery battery was completed in 1667; it was later named after Queen Anne who reigned from 1702 to 1714. The site of the battery is now a marina.

== 18th century fortifications ==
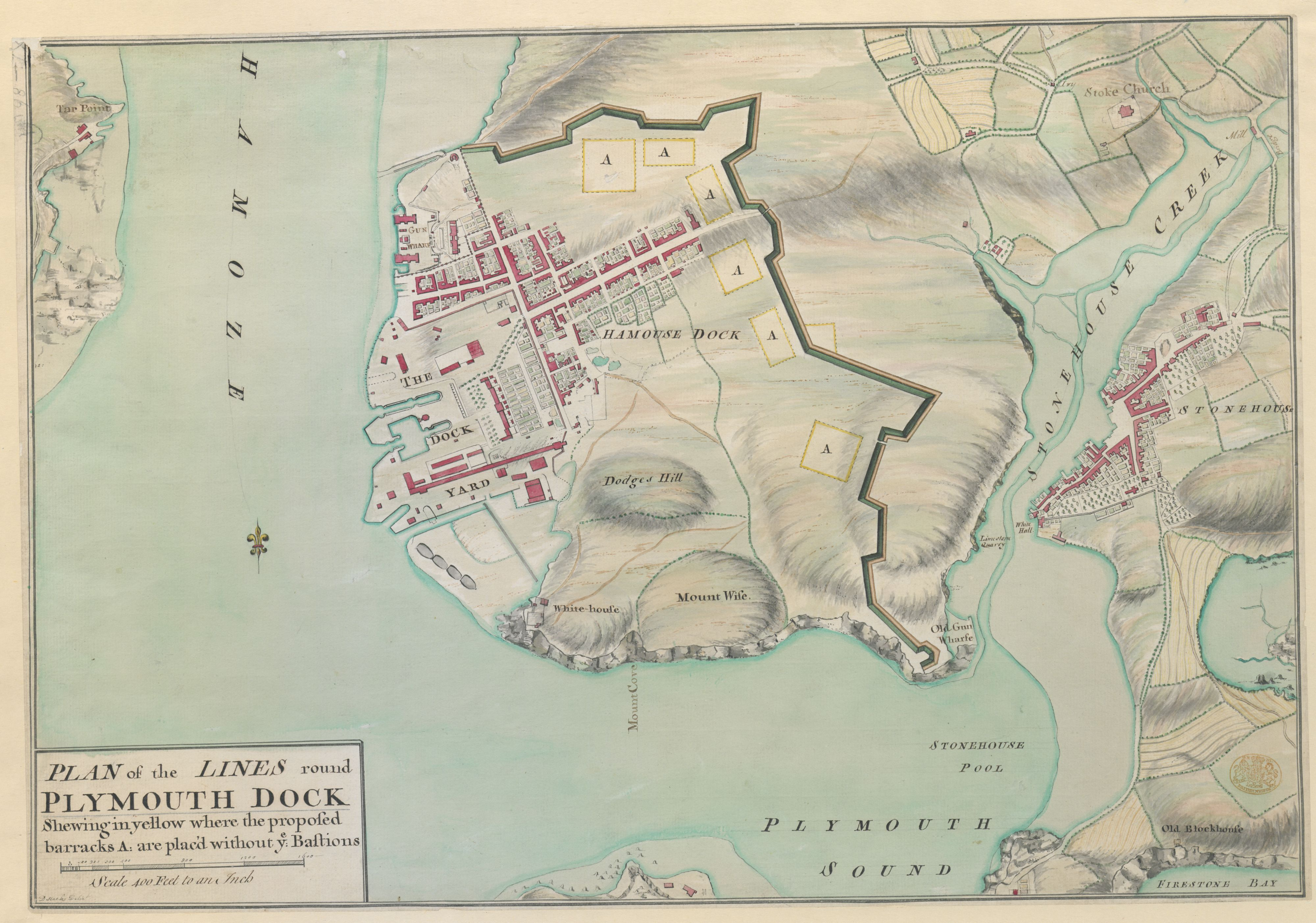
Plan of the Lines round Plymouth Dock, by Daniel Slack, 1756.

=== Western batteries ===
In 1690, work had started on a new Royal Dockyard on the Hamoaze, initially called Plymouth Dock but later renamed Devonport. In 1701, new earthen batteries were built to protect dockyard at Devil's Point (Stonehouse), Drake's Island and Cawsand Bay.

=== Devonport Lines ===
When the Seven Years' War brought conflict with France and Spain, it was decided to protect the dockyard from landward attack by means of a ditch and earthen rampart, known as the Dock Lines or later the Devonport Lines. The total length was about 2,000 yards (1,800 metres) and included four bastions and two gateways, a third gate was added at the end of the century to give access to the Torpoint Ferry. The lines were supported in the rear by a series of defensible barracks, each provided with a rampart and bastions. A survey in 1805 shows 130 guns mounted on the lines and they were completely rebuilt from 1810 to 1816 with a stone faced rampart and a deeper ditch. The lines were progressively abandoned and redeveloped in the second half of the 19th century.

=== Mount Pleasant Redoubt ===
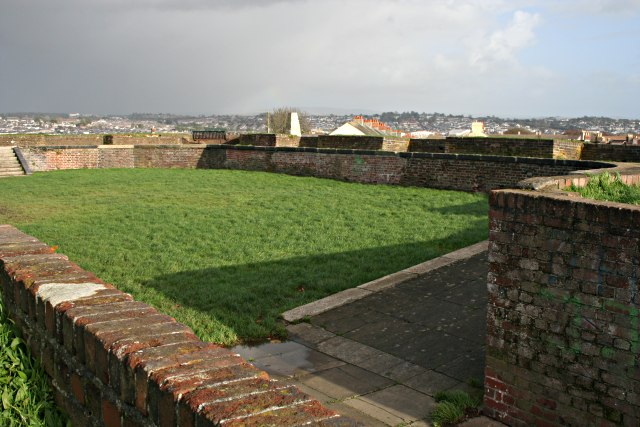
The Mount Pleasant Redoubt at Stoke, Plymouth.

About 1,000 yards (900 metres) forward of the Dock Lines, a rectangular redoubt was built at Stoke on top of Mount Pleasant. It was an earthwork with stone facings, defended by a ditch and drawbridge. The remains of the redoubt can be seen in Mount Pleasant Park.

=== Maker Redoubts ===
The American War of Independence again brought a threat from France and Spain who had entered the war as allies of the Thirteen Colonies. There was a perceived weakness in Plymouth's defences on the Cornish (western) side of Plymouth Sound, and although simple batteries had been built at Barnpool, Kingsand. Cawsand and a redoubt at Cremyll, it was thought that an attacking force could establish themselves on the ridge of high ground near the village of Maker which overlooked both the Sound and the dockyard. In August 1779, a fleet of French and Spanish ships anchored off Cawsand Bay but withdrew soon afterwards; regular and militia troops camped on Maker Heights for the following three summers and constructed a line of five earthen redoubts along the ridge under the direction of Lieutenant-Colonel Dixon. During the French Revolutionary Wars, redoubts Number 4 and 5 were rebuilt with stone revetments and a sixth stone redoubt was built at Empacombe in 1807.

== The Palmerston Forts ==
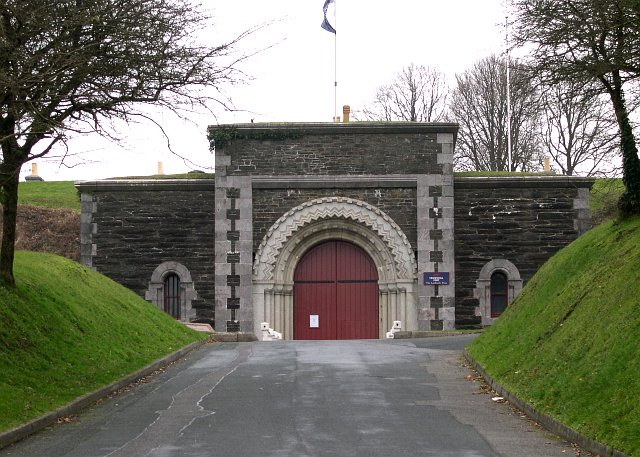
The entrance to Crownhill Fort; one of the fortifications recommended by the 1859 Royal Commission.

The Palmerston Forts were built as part of an arms race with France under Napoleon III and a perceived threat of invasion. Although work on some of the forts around Plymouth started in the late 1850s, most were based on the recommendations of the Royal Commission on the Defence of the United Kingdom, which was established by Lord Palmerston in 1859 and reported in the following year. The forts which were actually constructed provided two lines of coastal artillery forts to defend the seaward approaches to Plymouth and the dockyard at Devonport, while a further semi-circle of forts defended the overland approaches. Note that some works are defined as "forts" and some as "batteries" without any clear distinction between the two appellations.

=== Sea Defences, Outer Line ===
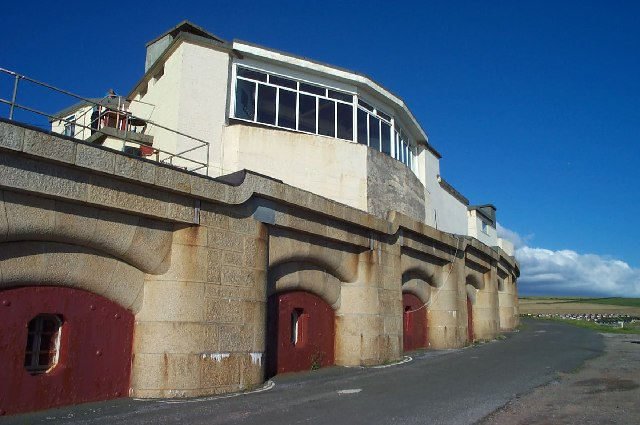
Fort Bovisand's granite casemates, originally built for 9-inch Rifled Muzzle Loading guns.

- Fort Bovisand

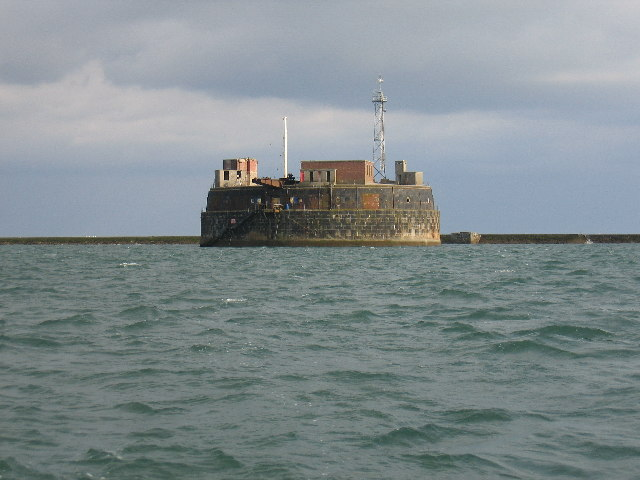
Plymouth Breakwater Fort from inside the Sound

- Breakwater Fort
- Picklecombe Fort
- Cawsand Fort

=== Sea Defences, Inner Line ===
- Drake's Island Battery
- Garden Battery, Mount Edgcumbe
- Eastern Kings Battery and Western Kings Battery

=== Western Defences ===
- Fort Tregantle
- Fort Scraesdon
- Polhawn Battery

=== North Eastern Defences ===
- Ernesettle Fort
- Agaton Fort
- Knowles Battery
- Woodlands Fort
- Crownhill Fort
- Bowden Fort
- Egg Buckland Keep
- Forder Battery
- Fort Austin
- Fort Efford
- Laira Battery

=== Staddon Position ===
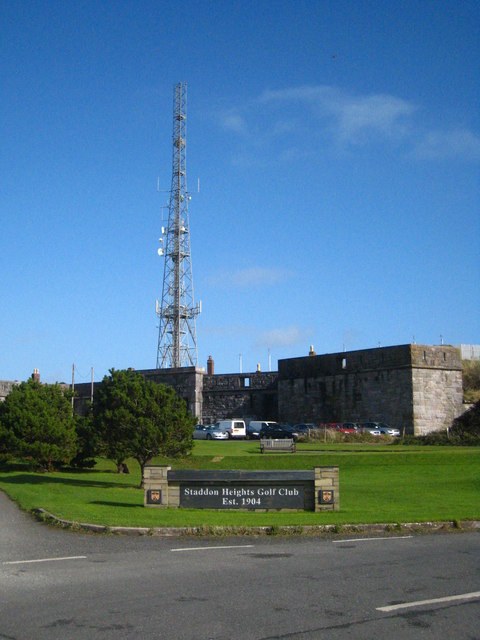
Staddon Fort is now a communications centre for the Royal Navy.

- Brownhill Battery
- Staddon Fort
- Stamford Fort
- Watch House Battery

=== Later works ===
Following the 1859 Royal Commission, the defences of Britain's dockyards were reviewed at intervals during the late 19th and early 20th centuries. As a result of improved weapons and changes in tactical doctrine, a number of new fortified batteries were constructed, while older ones were either modernised or disarmed.

- Frobisher Battery (1888)
- Hawkins Battery (1888)
- Tregantle Down Battery (1888–1894)
- Penlee Battery (1889)
- Rame Church Battery (1889–1893)
- Raleigh Battery (1890)
- Whitsand Bay Battery (1889)
- Lord Howard's Battery (1909)
