= List of Palmerston Forts around Plymouth =

Several of the forts surrounding Plymouth were built as a result of a decision in Lord Palmerston's premiership to deter the French from attacking naval bases in the south of the country. The Royal Commission on the Defence of the United Kingdom reported in 1860 and resulted in a huge building programme. Examples of the forts are:

- Agaton Fort
- Fort Austin
- Fort Bovisand
- Bowden Fort
- Brownhill Battery
- Cawsand Fort
- Crownhill Fort
- Drake's Island Battery
- Egg Buckland Keep
- Ernesettle Fort
- Fort Efford
- Forder Battery
- Hawkins Battery
- Knowles Battery
- Laira Battery
- Mount Edgcumbe Garden Battery
- Penlee Battery
- Picklecombe Fort
- Weston Mill Fort
- Plymouth Breakwater Fort
- Polhawn Battery
- Raleigh Battery
- Fort Scraesdon
- Staddon Fort
- Stamford Fort
- Fort Tregantle
- Watch House Battery
- Whitesand Bay Battery
- Woodlands Fort
