= Tregantle Down Battery =

Former gun battery in south east Cornwall

- Tregantle; Cornwall; England

Site information
- Condition: Infilled

Location
- Coordinates: 50.3559°N 4.2644°W

Site history
- Built: 1888–1894

Tregantle Down Battery was a high angle gun battery in south east Cornwall. It was built between 1888 and 1894 to defend HMNB Devonport from Whitsand Bay area and was infilled to form a car park in the early 1970s.

== History ==
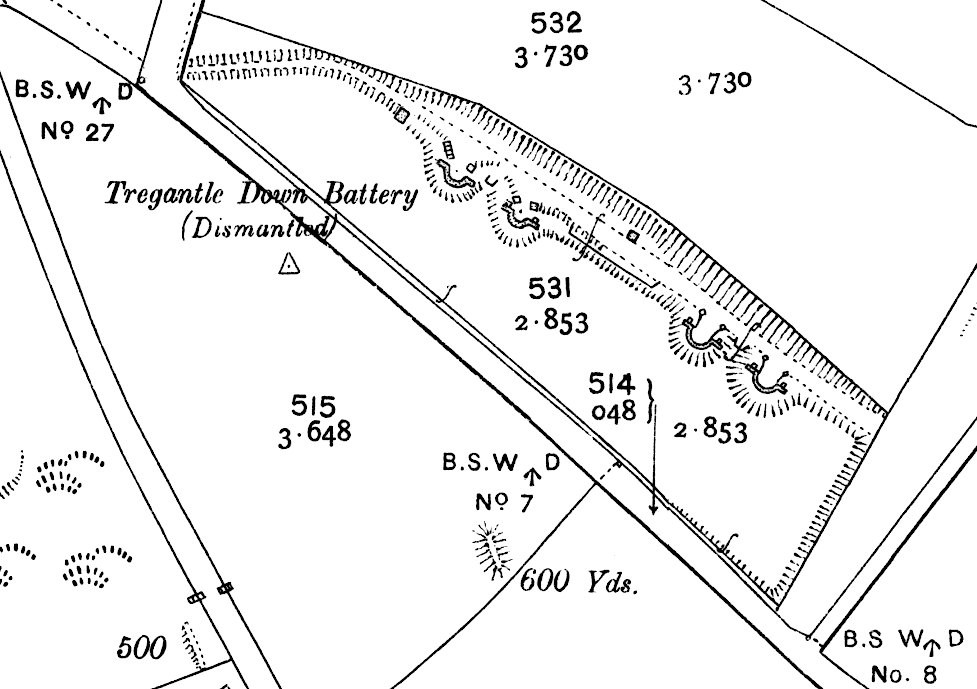
A dismantled Tregantle Down Battery depicted on an Ordnance Survey map from 1905.

Tregantle Down Battery was designed with four RML 9-inch 12-ton guns that were adapted to fire at a high angle. This allowed shells to be dropped down to inflict maximum damage on the vulnerable upper decks of an enemy vessel rather than their heavily armoured sides. Together with the new Rame Church, Penlee and Hawkins Batteries, Tregantle Down covered Whitsand Bay and was intended to prevent an enemy from bombarding Plymouth Dockyard from the bay. The construction of the battery was carried out by Messrs Debnam and Son of Plymouth between 18 August 1888 and 30 June 1894 at a cost of £4,231.

The four gun emplacements were built in pairs, with the magazine in-between. The magazine contained a weighing room (later converted into a shell store), a casemate with a rack for rifles, a Royal Artillery store, two cartridge stores and a shell store. An oil and paint store was also built at one end of the battery. The battery was manned by the troops accommodated in the nearby Tregantle Fort. Two position finding cells to direct the battery's guns were built below in Crowstone field, above Tregantle Down Cliff, in 1893.

The battery's four guns were installed, two at a time, during 1893. Both pairs of guns were landed at Wacker Quay in Antony before being transported to the battery using the Wacker to Tregantle military railway, which was built to supply Tregantle and Scraesdon Forts, as well as the batteries in the area. The first pair of guns were taken to the battery by April 1893 and the second pair were transported there in October 1893.

The battery was decommissioned in about 1905 and its guns were removed shortly after. The site was recorded as being overgrown but in good condition in 1970. It was infilled in the early 1970s to form a car park. Much of the battery, including its emplacements and magazine, may survive below ground. Some surface markings and outlines of the battery's features remain on the site.
