= Rame Church Battery =

Former gun battery in south east Cornwall

- Rame; Cornwall; England

Site information
- Condition: Demolished/infilled

Location
- Coordinates: 50.3221°N 4.2079°W

Site history
- Built: 1889–93

Rame Church Battery was a gun battery in south east Cornwall. It was built between 1889 and 1893 to defend HMNB Devonport from Rame area and was demolished and infilled in the early 1970s.

== History ==
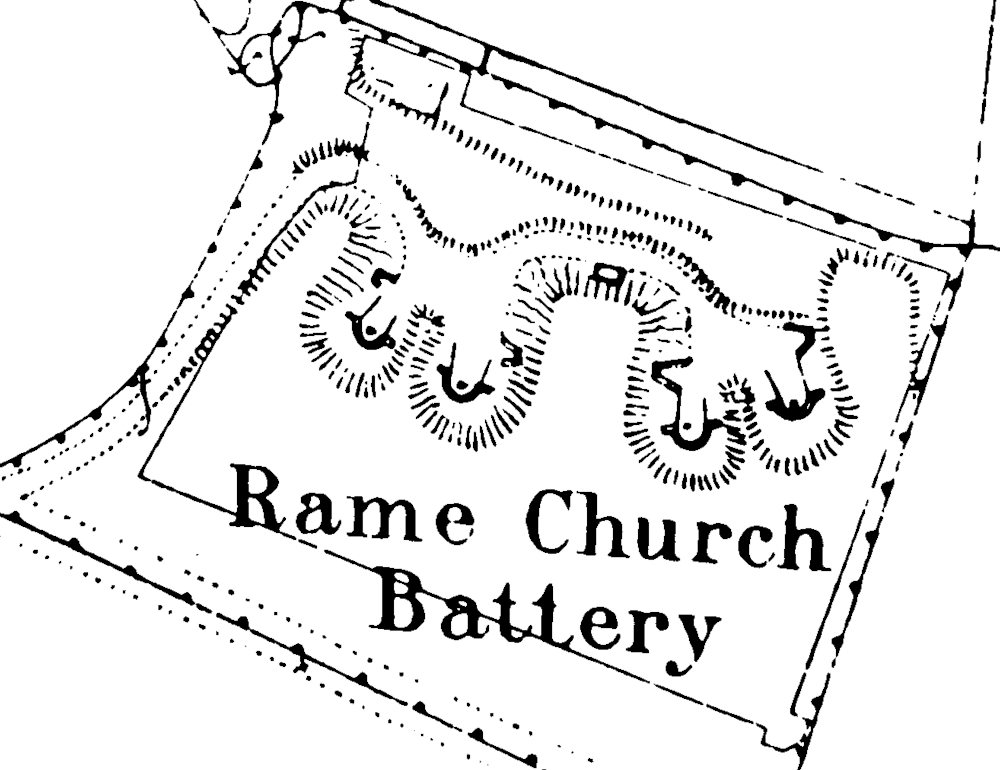
The original Rame Church Battery depicted on an Ordnance Survey map from 1895.

The construction of Rame Church Battery was carried out by Messrs Reed, Blight and Co. of Plymouth between 1 June 1889 and 30 March 1893 for a cost of £5,060. Together with the new Tregantle Down, Penlee and Hawkins Batteries, Rame Church covered the western approaches to Plymouth Sound and was intended to prevent an enemy from bombarding Plymouth Dockyard from the region of Whitsand Bay.

Rame Church Battery was designed for four RML 9-inch 12-ton guns that were adapted to fire at a high angle. This allowed shells to be dropped down to inflict maximum damage on the vulnerable upper decks of an enemy vessel rather than their heavily armoured sides. Messrs Turpin and Son of Plymouth brought the guns and their carriages to the battery in 1893 and they were then mounted by a detachment of the 7th Company Western Division, Royal Artillery from Picklecombe Fort.

The battery's four gun emplacements were built in pairs, with the magazine in-between. The magazine contained a shell store, cartridge store and lamp room. Between both pairs of emplacements was a cartridge recess. The battery had two small shelters, one at each end of the battery, and an oil and paint store on one side of the battery. Behind the magazine and emplacements was a Royal Artillery store and a telephone room. A caretaker's quarters was built in the north-east corner of the site in 1897-98 for £603.

In 1908, proposals were made for the removal of the RML guns and their replacement with two BL 9.2-inch Mk VI guns on high angle mountings. The plans were approved in 1911 and work then began on remodelling and rebuilding the battery. Two new gun emplacements were built and the original magazine was adapted to contain the lamp room and two cartridge stores, and a new section built to form a shell store. An engine room was also built by one of the emplacements to power the two guns.

The battery served as an active fortification throughout World War I and most of the 1920s. The guns were recommended for removal in 1927 and the battery was disarmed in 1929. In 1972, Cornwall County Council embarked on a scheme to demolish and infill the battery. The site is now rough grassland.
