= Raleigh Battery =

Former coastal artillery battery in England

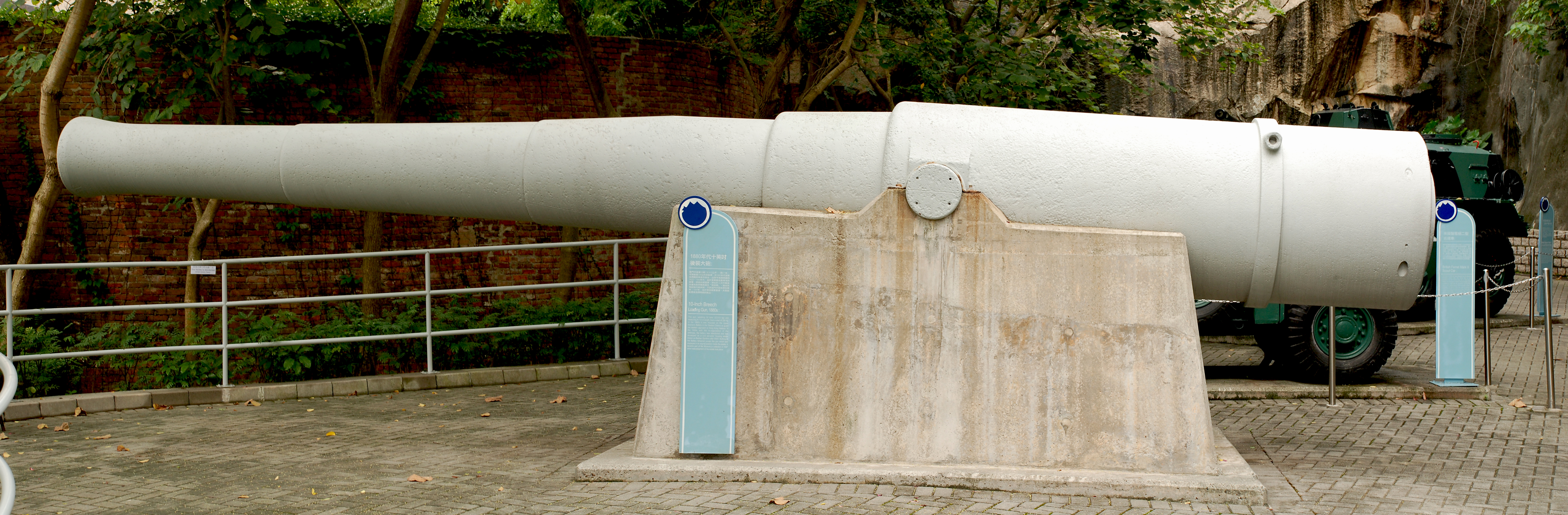
- The battery was built for two 10-inch Breech Loading (BL) guns in 1890

Site information
- Open to the public: Accessible
- Condition: Derelict, complete

Location
- Location within Devon
- Coordinates: 50.3426°N 4.1893°W

Site history
- Built: 1890–1894
- In use: Disused
- Materials: Earth; Concrete

Raleigh Battery is a former coastal artillery battery, built to defend the Royal Naval Dockyard at Devonport.

The battery was constructed between March 1890 and August 1894 at a cost of £4,963. It was located between Hawkins Battery and due-east of Maker Farm, on sloping land facing the sea. The battery was positioned to prevent ships lying at anchor off Cawsand Bay and to support Picklecombe Fort guarding the approaches to Plymouth Sound. It mounted two 10-inch Breech Loading (BL) guns, one on an Elswick Ordnance Company barbette mounting, the other on a Royal Carriage Department barbette mounting.

The gun positions were served by underground magazines which were linked by a tunnel that slopes down underneath a central earth traverse. There was one magazine to the north of the tunnel and two cartridge stores (each with its own serving hatch) to the south. Each gun emplacement had a store, cartridge recess, a shell recess and a shelter for the gun crew, all built into the concrete gun apron. To the right of the right-hand gun emplacement was a water catchment area and tank. The caretaker's office was on the opposite side which consisted of two bedrooms, a living room and a scullery. In between both of these were two Depression range finders enabling the guns to accurately fire at their targets. Behind the left hand emplacement was an oil store. The battery was surrounded by an iron pallisade fence. There was no barrack accommodation at the battery.

The battery was one of very few to mount 10-inch guns, as by the 1890s British Coast Artillery armament was standardised on the 9.2-inch Breech Loading (BL) gun. The nearby Penlee Battery could provide the required defence, and as a result the guns were dismounted in 1910. The battery was abandoned by the War Office in 1948.

The battery remains complete but overgrown.

== Bibliography ==
- Hogg, Ian V (1974). Coast Defences of England and Wales 1856-1956. David & Charles. ISBN 0-7153 6353-0.
- Woodward, Freddy (1996). The Historic Defences of Plymouth. Cornwall County Council. ISBN 978-1898166467.
