= Fort Efford =

- Plymouth; Devon; England

Site information
- Controlled by: Plymouth City Council
- Open to the public: No
- Condition: Overgrown, partly derelict

Location
- Coordinates: 50.389167°N 4.11°W

Site history
- Built: 1863-1868
- Materials: Earth; Masonry

Fort Efford is a former 19th-century Fort, built as a result of the Royal Commission on National Defence of 1859. It was built to defend the landward approaches to the North East of Plymouth. This was part of an overall scheme for the defence of the Royal Naval Dockyard at Devonport, Plymouth. They were known as Palmerston Forts after the Prime Minister who championed the scheme.

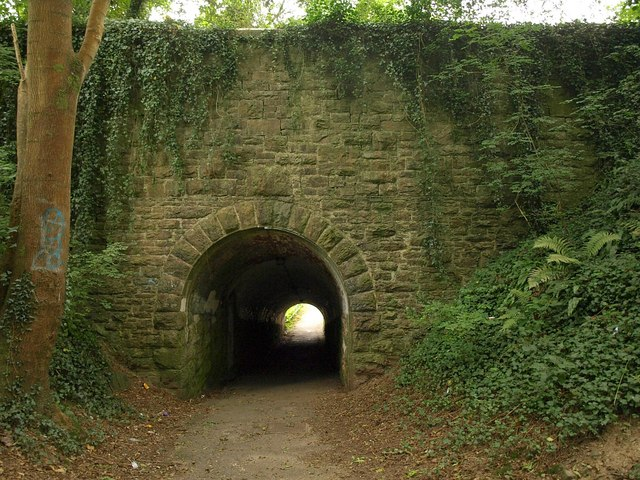
Efford Emplacement in 2009.

Designed by Captain (later Maj General) Edmund Frederick Du Cane, it was built by George Baker and Company and finished by the Royal Engineers. It was armed with 21 guns, some of which flanked the nearby Laira Battery. To house part of the Forts' Garrison a barrack block to house five officers and 108 men was built within the rear section of the Fort. In the 1890s a moveable armament shed was built on the parade ground to house two 5-inch Breech Loading guns.

By the early 1900s the Fort had become obsolete as a defensive position and was disarmed. During the Second World War it was used for ammunition storage. It was sold by the War Office in 1961. It was Grade II listed in 2003. It has been used for storage by the Showman's Guild for many years.

== Bibliography ==
- Hogg, Ian V (1974). Coast Defences of England and Wales 1856-1956. David & Charles. ISBN 0-7153 6353-0.
- Woodward, Freddy (1996). The Historic Defences of Plymouth. Cornwall County Council. ISBN 978-1898166467.

== External sources ==
- Palmerston Forts Society
