= Knowles Battery =

Artillery battery in City of Plymouth, Devon, England

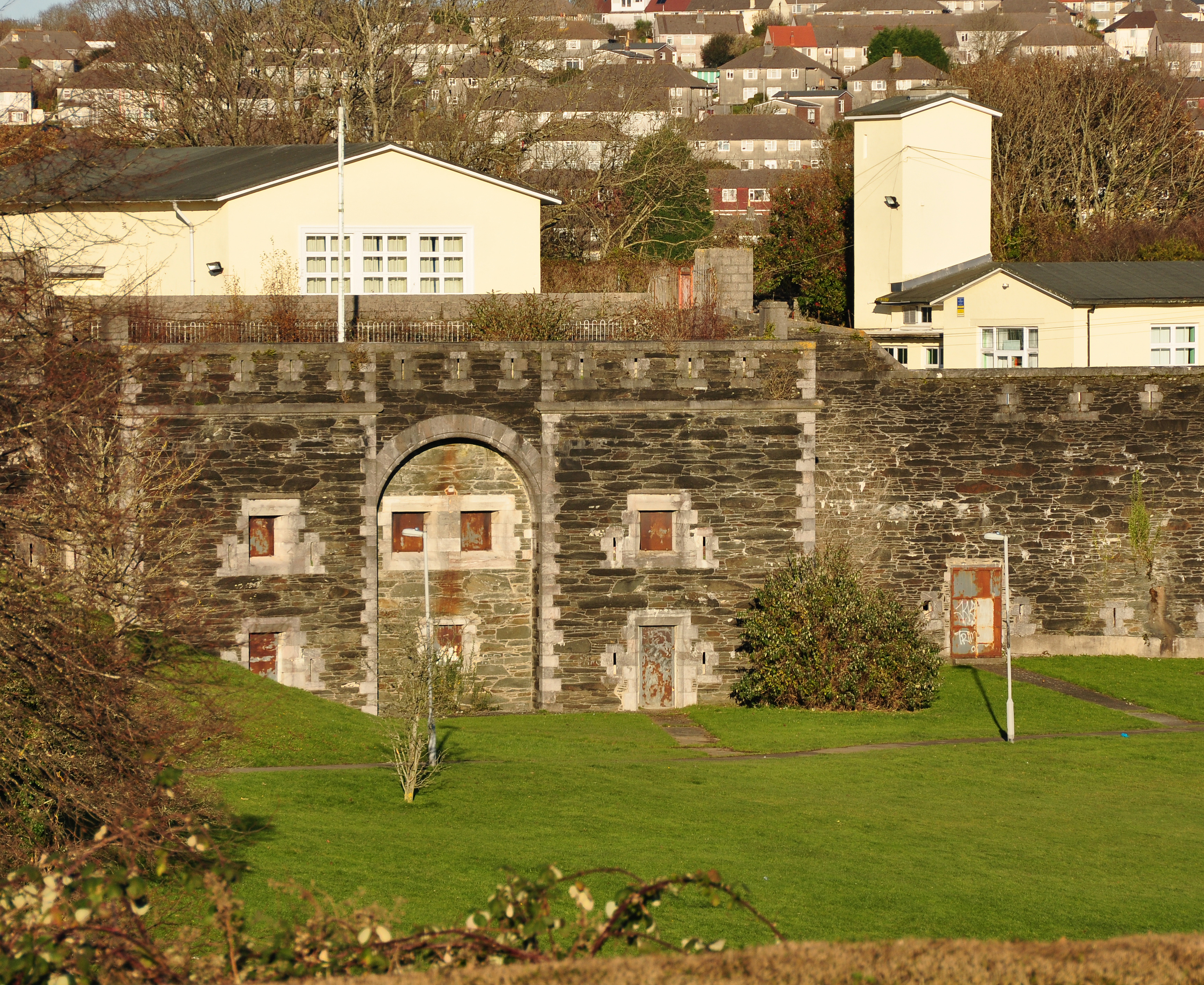
- Rear gorge wall and gateway to Knowles Battery

Site information
- Open to the public: No
- Condition: Partially demolished

Location
- Coordinates: 50°24′59″N 4°09′52″W

Site history
- Built: 1863-1870
- In use: Now part of a school
- Materials: Earth; Masonry

Knowles Battery is a former 19th-century fort, built as a result of the Royal Commission on National Defence of 1859. Part of an extensive scheme known as Palmerston Forts, after the prime minister who championed the scheme, it was built to defend the landward approaches to the north east of Plymouth, as an element of the plan for the defence of the Royal Naval Dockyard at Devonport.

Designed by Captain (later Maj General) Edmund Frederick Du Cane, it was built by George Baker and Company and finished by the Royal Engineers. It was designed to be armed with thirteen guns. Fire from the battery linked with nearby Woodlands Fort and Agaton Fort

By the early 1900s the fort had become obsolete as a defensive position and was disarmed. It was sold by the War Department in 1930. A school was built on the site in the 1960s. Knowles Battery was listed as a scheduled monument in 1973. It is now part of Knowle Primary School.

== Bibliography ==
- Hogg, Ian V (1974). Coast Defences of England and Wales 1856-1956. David & Charles. ISBN 0-7153 6353-0.
- Woodward, Freddy (1996). The Historic Defences of Plymouth. Cornwall County Council. ISBN 978-1898166467.
