= Fort Bovisand =

Coastal fort in Devon, England

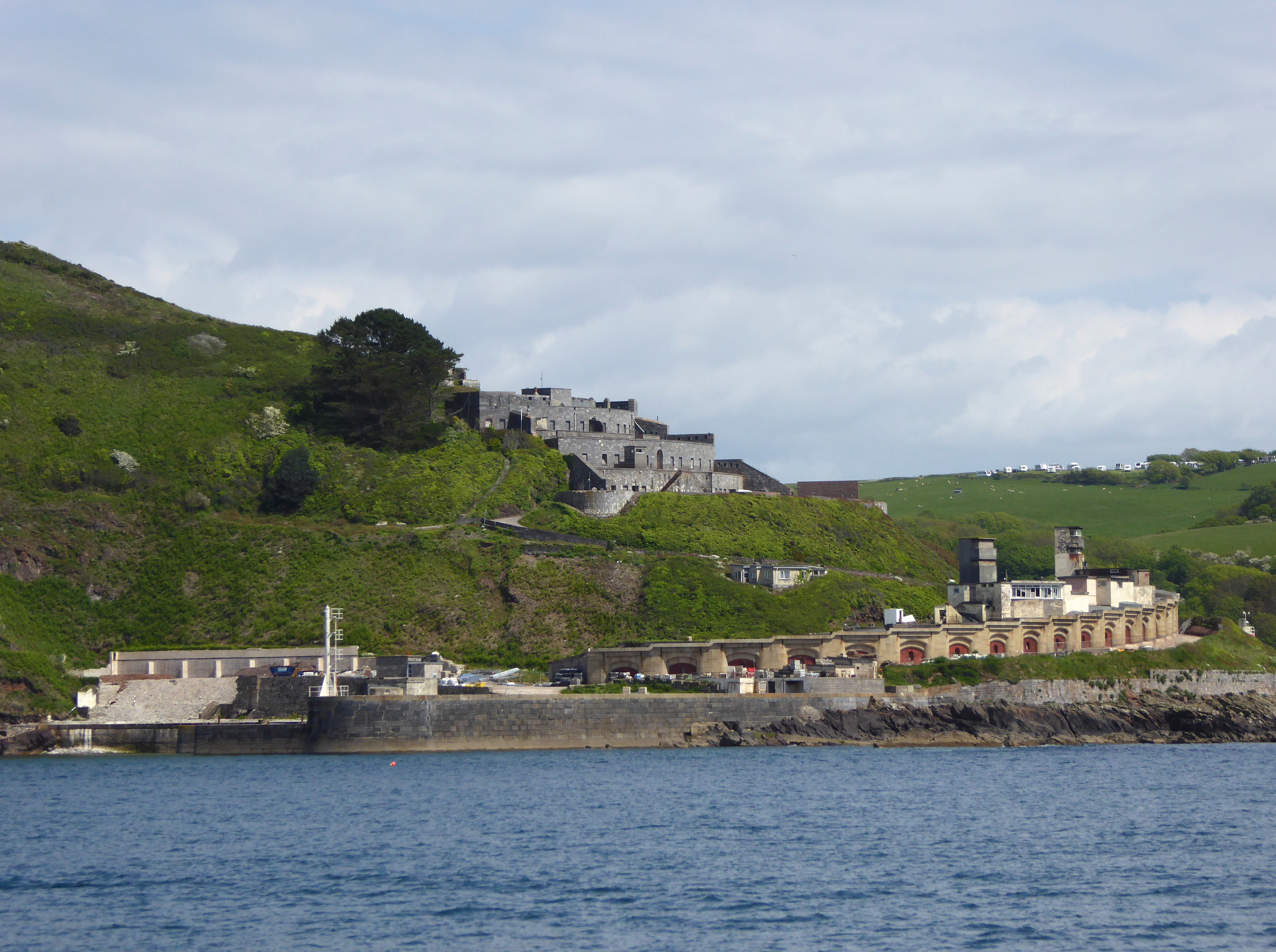
- Fort Bovisand from Plymouth Sound

Site information
- Open to the public: No
- Condition: Complete

Location
- Coordinates: 50°20′12″N 4°07′38″W

Site history
- Built: 1861-1869
- Materials: Concrete; Masonry

Fort Bovisand is a fort in Devon, England near the beach of Bovisand. It was built as a result of the Royal Commission on the Defence of the United Kingdom which reported in 1860. It is located on the mainland to defend the entrance of Plymouth Sound, at the narrows opposite the east end of Plymouth Breakwater. The fort is beside Bovisand harbour.

== History ==
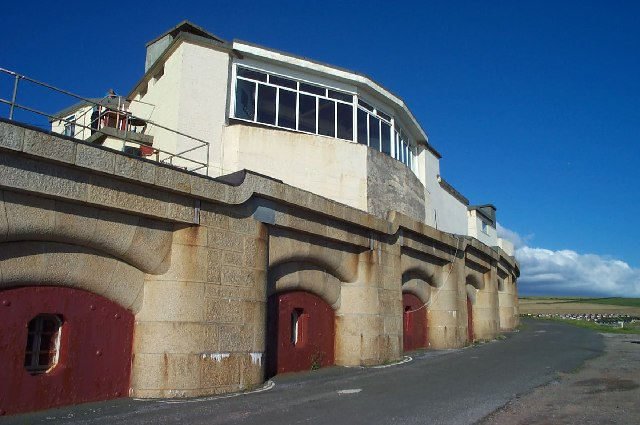
Fort Bovisand's granite casemates, originally built for 9-inch Rifled Muzzle Loading guns.

In 1816, a stone jetty and slip were built for boats from sailing warships anchored in Plymouth Sound to collect fresh water from the nearby reservoir.

In 1845, the first fort at the site, named Staddon Height Battery, was started. It still exists in the upper part of the present fort.

Work started on the main part of the fort in 1861. Originally intended to have two stories of casemates like Fort Picklecombe, the design was altered during construction to a single storey of 23 granite casemates with armoured shields. It was designed by Major (later Maj Gen) Whitworth Porter , and was built by George Baker and Company. The casemates were arranged in an arc and initially housed 22 9-inch Rifled Muzzle Loaders (RMLs) and one 10-inch RML gun, with accommodation for 180 men. Underground there are large deep tunnels to store artillery ammunition safe from enemy gunfire. It was completed in 1869.

By 1880, the armament included 14 10-inch and nine 9-inch RML guns. By 1893 it mounted 14 10 inch Rifled Muzzle Loading Guns, eight 9-inch Rifled Muzzle Loading (RML) guns and six 6 Pounder Quick Firing (QF) guns. In 1898 Six 12-pounder quick-firing guns were installed. By the early 1900s the original armament was obsolete and was removed.

In 1942, the remaining four 12-pounders were replaced by two twin 6-pounders, to combat E-boats. A three-storey observation tower to direct the fire of these was built at the same time. The following year a Bofors 40 mm anti-aircraft gun was installed.

On the dissolution of coast artillery in 1956, the Ministry of Defence abandoned the fort. In 1970, a lease was granted and the fort was converted into a national commercial diving school and scuba diving centre.

About the mid-1970s to at least the early 1990s, the fort at the top of the headland (above the coastal path) was used as a schools outdoor activity centre. The upper fort's magazine and various other buildings were converted to be used as basic bunk houses, kitchen and dining area. The cottage was used as a toilet and shower block and a lounge and staff accommodation.

By 2000, the main leaseholder — Fort Bovisand Underwater Centre — had liquidated, but other diving services continued trading. Months of argument continued about the status of the leases and viability of existing businesses based there.

In December 2000, Plymouth Ocean Projects Ltd. went into receivership. As a result, the owners (the Ministry of Defence) decided it was no longer possible to keep the site functioning, and the remaining diving and other firms trading there ceased operations.

In mid 2004, after these businesses failed, the site was bought from the Public Receiver by Powder Creek Ltd (now known as Fort Bovisand Developments Ltd), and company majority owned by Greg Dyke, ex-Director General of the BBC, with the aim of saving the site and bringing it back to life.

By late 2004, Fort Bovisand was home to Discovery Divers.

In 2011, after examining a number of options, the Fort Bovisand Trust was formed (a registered charitable body) to take forward proposals for a heritage attraction and a bid to the Heritage Lottery Fund. Proposals were for a mixed scheme of the heritage centre, diving business, and some residential units.

In 2013, the Fort Bovisand Trust gained award of a development grant from the Heritage Lottery Fund to progress plans for a heritage visitor attraction and learning centre.

The visitor attraction proposal was unfortunately unsuccessful in receiving a full delivery grant from the Heritage Lottery Fund - being beaten to first place by the Concorde Museum at Filton, Bristol. However, both Historic England and South Hams District Council remained keen to see the site saved and brought back into use, and, working with the developers, subsequently granted approval for additional residential units along with catering and commercial units.

Preparation works and additional surveying operations were conducted in 2019, with works to stabilise the cliffs and the access road, in order to secure access to the fort and also to the adjacent private residences, carried out during 2020.

Work to deliver the first stage of the new development commenced in early 2021 and should be completed in late 2023.

== Bibliography ==
- Hogg, Ian V (1974). Coast Defences of England and Wales 1856-1956. David & Charles. ISBN 0-7153 6353-0.
- McDonald, Kendall (1997). Fort Bovisand: Divers complete guide. Wreckwalker books. ISBN 0-9528637-1-5.
- Woodward, Freddy (1996). The Historic Defences of Plymouth. Cornwall County Council. ISBN 978-1898166467.
