= Staddon Fort =

Coordinates: 50.346°N 4.114°W

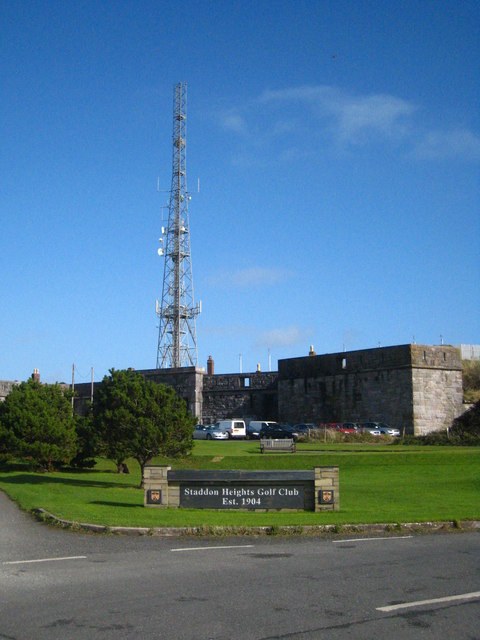
- Rear of Staddon Fort, showing later communications mast

Site information
- Type: Fort
- Owner: Ministry of Defence
- Open to the public: No
- Condition: Complete

Site history
- Built: 1861-1869
- Materials: Earth; Masonry

Staddon Fort is a 19th-century fort, built as a result of the Royal Commission on National Defence of 1859. Part of an extensive scheme known as Palmerston Forts, after the prime minister who championed the scheme, it was built to defend the landward approaches to the east of Plymouth, as an element of the plan for the defence of the Royal Naval Dockyard at Devonport.

Designed by Captain (later Maj General) Edmund Frederick Du Cane, it was built by George Roach and Company. The fort was connected by a military road to the nearby Stamford Fort, Watch House Battery and Brownhill Battery. It was designed to be armed with 34 guns and 6 mortars. To house the fort's garrison a barrack block for 250 men was built within the rear section of the fort.

By the early 1900s the fort had become obsolete as a defensive position and was disarmed. It remains in use by the Royal Navy as a communications centre. Along with a number of other parts of the Staddon Heights defences, it became a scheduled monument in 1969.

== Bibliography ==
- Hogg, Ian V (1974). Coast Defences of England and Wales 1856-1956. David & Charles. ISBN 0-7153 6353-0.
- Pye, Andrew; Woodward, Freddy (1996). The Historic Defences of Plymouth. Cornwall County Council. ISBN 978-1898166467.
