= Scraesdon Fort =

Coordinates: 50.371876°N 4.262662°W

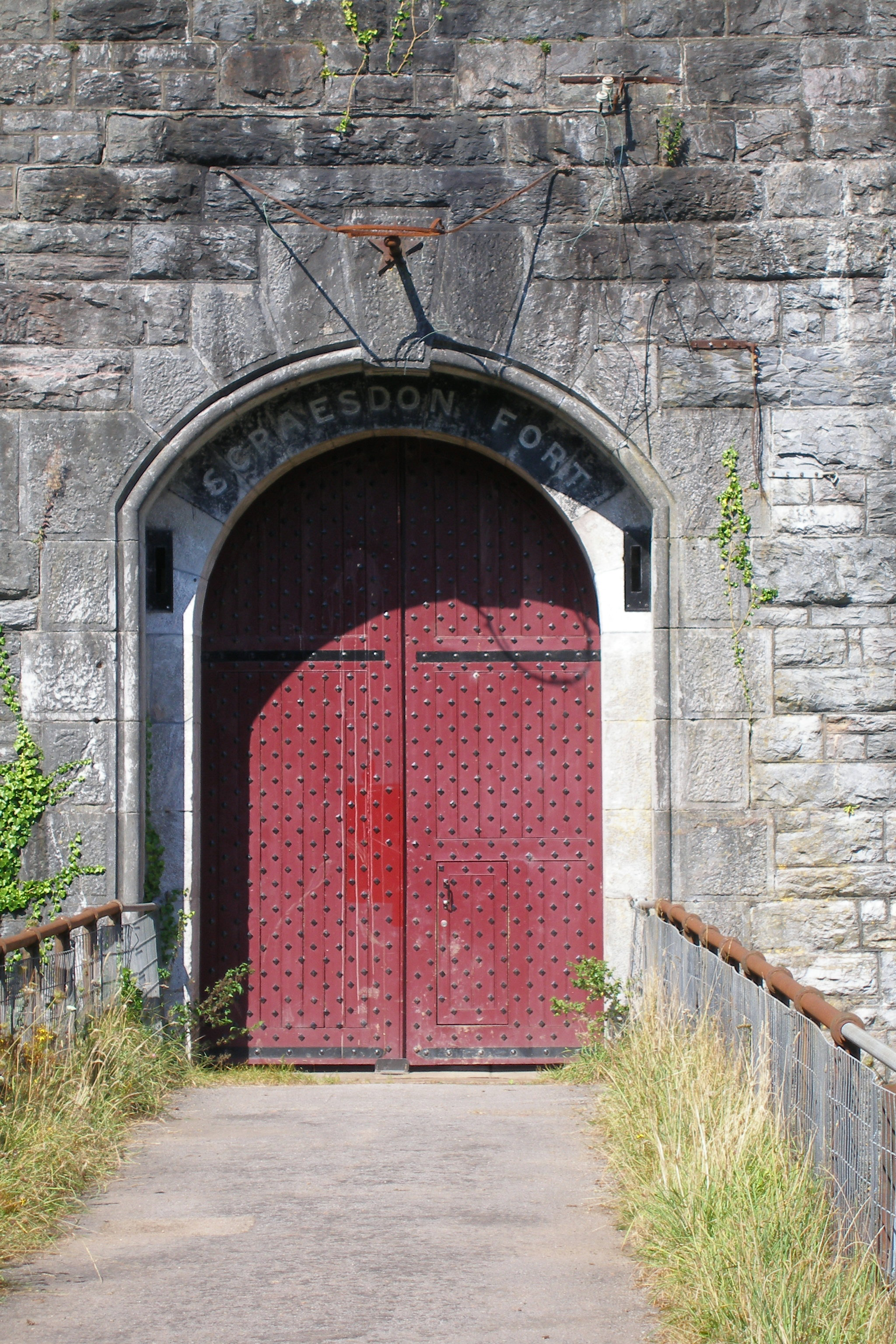
- Main entrance gate to the Fort

Site information
- Open to the public: No
- Condition: Complete, but overgrown and derelict

Location

Site history
- Built: 1859-1868
- In use: Training area
- Materials: Earth; Masonry

Scheduled monument
- Official name: Scraesdon Fort
- Designated: 19 January 1968
- Reference no.: 1140707

Listed Building – Grade II
- Official name: Scraesdon Fort
- Designated: 26 January 1987
- Reference no.: 1004347

Scraesdon Fort, near the village of Antony, is one of several forts in South East Cornwall which formed part of the ring of forts surrounding Plymouth to protect Plymouth Sound and, in particular, the naval dockyard of Devonport from enemy naval attack. They were built as a result of a decision in Lord Palmerston's premiership to deter the French from attacking naval bases in the south of England.

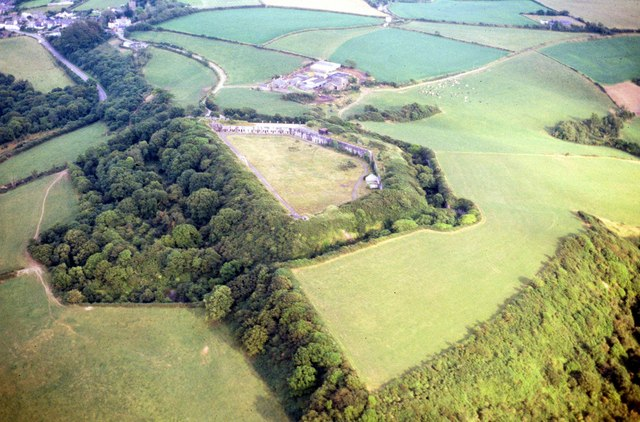
Aerial view

Scraesdon Fort was designed in 1859 by Captain (later Maj General) William Crossman, and was built by F Roach and Company, Plymouth.

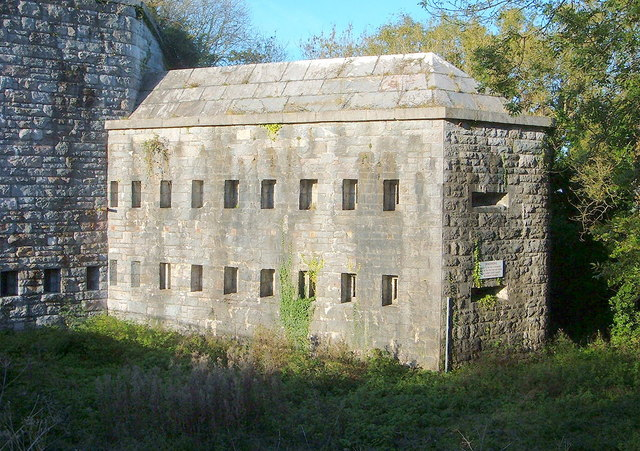
Defensive caponier in the ditch around the fort

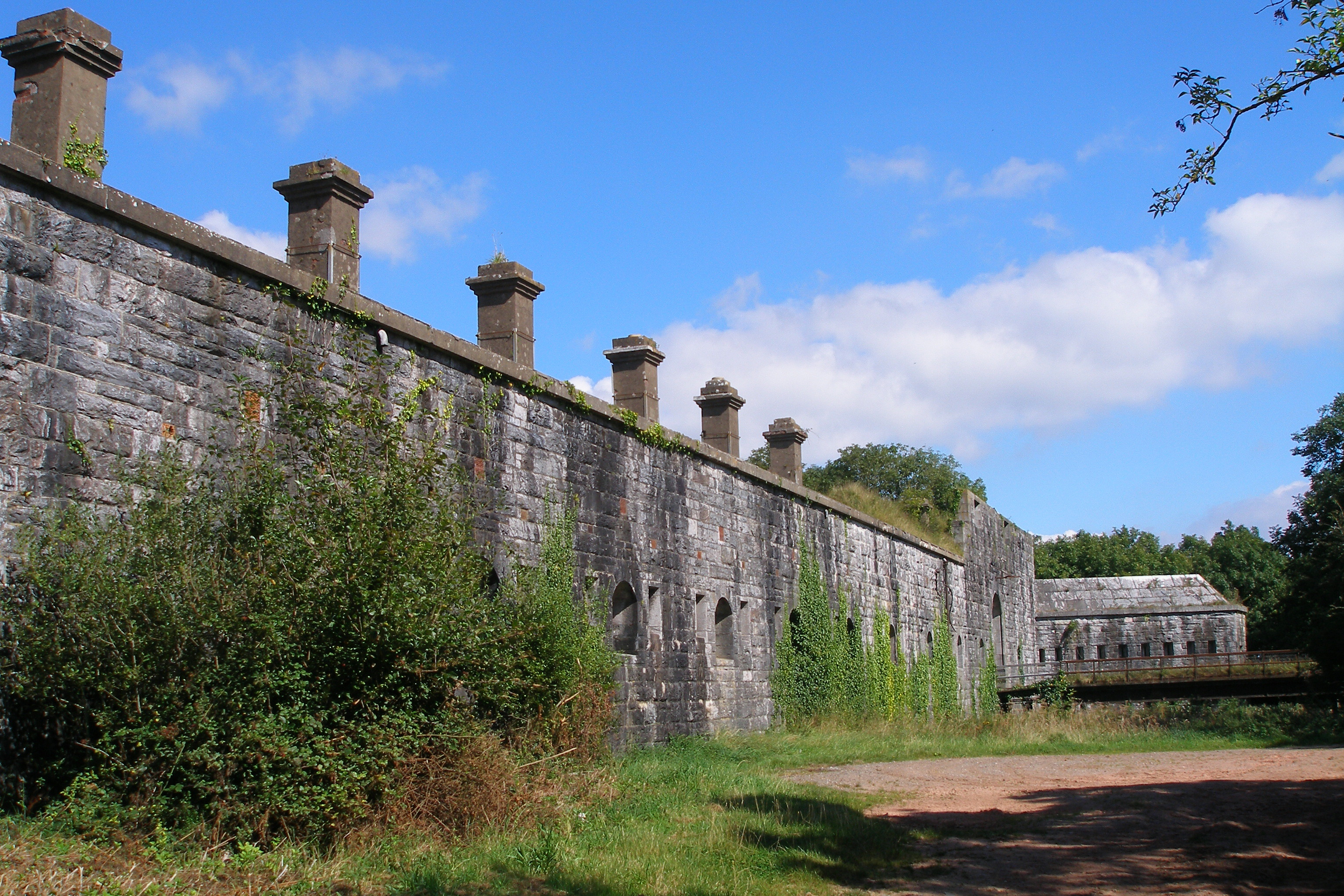
East wall and barrack chimneys

It was completed at a cost of £137,000. It is constructed in the Land Front, polygonal, near octagonal format. It has a dry ditch, and was designed to have twenty-seven 7-inch breech-loading guns on the ramparts. By 1893 it mounted one 64 Pounder Rifled Muzzle Loading Guns, eight 7-inch Rifled Breech Loading (RBL) gun, two 32 Pounder Smooth Bore Breech Loading (SBBL) guns and two 5-inch Breech Loading guns.

The upper level is 254 ft above mean sea level (AMSL) and the lower level is 173 feet AMSL.

The fort was used by the MOD as a training barracks, but it is currently empty, derelict and overgrown. It was used to train Royal Navy Artificer Apprentices from HMS Fisgard and HMS Raleigh; it is occasionally used now by Royal Marine Commandos recruits as part of their final exercise, as well as being used by local Army Reserve units. The most renowned history of the fort, is that of the Scraesdonians. These are two brothers who know the fort better than any map, or man. Legend has it, they have never been seen, nor caught whilst in the fort grounds. Their names will be etched in the history of the walls of Scraesdon for eternity. The fort is also used for airsoft events on an ad hoc basis. It was Grade II listed in 1968.

A military railway, used from 1893 to 1903, connected the fort with the River Lynher at Wacker Quay, near St. Germans. It also provided a link to the main fort on the Rame peninsula at Fort Tregantle. The railway ran underneath the metal bridge and down a gradient, then went underneath the current A374 road, and alongside Wacker Quay. The locomotive shed was extant on the quayside until the late 2000s, when it was removed by Cornwall CC, who had been using it as a highways depot. and other remnants of the railway can also be seen. There was also an extensive marshalling area next to the east wall of the fort.

== Bibliography ==
- Hogg, Ian V (1974). Coast Defences of England and Wales 1856-1956. David & Charles. ISBN 0-7153 6353-0.
- Woodward, Freddy (1996). The Historic Defences of Plymouth. Cornwall County Council. ISBN 978-1898166467.
