= Crownhill Fort =

Royal Commission Fort built in the 1860s in England

Coordinates: 50°24′49″N 4°07′48″W

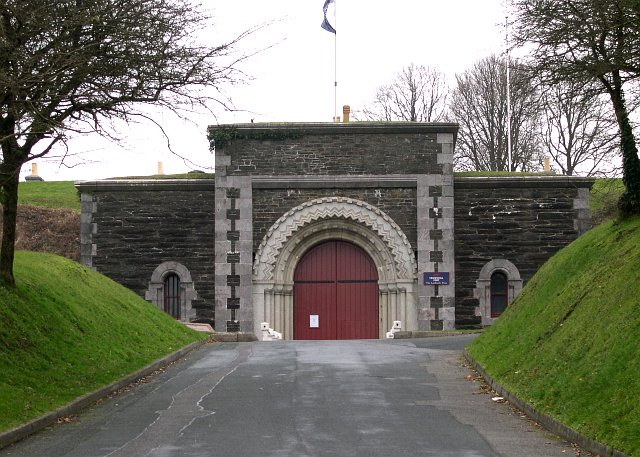
The entrance to the fort

Crownhill Fort is a Royal Commission Fort built in the 1860s in Crownhill as part of Lord Palmerston's ring of land defences for Plymouth. Restored by the Landmark Trust, it is now home to several small businesses, museums, exhibitions and a holiday apartment sleeping up to eight people. The Fort is open to the public on the last Friday of each month and hosts tours for local schools and societies at other times.

== History of the fort ==
Crownhill Fort was designed by Captain Edmund Frederick Du Cane as one of Lord Palmerston's last forts and was the largest of the forts of Plymouth's North Eastern defences, whose purpose was to defend the Royal Dockyard at Devonport from the possibility of a French attack, under the leadership of Napoleon III.

Construction began in April 1863, with Crownhill Fort being at the cutting edge of fortress design, although it does conform to the standard polygonal design of its contemporaries. It was built 400 metres in front of the defensive line, now incorporated into the east-west Crownhill Road, in an exposed position on a natural outcrop. Crownhill Fort is designed for all round defence, with each of its seven sides having massive ramparts and being surrounded by a deep ditch. All sides were also protected by gunfire, with the fort having around 350 built-in rifle loopholes. It was designed for an armament of 32 guns on the ramparts and 6 mortars sited in two mortar pits to the south west and north west of the Parade Ground. A year later, in 1864, Russian commander General Todleben was shown the building works, and he complimented them.

In 1866, after a strike, George Baker, the building contractor, went bankrupt and so the work was finished by the Royal Engineers who would become Crownhill Fort's first occupants. The total cost of the construction was £76,409; a large sum at the time, but much less costly than other Palmerston forts.

In 1881, the Director of Artillery and Stores recommended that two forts, Fort Widley in Portsmouth and Crownhill Fort, be armed with complete peacetime armaments. None of the original armament survives but The Landmark Trust has reinstated several artillery pieces similar to those that would have occupied Forts of this kind.

Due to continual advancement in weaponry and warfare many Victorian forts were abandoned by the army. Crownhill Fort remained an MOD site until 1986 and was instead used by many different infantry regiments as HQ Plymouth Garrison.

In the First World War, Crownhill Fort was used as a recruitment and transport centre for troops being sent to the fronts in Turkey and Africa. It was then used as a de-mobilisation depot before becoming a base for the newly created Royal Signals Corps.

The last time Crownhill Fort was armed was during the Second World War, when anti-aircraft guns were positioned in the fort. Following the war, in the 1950s, it had a Gun Operations Room built on the parade ground, incorporating part of the Officers barrack. It then continued as a home for the 59 Independent Commando Squadron Royal Engineers until 1983, despatching 647 troops and 1,897 tonnes of war material during the Falklands War. The fort was purchased 3 years later by the Landmark Trust who have restored Crownhill Fort as the best preserved example of Palmerston's forts. In completing this task, Landmark Trust have received much assistance from grant aid courtesy of the European Committee, English Heritage and the Heritage Lottery Fund.

== Structure of Crownhill Fort ==
The basic shape of Crownhill Fort is a heptagon, incorporating many advanced Victorian fort design ideas.

=== The ditch ===
The fort is surrounded by a dry ditch hewn from the bedrock and flanked by caponiers. 200 000 tonnes of material had to be moved to create the ditch, which is 30 ft deep and 30 ft wide .

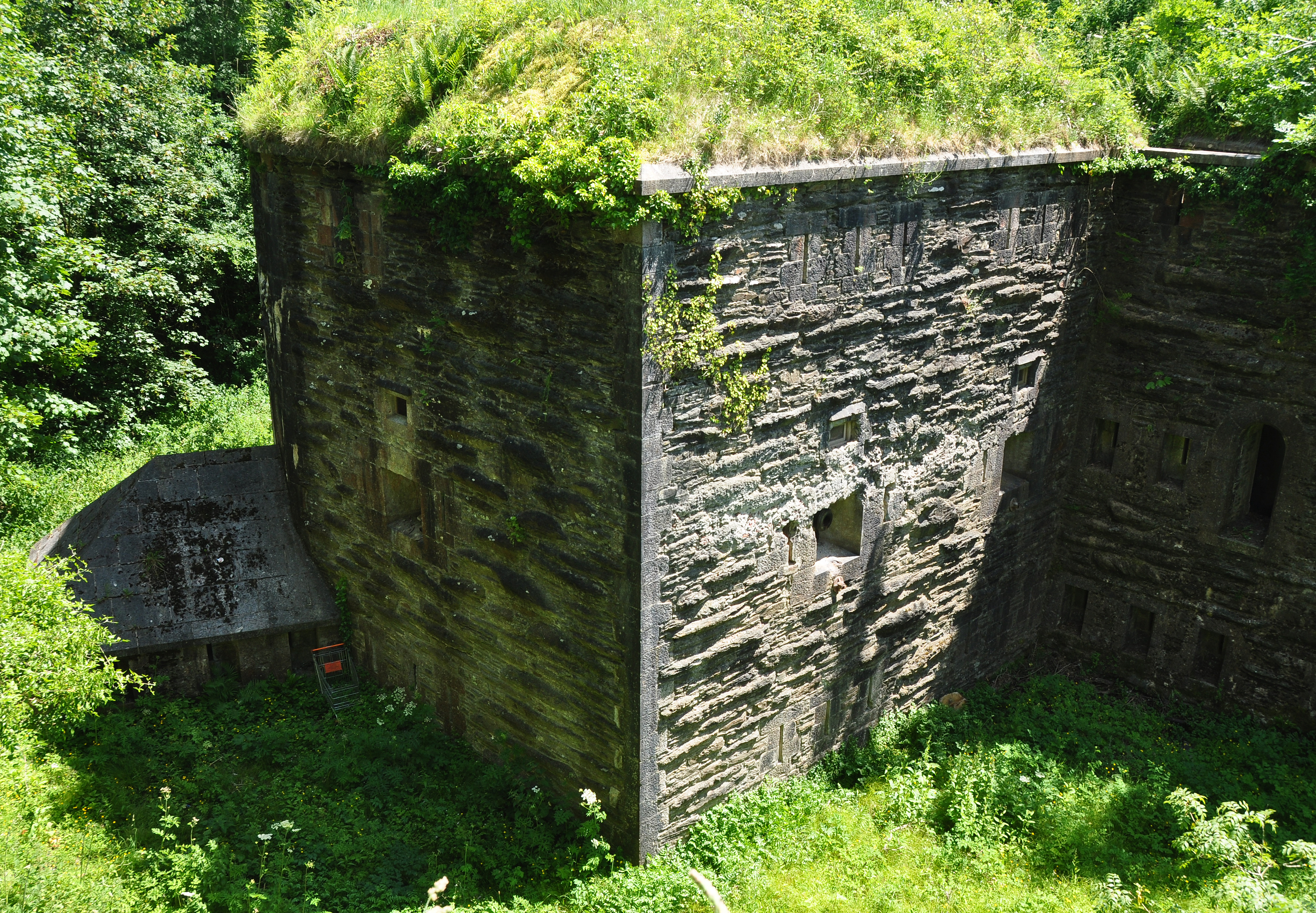
The north caponier showing the embrasures for heavy guns and the loopholes for small arms on the upper and lower levels.

=== The caponiers ===
Crownhill Fort has six three-storey caponiers. The first floor was for infantrymen, the second was for gun casements each housing Smooth-Bore Breech-Loading guns and the third connects with the Chemin de Ronde, the parapeted walkway circling the fort. The north caponier is a full caponier because it points in two directions. The other five caponiers are demi-caponiers because they face in one direction only.

== Crownhill Fort's guns ==
Crownhill Fort is famous for its collection of artillery. The cannon are maintained in working order and are fired on event days to recreate the sounds and atmosphere of a working fortress. In total, the fort has emplacements for 17 guns on its ramparts (including 5 Haxo casements and 2 Moncrieff pits) and 15 in its caponiers. Some of the guns that can be found at Crownhill Fort include:

- a replica Moncrieff Counterweight Disappearing Gun, one of only two working examples – the carriage uses a unique counterweight system to rise above the parapet to fire and then descend in a controlled manner, powered by the recoil.
- two 13-inch Mortars, on loan from the Royal Armouries, which were designed to fire 200-pound explosive shells. It is believed that they were used in the Crimean War, against Russia
- two 32 Pounder smooth-bore breech-loading guns from the 1880s, designed to fire case shot
- four replica 32-pounder smooth-bore breech-loading guns dating from 1997
- two replica Armstrong 7-inch rifled breechloaders. These guns were first issued to the Navy in 1858, but were found to be not powerful enough, and so were sent instead to be mounted on the ramparts of land fortifications, such as Crownhill Fort.
- two muzzle-loading 32-pounder guns, which were rescued from Tregantle Fort in Cornwall, where they were being used as bollards.
- a muzzle loading 2-pound cannon, from the 1790s
- a carronade made by the foundry Bailey, Pegg and Co Ltd, from Staffordshire that points towards the countermining gallery.

== The Fort today ==
Today Crownhill Fort is home to several small businesses and a holiday apartment. The Fort is open to the public on the last Friday of each month from January to November and by appointment for schools and groups at most other times. Visitors can see museum displays, watch demonstrations of Victorian firepower and take guided tours in the labyrinth of underground rooms and passages.

In the past few years The Landmark Trust has been able to carry out various improvement works at the Fort.

- In 2010 a large number of mature trees were felled on the rampart and extracted by helicopter. Left unchecked these trees would have damaged the structures under the rampart.
- 2014 saw the end of a three-year project to clear self-seeded saplings on the counterscarp walls. This project has seen logging horses employed to allow the timber to be extracted and processed.
- Work to clear the Victorian Storm Drains to help alleviate flooding on the lower decks of the structure was completed in 2017.
- In 2018 work was undertaken outside the Fort to restore several concrete fence posts added in the 1920s and replace their wiring.
- Work on the Royal Artillery Store is due to begin in September 2018 to bring this derelict building back in to use as a workshop.
