= Frobisher Battery =

- Plymouth; Devon; England

Site information
- Condition: Infilled

Location
- Coordinates: 50.3388°N 4.1217°W

Site history
- Built: 1888–1892

Frobisher Battery is a former gun battery at Staddon Heights, Plymouth, Devon. The original battery at the site, Twelve Acre Brake Battery, was completed in 1867 with positions for three guns. In 1888–1892, a new battery was built on the site, and renamed Frobisher Battery in 1890. It was armed with one RML 12.5-inch 38-ton gun, which was intended to be used to bombard enemy ships attempting to enter Plymouth Sound.

The battery was disarmed in 1903, and later infilled with earth during the late 20th century. The site is now overgrown, but much of the battery survives as a buried feature and is protected as a scheduled monument.

== Bibliography ==
- Woodward, Freddy (1996). The Historic Defences of Plymouth. Cornwall County Council. ISBN 978-1898166467.

== External sources ==
- Victorian Forts data sheet on Frobisher Battery
