= Lord Howard's Battery =

Former gun battery in Plymouth, Devon

- Plymouth; Devon; England
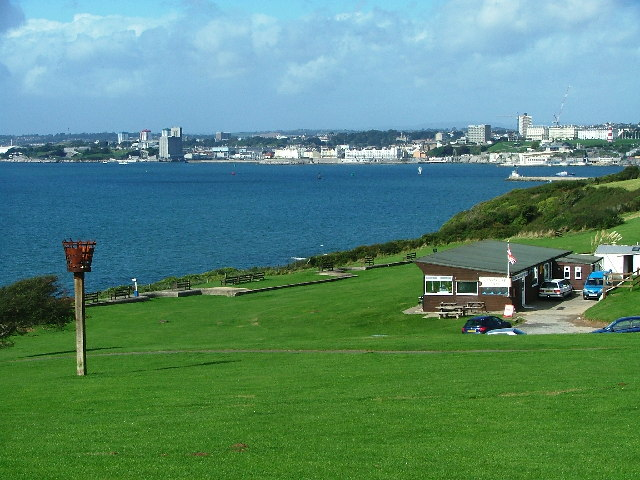
- The remains of Lord Howard's Battery, overlooked by Jennycliff Cafe

Site information
- Open to the public: Yes
- Condition: Infilled

Location
- Coordinates: 50.3520°N 4.1222°W

Site history
- Built: 1908–09

Lord Howard's Battery is a former gun battery built in 1908–09 to defend the approach to HMNB Devonport through Plymouth Sound and Jennycliff Bay.

The battery was armed with two BL 6-inch Mk VII guns, which were removed prior to World War II. The battery was recommissioned in 1941 with the installation of two guns of the same type, and these remained in place until the battery's closure in 1946.

After its closure, the battery was used as a caravan site. During the late 20th-century, the battery and its surrounding area was transformed into a public space by Plymouth City Council. The two gun emplacements and magazine were infilled with earth, and all ancillary buildings were demolished. The features that remain visible include the concrete aprons of the emplacements and a concrete parapet. Adjacent to Jennycliff Cafe is the battery's former blockhouse.

== Bibliography ==
- Woodward, Freddy (1996). The Historic Defences of Plymouth. Cornwall County Council. ISBN 978-1898166467.

== External sources ==
- Victorian Forts data sheet on Lord Howard's Battery
