= Plymouth Breakwater =

Breakwater in Plymouth Sound

Plymouth Breakwater Lighthouse
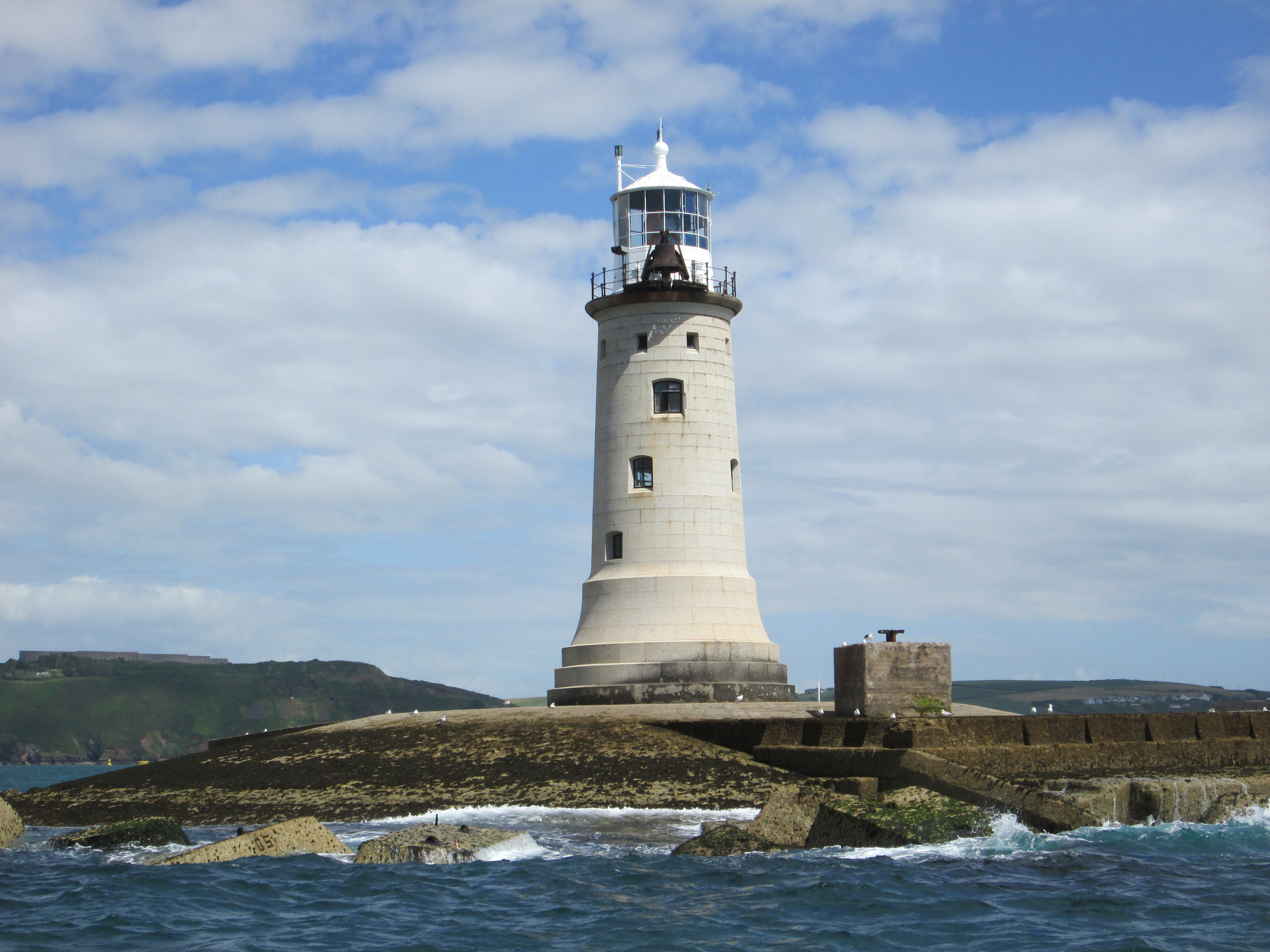
- Location: Plymouth Breakwater, City of Plymouth, United Kingdom
- Coordinates: 50°20′05″N 4°09′32″W

Tower
- Constructed: 1841; 184 years ago
- Construction: Stone Tower
- Height: 23 m (75 ft)
- Shape: Cylindrical tower with balcony and lantern
- Markings: White tower and lantern
- Operator: Ministry of Defence (1993–), Trinity House (–1993)
- Fog signal: Blast every 15s.

Light
- First lit: 1844; 181 years ago
- Focal height: 19 m (62 ft)
- Lens: 2nd order fixed catadioptric
- Range: 12 nmi (22 km; 14 mi) (white), 9 nmi (17 km; 10 mi) (red)
- Characteristic: Fl WR 10s. Iso W 4s. at 12 metres (39 ft)

Plymouth Breakwater is a 1,560-metre (1,710 yd) stone breakwater protecting Plymouth Sound and the anchorages near Plymouth, Devon, England. It is 13 metres (43 ft) wide at the top and the base is 65 metres (213 ft). It lies in about 10 metres (33 ft) of water. Around 4 million tons of rock were used in its construction in 1812 at the then-colossal cost of £1.5 million (equivalent to £126 million today).

== History ==
In 1806, as the Napoleonic Wars impended, Lord St. Vincent commissioned John Rennie and Joseph Whidbey to plan a means of making Plymouth Bay a safe anchorage for the Channel Fleet. These plans may have been taken from ones made by George Matcham (1753 – 3 February 1833). In 1811 came the order to begin construction; Whidbey was appointed Acting Superintending Engineer. This task required great engineering, organizational and political skills, as the many strictly technical challenges were complicated by the significant resources devoted to the project, from which various parties evidenced a desire for advantage. Nearly 4,000,000 (four million) tons of stone were quarried and transported, using about a dozen ships innovatively designed by the two engineers. A paper to the Royal Society suggests that Whidbey found many fossils as a result of the quarrying necessary to the breakwater.

The foundation stone was laid on Shovel Rock on 8 August 1812. It followed a line over Panther Rock, Shovel and St. Carlos Rocks, and was sufficiently completed by 1814 to shelter ships of the line. Napoleon was reported as commenting that the breakwater was a grand thing, as he passed by it on the way to exile on St. Helena in 1815. Severe storm damage in 1817 and 1824 prompted a change in the profile and height. John Rennie died in 1821; his last work in connection with the breakwater was to draw up proposals for a lighthouse. Whidbey continued to work on the breakwater and other engineering projects, including the breakwater's lighthouse, until retirement around 1830; the work was completed by Rennie's sons, George and Sir John.

=== Plymouth Breakwater Lighthouse ===
Plymouth Breakwater Lighthouse stands on the western tip of the breakwater. Designed for the Admiralty by Walker & Burgess, construction of the granite tower began on 22 February 1841 and was completed on 9 November 1843; William Stuart was superintendent of the works. The light became operational in June 1844; soon afterwards a horse-drawn omnibus was driven along the breakwater from end to end, with a full complement of passengers accompanied by a military band. On completion, management of the light was transferred to Trinity House.

A beacon was placed at the eastern end of the breakwater, consisting of a 6-foot (1.8 m) spherical cage on a 17-foot (5.2 m) pole; the cage was designed as a refuge for six shipwrecked sailors.

The lighthouse had been provided with a second-order catadioptric lens array by Henry Lepaute of Paris; it showed a fixed red light with a white sector indicating an anchorage to the north-east (later the colours were reversed). Since 1854 a second white light has also been displayed, from a window lower down in the tower, indicating a channel between two hazards: the Draystone and the Knap; it used a small, sixth-order dioptric lens.

By 1867 a 7 cwt bell had been installed at the lighthouse to serve as a fog signal. In 1879 a larger (32 cwt) bell was installed, and the old bell was transferred to Gunfleet Lighthouse. (The new bell had previously been in use at Start Point lighthouse, where a fog siren had replaced it two years earlier). The bell sounded four strokes every minute in foggy weather. The following year, the light was made occulting (being eclipsed for three seconds every half minute).

In 1920 the lighthouse was converted to run automatically on acetylene gas. Following departure of the resident keepers, the light was monitored from the Trinity House fog signal station at nearby Penlee Point.

Oversight of the lighthouse was passed from Trinity House to the Ministry of Defence in 1993. The bell remained in use until 1994, when it was replaced by an electronic fog horn. The main light currently flashes once every ten seconds, white with a red sector to the north-east; the subsidiary white light has an isophase characteristic, two seconds on, two seconds off.

=== Plymouth Breakwater Fort ===
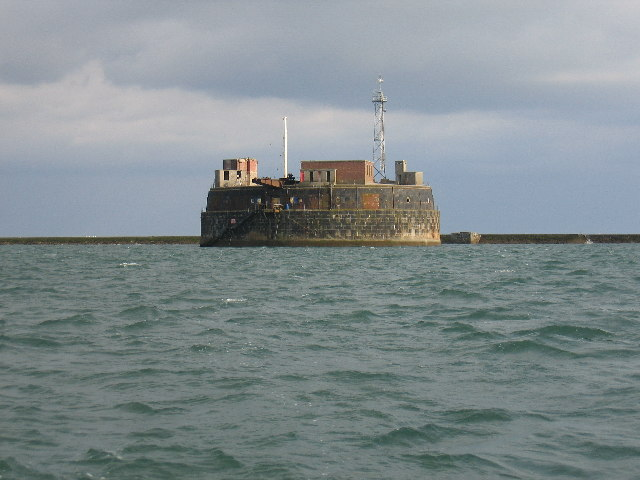
Plymouth Breakwater Fort from inside the Sound

In 1860, a Royal Commission, established by Lord Palmerston, produced a plan for the defence of Plymouth and other Royal Dockyards. The Breakwater Fort was designed to defend the entrances to Plymouth Sound in conjunction with forts and batteries on either shore. Designed by Captain Siborne, work on the oval masonry sea fort started in 1861 and the main structure was completed in 1865. It has its foundations on Shovel Rock and is 35 yards inside the Breakwater. After several changes in plan, the fort was finally armed in 1879 with fourteen 12.5-inch and four 10-inch rifled muzzle-loading guns in armoured casemates. Although the fort had been disarmed before World War I, it served as a signal station, and from 1937, an anti-aircraft training school. It was finally released by the military in 1976.

== Gallery ==
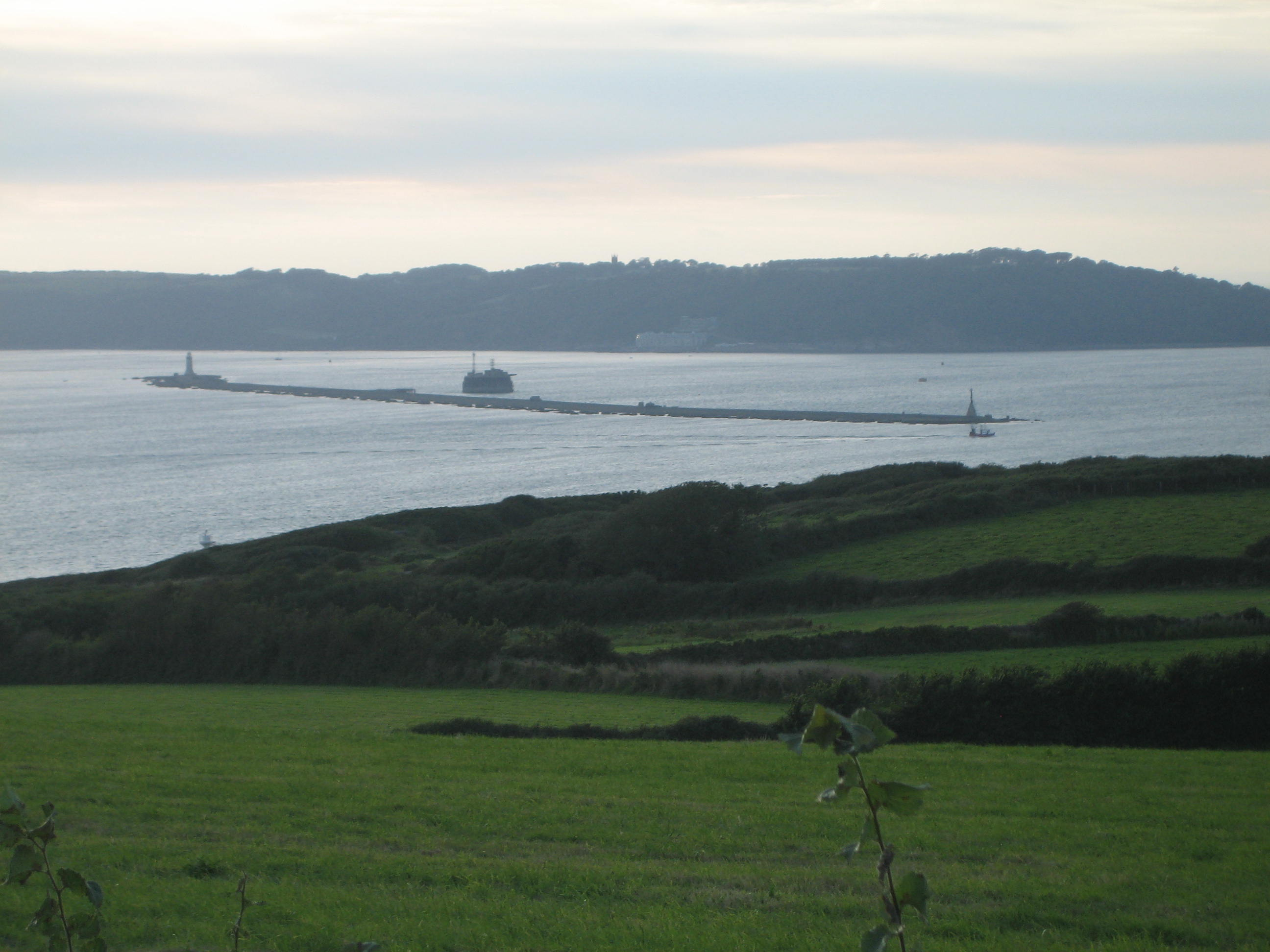
Plymouth breakwater from Wembury

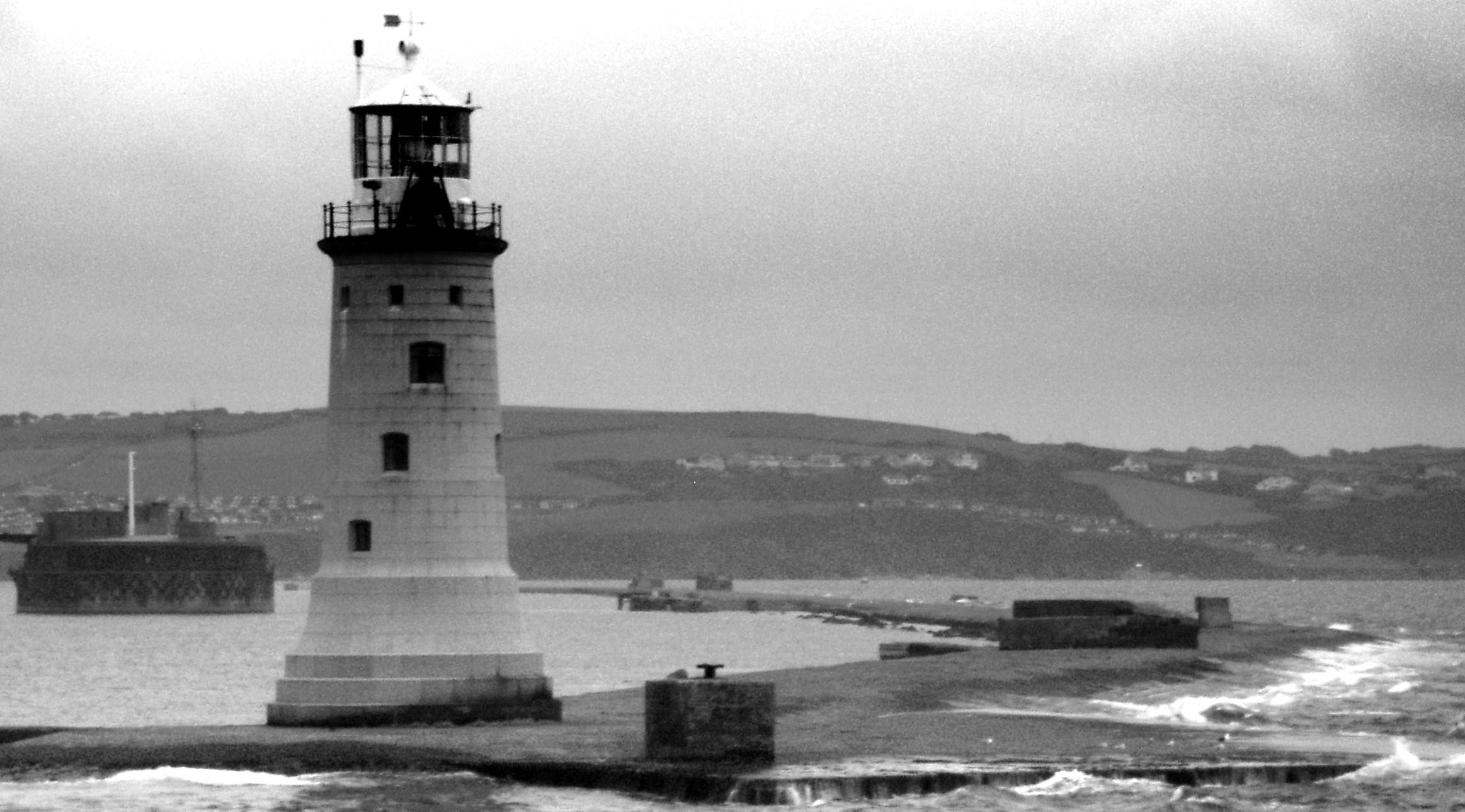
Plymouth breakwater from Kingsand, showing the 1844 lighthouse and the separate Breakwater Fort beyond

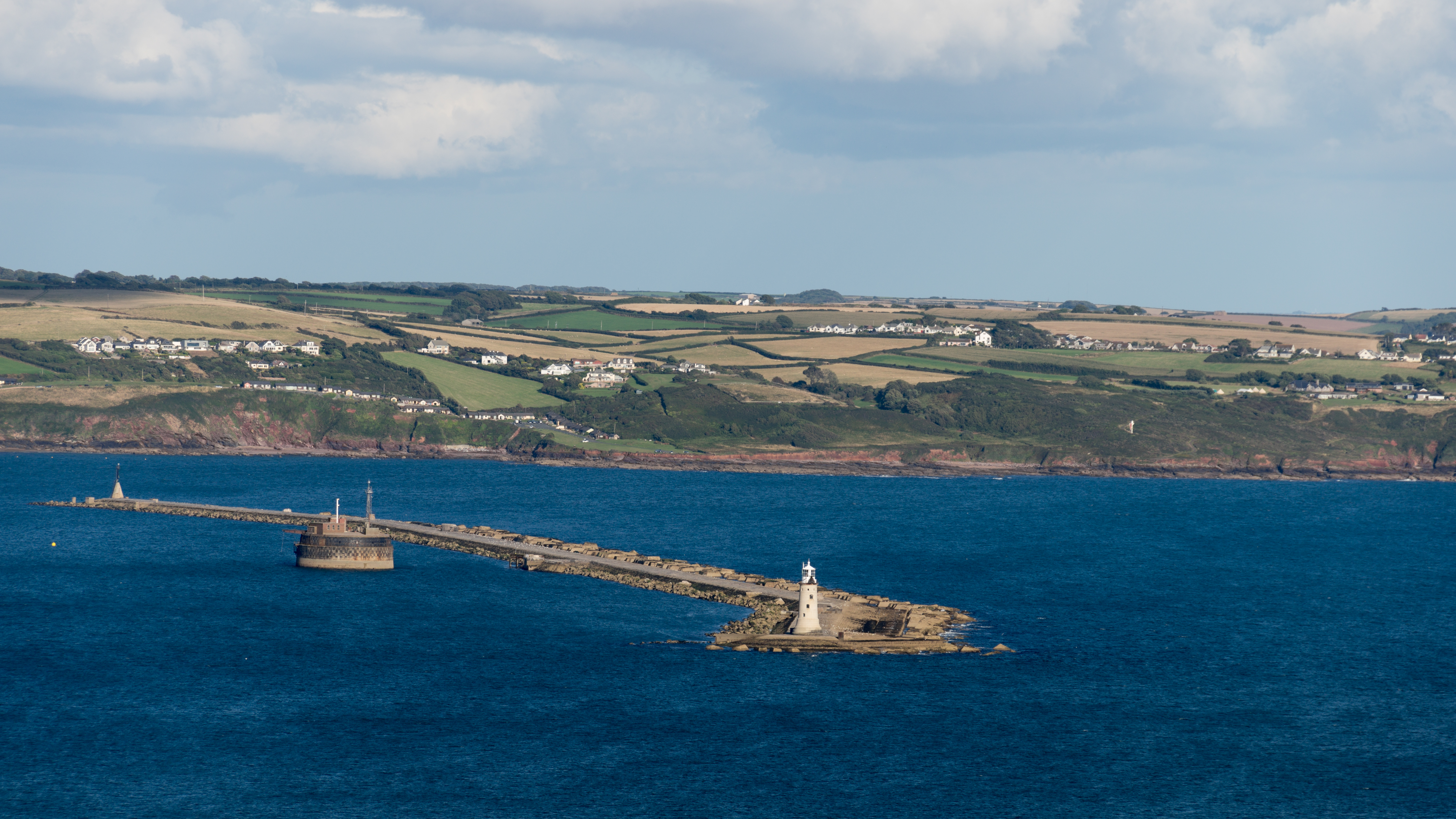
Plymouth breakwater, viewed from above Kingsand

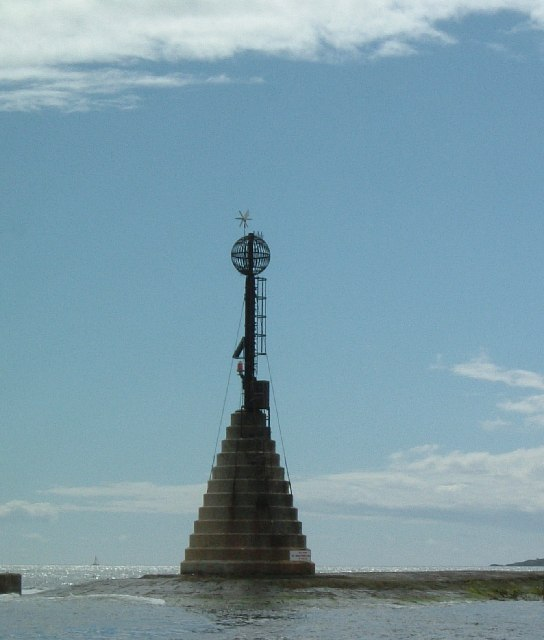
Plymouth breakwater: the eastern beacon

== See also ==
- National Harbor of Refuge, a comparable structure at the mouth of Delaware Bay in the United States, intended principally for civilian use.
- List of lighthouses in England
