= Stamford Fort =

Fort in Plymouth, Devon, England

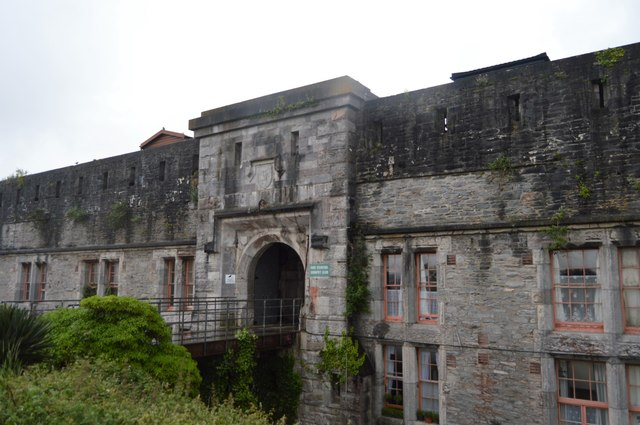
- Rear of Stamford Fort, showing the main entrance and barrack accommodation

Site information
- Type: Fort
- Open to the public: Yes
- Condition: Complete

Location
- Coordinates: 50°21′21″N 4°07′06″W

Site history
- Built: 1861-1869
- Built by: G Roach & Company, Plymouth
- Materials: Earth; Masonry

Stamford Fort is a 19th-century fort, built as a result of the Royal Commission on National Defence of 1859. Part of an extensive scheme known as Palmerston Forts, after the prime minister who championed the scheme, it was built to defend the landward approaches to the east of Plymouth, as an element of the plan for the defence of the Royal Naval Dockyard at Devonport. It is 165 feet above sea level, between Jennycliffe Bay and Hooe Lake.

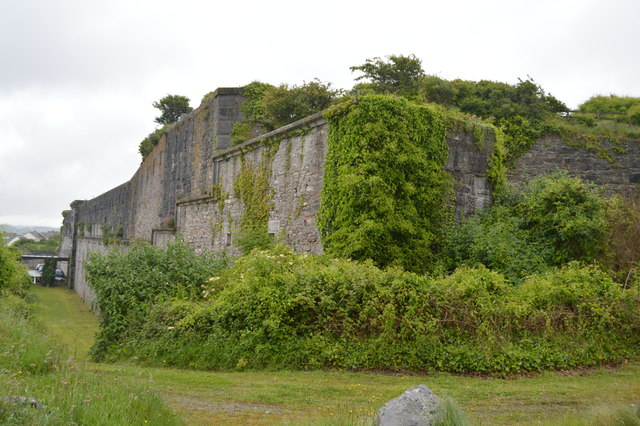
Dry ditch at the rear of Fort Stamford, showing one of the Caponiers which could defend the ditch if necessary

Designed by Captain (later Maj General) Edmund Frederick Du Cane, it was built by George Roach and Company, who also built Staddon Fort. It was built as a five sided polygonal fort, surrounded by a dry ditch. Three sides face landward, one seaward, whilst the rear faces the Cattewater. The ditch was defended with three caponiers and a counter-scarp gallery. The fort was connected by a military road to the nearby Staddon Fort. To house the fort's garrison a barrack block for 200 men was built within the rear section of the fort, arranged in 13 casemates, on two floors. These have now been converted into flats.

It was designed to be armed with 20 guns and 6 mortars. By 1893 it mounted five 64 Pounder Rifled Muzzle Loading Guns, one 7-inch Rifled Breech Loading (RBL) gun and two 10-inch Rifled Muzzle Loading (RML) guns.

By the early 1900s the fort had become obsolete as a defensive position and was disarmed in 1904. It was sold off by the War Office in 1963. It is now used as a caravan park, fitness centre and private flats. It was Scheduled in 1963.

== Bibliography ==
- Hogg, Ian V (1974). Coast Defences of England and Wales 1856-1956. David & Charles. ISBN 0-7153 6353-0.
- Pye, Andrew; Woodward, Freddy (1996). The Historic Defences of Plymouth. Cornwall County Council. ISBN 978-1898166467.
