= Brownhill Battery =

- Plymouth; Devon; England

Site information
- Open to the public: No

Location
- Coordinates: 50.3402°N 4.1171°W

Site history
- Built: 1861–c. 1868

Brownhill Battery is a former gun battery at Staddon Heights, Plymouth, Devon. It was one of a number of Plymouth fortifications to be recommended by the Royal Commission on the Defence of the United Kingdom in 1859. Construction began in 1861, at the same time as Staddon Fort and other defensive works at Staddon Heights. The battery was completed by 1868, but was left unarmed.

The battery was designed with a five-sided earthwork rampart containing a number of gun emplacements, with a ditch spanning the front. The west side of the battery is protected by a gorge wall with loopholes. In 1875, eight RML 64-pounder 64 cwt guns were assigned to the battery, but stored at Staddon Fort. By 1885, the battery was armed with six RML 8-inch howitzers. The battery is believed to have ceased use around World War I. The site is now overgrown and is used for agricultural purposes, but much of the battery remains intact and is protected as a scheduled monument.

== Bibliography ==
- Woodward, Freddy (1996). The Historic Defences of Plymouth. Cornwall County Council. ISBN 978-1898166467.
