= Woodland Fort =

Coordinates: 50°24′48″N 4°09′25″W

- Plymouth; Devon; England
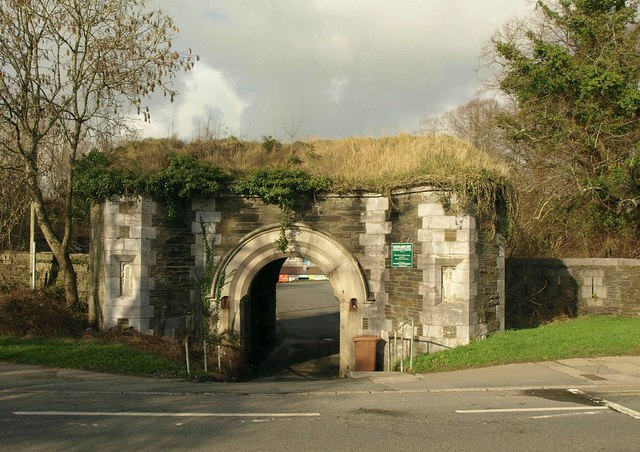
- Main entrance to the Fort in 2011

Site information
- Owner: Plymouth City Council
- Open to the public: Partly
- Condition: Partly derelict

Location

Site history
- Built: 1863-69
- In use: 1869-date
- Materials: Masonry; Earth

Woodland (or Woodlands) Fort is a Royal Commission Fort built in the 1860s as part of Lord Palmerston's ring of land defences for Plymouth, England. Currently owned by Plymouth City Council, the site is in use but largely derelict.

== History of the fort ==
Woodland Fort is one of the Palmerston Forts that form Plymouth's north eastern defences, whose purpose was to defend the Royal Dockyard at Devonport from the possibility of a French attack, under the leadership of Napoleon III. Designed by Captain (later Maj General) Edmund Frederick Du Cane, it was built by George Baker and Company and finished by the Royal Engineers.

It was released by the military in 1920, and eventually became Grade II listed, and is currently on Historic Englands' Buildings at Risk Register.

== Structure of Woodland Fort ==
Woodland Fort has a trapezoidal shape incorporating many advanced Victorian fort design ideas. The soldiers' barracks are north of the parade ground and the now-ruined cookhouse is to the north west. The magazines are to the north east. There is a caponier to the north west covering the west flank and a counterscarp gallery to the north east. This gallery was accessed via a tunnel heading beneath the ditch and provides flanking fire along the north and east lengths of the defensive ditch. The gatehouse is sited to the south of the fort and retains some of the original drawbridge mechanism.

== Woodland Fort today ==
Unlike its neighbours, Woodland Fort is largely derelict. The former barracks are still in use and maintained by a group of volunteers but other areas of the fort suffer from a lack of maintenance and vandalism. Both the caponier and counterscarp are inaccessible from within the fort. When Crownhill Road was enlarged the ditch to the south of the fort was filled in allowing easy access to the fort on foot although the site is not open to the public.

== Bibliography ==
- Hogg, Ian V (1974). Coast Defences of England and Wales 1856-1956. David & Charles. ISBN 0-7153 6353-0.
- Woodward, Freddy (1996). The Historic Defences of Plymouth. Cornwall County Council. ISBN 978-1898166467.
