= Watch House Battery =

Coordinates: 50°19′27″N 4°6′56″W

- Devon; England

Site information
- Open to the public: No
- Condition: Complete; disarmed

Location

Site history
- Built: 1864-1865; Rebuilt 1901-1904
- Materials: Earth; Concrete

Watch House Battery is a former 19th-century gun battery, built as one of a number of batteries to defend the Eastern approaches to Plymouth Sound, for the defence of the Royal Naval Dockyard at Devonport.

The battery was originally built as a small pentagonal redoubt with emplacements for five guns. By 1893 it was armed with two 64 Pounder Rifled Muzzle Loading Guns. In 1901 the battery was reconstructed for two 6-inch Mark VII breech loading guns with the work being completed in 1903. During the First World War the battery was manned by the Devonshire Royal Garrison Artillery.

After the Second World War the battery remained armed until the dissolution of coast artillery in the United Kingdom in 1956 when it was disarmed. It was released by the military and subsequently used as a children's activity centre for some years. It was Grade II listed in 1969.

== Bibliography ==
- Hogg, Ian V (1974). Coast Defences of England and Wales 1856-1956. David & Charles. ISBN 0-7153 6353-0.
- Woodward, Freddy (1996). The Historic Defences of Plymouth. Cornwall County Council. ISBN 978-1898166467.

== External sources ==
- Victorian Forts data sheet on Watch House Battery
