= Laira Battery =

Fort next to Plymouth, England

- Plymouth; Devon; England

Site information
- Open to the public: No
- Condition: Mostly intact, some parts demolished

Location
- Coordinates: 50.38°N 4.10°W

Site history
- Built: 1863-1871
- In use: Now plant hire depot
- Materials: Earth; Masonry

Laira Battery is a former 19th-century fort next to Plymouth, England. It was built as a result of the Royal Commission on National Defence of 1859 to defend the landward approaches to the north east of Plymouth. This was part of an overall scheme for the defence of the Royal Naval Dockyard at Devonport. They were known as Palmerston Forts after the Prime Minister who championed the scheme.

It was designed to be armed with 13 guns and overlooked the River Laira. To house part of the Forts' Garrison a barrack block to house two officers and 30 men was built within the rear section of the Fort. Some of the gun positions were in protected Haxo casemates and a vaulted magazine stored the ammunition for the guns.

By the early 1900s the Fort had become obsolete as a defensive position and was disarmed. It was sold by the War Office in 1961. It was Grade II listed in 2003. It is now used as a plant hire yard.

== Bibliography ==
- Hogg, Ian V (1974). Coast Defences of England and Wales 1856-1956. David & Charles. ISBN 0-7153 6353-0.
- Woodward, Freddy (1996). The Historic Defences of Plymouth. Cornwall County Council. ISBN 978-1898166467.

== External sources ==
- Palmerston Forts Society
