= Tregantle Fort =

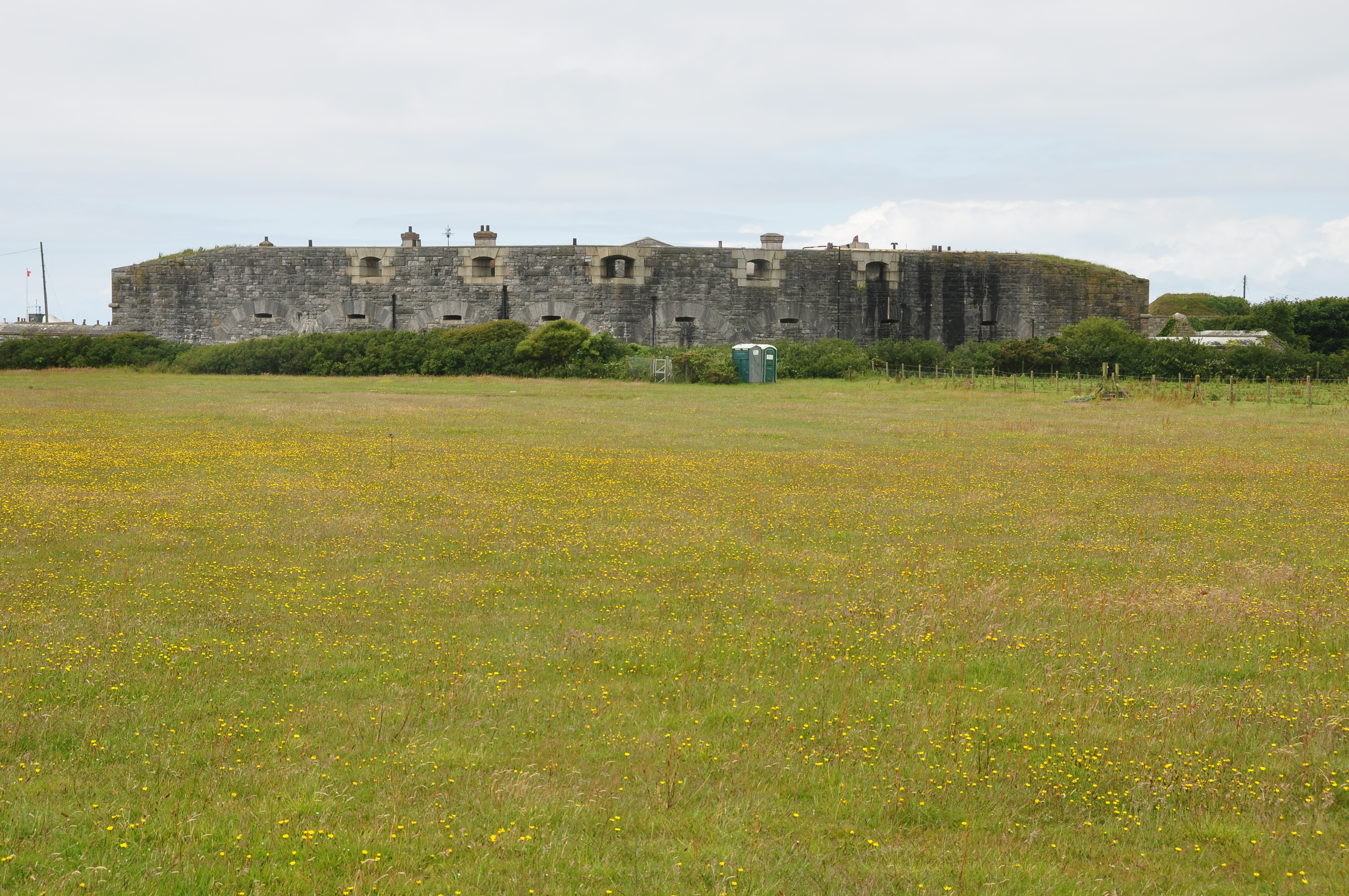
- Rear view of the Fort, showing windows of accommodation casemates

Site information
- Owner: Ministry of Defence
- Open to the public: No
- Condition: Complete

Location
- Coordinates: 50.357071°N 4.270042°W

Site history
- Built: 1859-1865
- In use: Training base Rifle range
- Materials: Earth; Masonry

Scheduled monument
- Official name: Tregantle Fort
- Designated: 19 January 1968
- Reference no.: 1004346

Listed Building – Grade II
- Official name: Tregantle Fort
- Designated: 26 January 1987
- Reference no.: 1159255

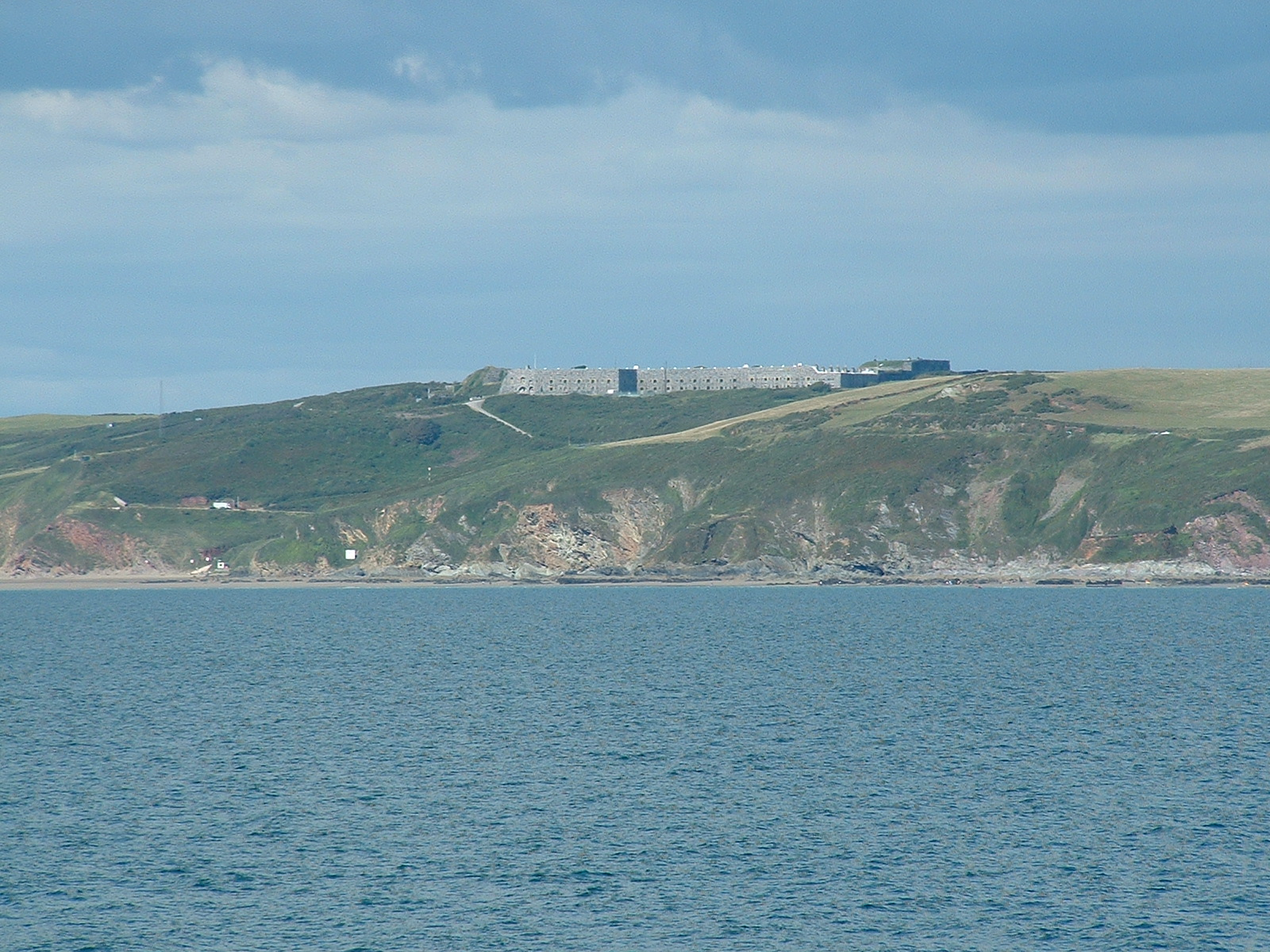
The fort viewed from the sea

Tregantle Fort in south east Cornwall is one of several forts surrounding Plymouth that were built as a result of a decision in Lord Palmerston's premiership to deter the French from attacking naval bases on the Channel coast.

== History ==
The fort was originally designed by Captain William Crossman, with later modifications by Captain (later Maj General) Edmund Frederick Du Cane, Construction commenced in 1859 and was completed in 1865.

When originally designed it had provision for 35 large guns. By 1893 the guns consisted of five RBL 7 inch Armstrong guns and nineteen RML 64-pounders, together with a number of 32 Pounder Smooth Bore Breech Loading (SBBL) guns.

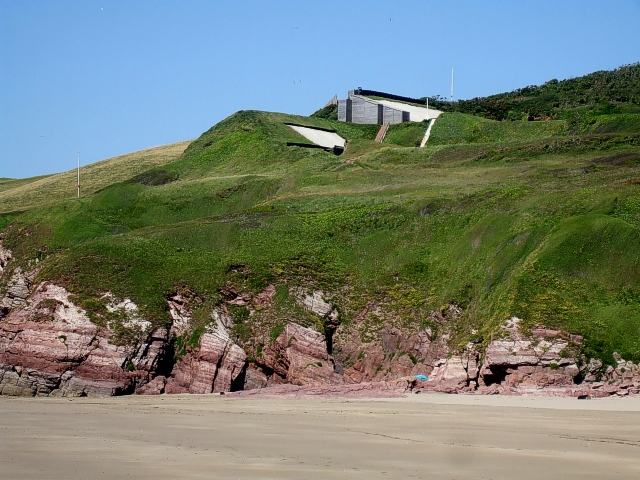
Rifle butts below the fort

It was also designed with barrack accommodation for 2,000 men in two-tiered casemates at the rear of the Fort. In the event, far smaller garrisons have been based there, with only six gunners in 1882.

Early in the 1900s it became an infantry battalion headquarters with 14 officers and 423 other ranks, and from 1903 was used for rifle training. Tregantle is infamous within the armed forces because many of the rifle ranges located there slope steeply down towards the sea. These ranges are still in use, primarily by personnel located at HMS Raleigh.

Tregantle was vacated after World War I until 1938, when it was used as the Territorial Army Passive Air Defence School. During World War II it was used first as the Army Gas School and from 1942 as US Army accommodation.

Since 1945 the fort, and the cliffs, beach and sea to the south-west, have been in use by the British Armed Forces. It is currently part of the Defence Estate and used for Royal Marine training. It is also used by specialist Royal Naval EW teams (FEWSG) for the monitoring of ship's communications in the area. FEWSG operate specialist coded transmission scenarios from Tregantle Fort and surrounding areas for Naval warships to decode at sea as part of an ongoing training schedule. In January 2020 a Royal Marine died in a training exercise off the beach.

== Tregantle Down high-angle battery ==
A few hundred yards southeast of Tregantle Fort, along the north side of the road, there was constructed in the 1890s a battery of four 9-inch muzzle-loading guns on "high-angle" mountings. These were intended to fire shells along a high curving trajectory to more easily penetrate the decks of ships at sea to the south. Although the guns and mountings are long gone and the site is filled in, the area is clearly recognisable in aerial photographs.

== Bibliography ==
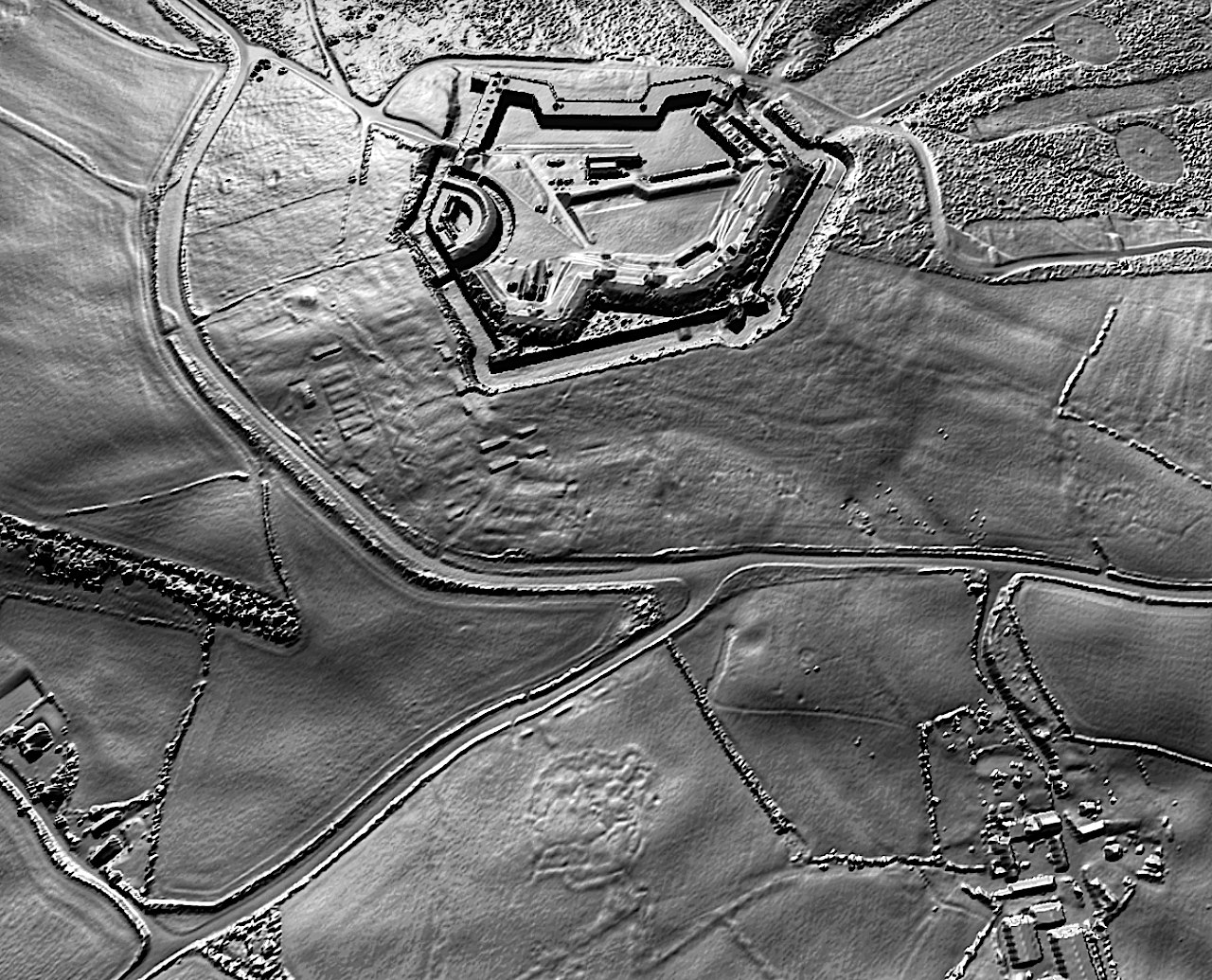
A lidar view of the fort.

- Hogg, Ian V (1974). Coast Defences of England and Wales 1856-1956. David & Charles. ISBN 0-7153 6353-0.
- Woodward, Freddy (1996). The Historic Defences of Plymouth. Cornwall County Council. ISBN 978-1898166467.
