= Penlee Battery =

Nature reserve in Cornwall, England

Coordinates: 50°19′13″N 4°11′35″W

- Rame Head; Cornwall; England

Site information
- Open to the public: Yes

Location

Site history
- Built: 1889-92
- In use: 1892-1956
- Materials: Concrete; Earth
- Demolished: Mostly filled in

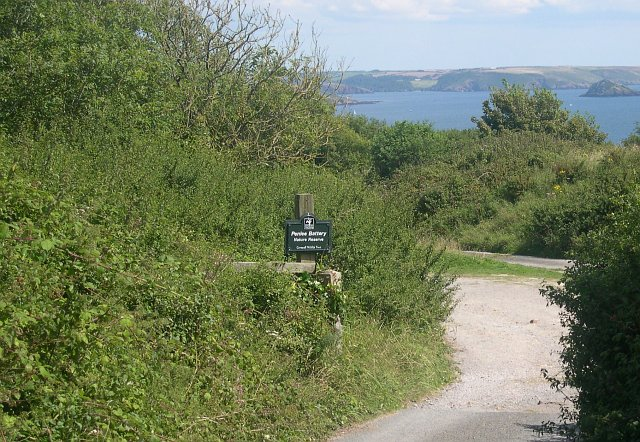
Penlee Battery today as a Nature Reserve.

Penlee Battery is a nature reserve lying on the coastal headland of Penlee Point on the Rame Peninsula, in southeast Cornwall, England.

The site was formerly the location of a gun battery, constructed between 1889 and 1892. It was originally armed with two 6-inch BL guns and a 13.5-inch BL, the latter of which was the largest gun of the Plymouth defences. During World War I and II, the battery's armament was made up of three 9.2-inch guns.

After the dissolution of coast artillery in the United Kingdom in 1956 the battery was disarmed and disposed of by the War Office. Many parts of the battery were demolished and gun positions filled in during the 1970s. One of the 6-inch emplacements remains intact, while the battery's magazines remain underground, but are filled in.

It is home to a beach revealed at low tide, and is famous among dragonfly enthusiasts as the site where Britain's first Green Darner dragonfly was found, in 1998.

== Bibliography ==
- Hogg, Ian V (1974). Coast Defences of England and Wales 1856-1956. David & Charles. ISBN 0-7153 6353-0.
- Woodward, Freddy (1996). The Historic Defences of Plymouth. Cornwall County Council. ISBN 978-1898166467.
