= Hawkins Battery =

Artillery battery at Devonport

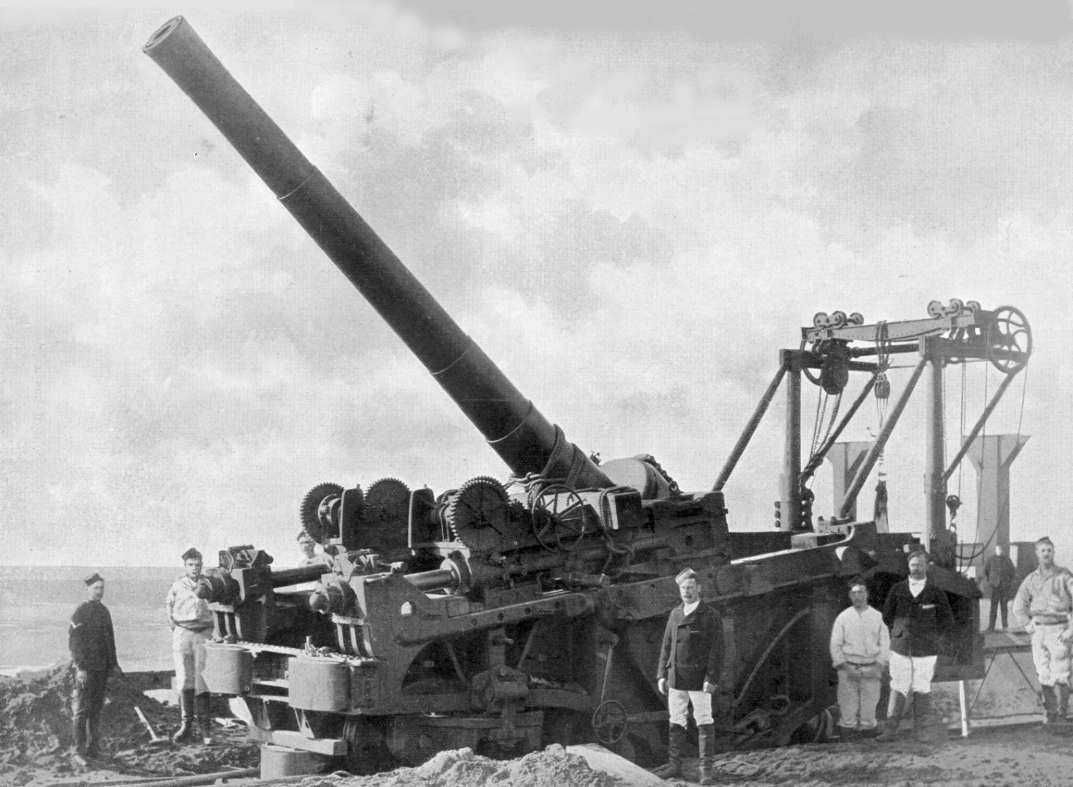
- Two 9.2-inch Breech Loading High Angle fire guns were mounted in the battery after 1910.

Site information
- Owner: Privately owned
- Open to the public: No
- Condition: Complete

Location
- Coordinates: 50°20′36″N 4°11′43″W,

Site history
- Built: 1888-1892
- Materials: Masonry; Concrete

Hawkins Battery is a former coastal artillery battery, built to defend the Royal Naval Dockyard at Devonport.

The battery was originally built between 1888 and 1892 to mount four 9-inch Rifled Muzzle Loading (RML) guns on high angle mountings, which were all mounted. These guns could provide high angle, plunging fire onto more lightly armoured decks of enemy warships attempting to enter Plymouth Sound.

The battery is enclosed by concrete walls, with three small caponiers, built like pill boxes to provide enfilading fire along the ditches. The gun positions were served by underground magazines. The battery was built with caretaker's accommodation and crew shelters for the gun detachments who would man the battery in time of war.

The battery was upgraded with newer armament after 1910 when the battery was re-modelled for two 9.2-inch Breech Loading (BL) high angle fire guns. These remained in place until 1922 when they were dismounted. The battery was used for further military purposes during the Second World War, but was sold by the War Office in 1959.

The battery remains complete and is now run as a camping and holiday park.

== Bibliography ==
- Hogg, Ian V (1974). Coast Defences of England and Wales 1856–1956. David & Charles. ISBN 0-7153 6353-0.
- Woodward, Freddy (1996). The Historic Defences of Plymouth. Cornwall County Council. ISBN 978-1898166467.
