= 2nd Devonshire Artillery Volunteers =

British military unit

2nd Devonshire Artillery Volunteers Devonshire Royal Garrison Artillery 566th (Devon) Coast Regiment, RA 407th (Devon) Coast Regiment, RA
- Cap Badge of the Royal Artillery (pre-1953)
- Active: 3 January 1861–31 October 1961
- Country: United Kingdom
- Branch: Territorial Army
- Role: Coastal Artillery
- Garrison/HQ: Devonport, Plymouth
- Engagements: World War I World War II

The 2nd Devonshire Artillery Volunteers was a unit of the British Volunteer Force and Territorial Army. The unit and its successors defended Plymouth Dockyard and the Devon coast from 1861 to 1961.

== Origin ==
The 2nd Administrative Brigade, Devonshire Artillery Volunteers was formed at Devonport, Plymouth on 3 January 1861 as a headquarters for a number of Artillery Volunteer Corps (AVCs) that had been raised in Devonshire in response to the invasion scare of 1859. A 1st Administrative Brigade had been formed the previous year, but the number of units in the county had continued to grow and they were split between the two headquarters. The 2nd Admin Brigade took the units in the western part of the county and was based at Devonport, Plymouth, with the following composition:

- 6th (Dartmouth) Devonshire AVC, raised 25 January 1860; transferred from 1st to 2nd Administrative Brigade in January 1861
- 10th (Salcombe) Devonshire AVC, raised 7 July 1860; transferred from 1st to 2nd Administrative Brigade in January 1861
- 12th (Devonport Dockyard) Devonshire AVC, raised 20 December 1860; transferred from 1st to 2nd Administrative Brigade in February 1862
- 13th (Keyham) Devonshire AVC, raised 7 December 1860; the nucleus came from the Keyham Steam Factory

The unit's HQ moved from Devonport to Dartmouth in 1874 before returning three years later. The commanding officer from 1864 was Lieutenant-Colonel Charles Hayne, who was also a captain in the South Devon Militia. He was succeeded by Lt-Col Alex Ridgway, a former captain in the 1st Devon Militia (appointed 1873). By 1866, the 12th AVC had four companies and the 13th had two. A cadet corps was attached to the unit from 1871 to 1879.

In February 1880, the AVCs were consolidated, and the 2nd Devonshire Administrative Brigade became the 6th (soon changed to 2nd) Devonshire AVC with the following composition:

- No 1 Battery at Dartmouth, former 6th Corps
- No 2 Battery at Salcombe, former 10th Corps
- Nos 3, 4, 5 & 6 Batteries at Devonport, former 12th Corps
- Nos 7 & 8 Batteries at Keyham, former 13th Corps

In 1893, the HQ and Nos 1 and 3–9 Companies were based at 14 Paradise Place at Stoke in Devonport, and No 2 Company was at Ridge Park Road, Plympton, and Fore Street, Salcombe at Fore Street, Salcombe. In the same year, the War Office Mobilisation Scheme had allocated the 2nd Devonshire Artillery Volunteers to the Plymouth fixed defences.

The corps was attached to the Western Division of the Royal Artillery (RA) in April 1882 and changed its name to 2nd Devonshire Volunteer Artillery in November 1891. All the artillery volunteers were attached to the Royal Garrison Artillery (RGA) in 1899, and when the divisional structure was abolished the units were retitled, the unit was retitled 2nd Devonshire RGA (Volunteers) on 1 January 1902. A new cadet corps was formed at Plymouth and Mannamead College in 1900, but was transferred to the 2nd (Prince of Wales's) Volunteer Battalion, Devonshire Regiment in 1907.

== Territorial Force ==
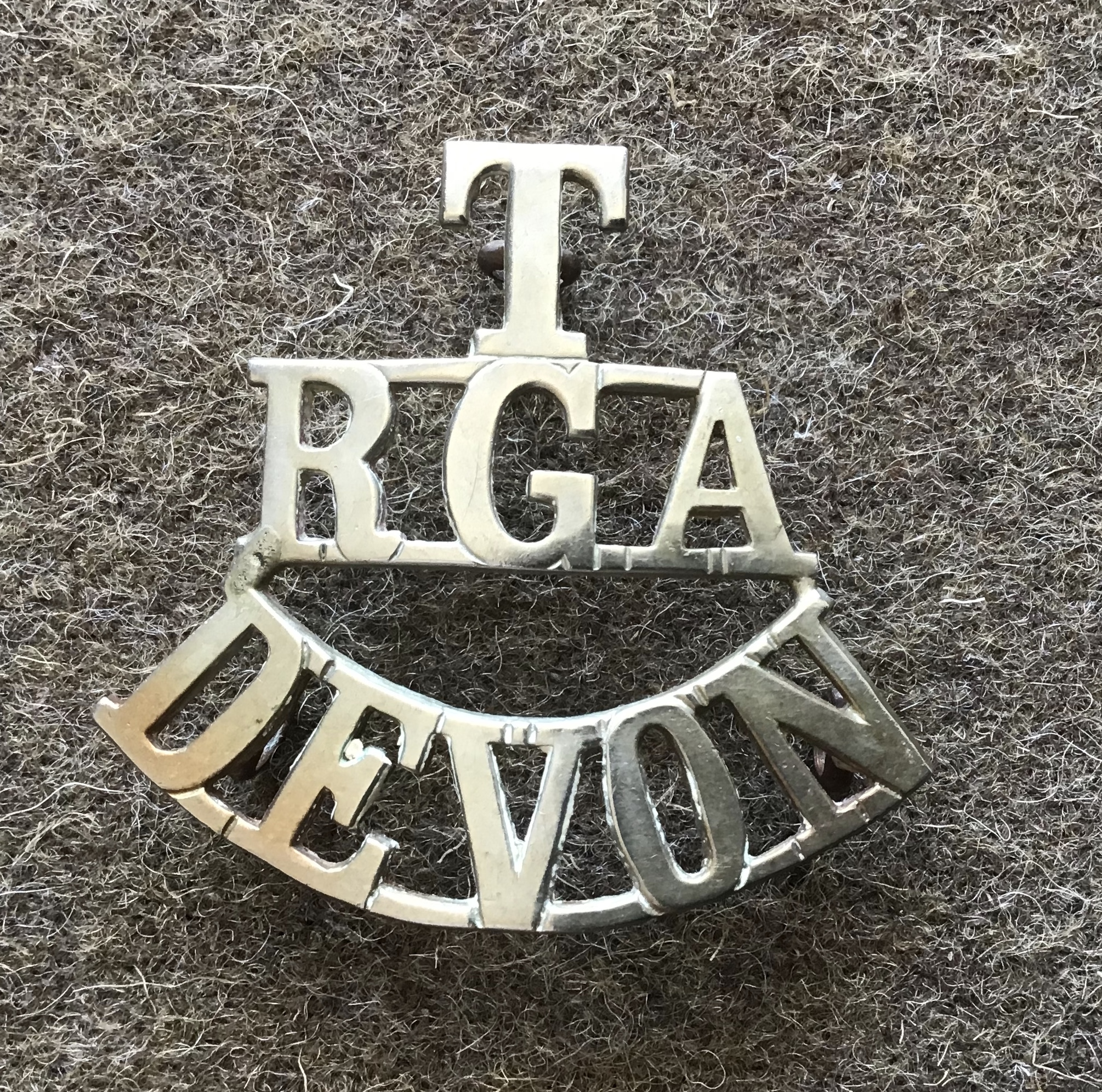
Unit shoulder title.

When the Volunteers were subsumed into the new Territorial Force (TF) under the Haldane Reforms of 1908, the 2nd Devonshire RGA became simply the Devonshire RGA as a Defended Ports unit with the following composition:

- HQ at Lambhay Hill, Plymouth
- No 1 Heavy Battery at Drill Hall, Avenue Road, Ilfracombe, with Left Section detached at Lynmouth
- No 2 Heavy Battery at Devonport, with detachments at Plympton and Salcombe
- Nos 3 & 4 Companies at Plymouth
- Nos 5 & 6 Companies at Devonport

Until 1908, the battery at Ilfracombe (two new 6-inch breech-loading guns were installed at Beacon Point in 1905) had been the responsibility of No 10 Battery of the 1st Devonshire RGA (V), which was converted into a field artillery unit under the Haldane Reforms.

The companies were responsible for manning the batteries of fixed coastal guns, while the heavy batteries were mobile and responsible for the landward defences (TF heavy batteries were usually armed with obsolescent 4.7-inch guns).

== World War I ==
The unit was mobilised in the South Western Coast Defences on the outbreak of World War I in August 1914, and raised two additional companies, Nos 1 & 2. Although the unit did not serve overseas, it is probable that volunteers did serve with other RGA units, and there is a memorial to men of the unit who died during the war.

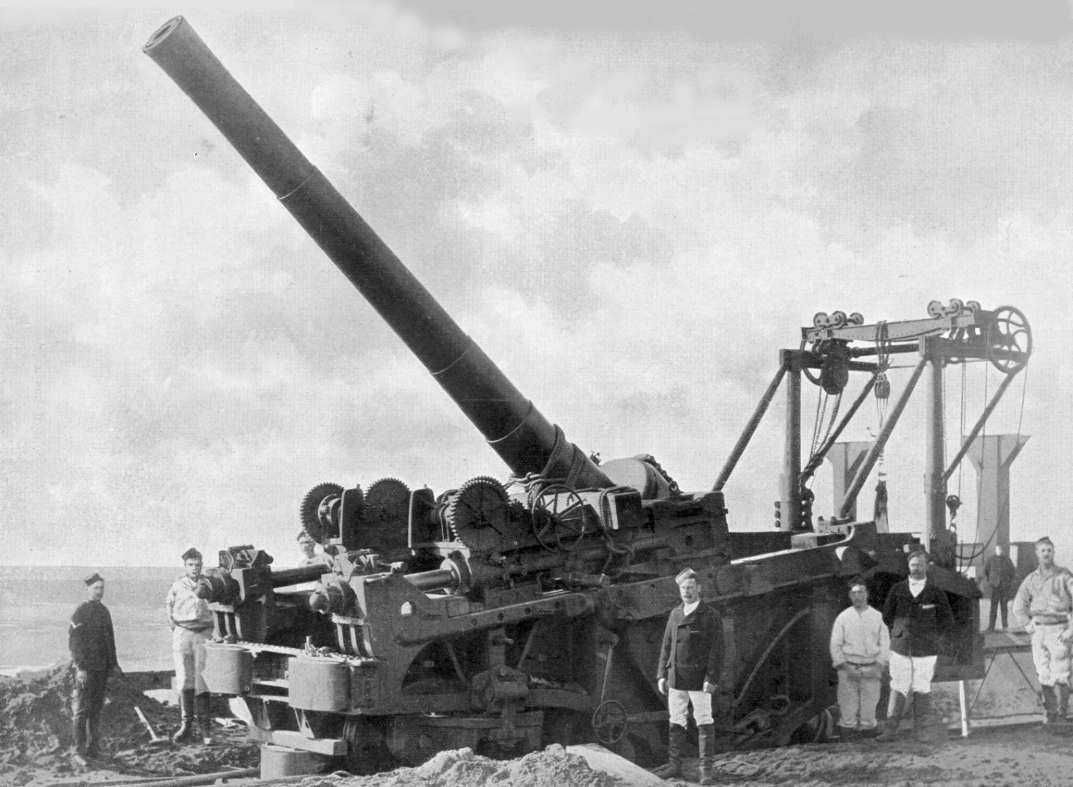
Two 9.2-inch BL High Angle fire guns were mounted in Hawkins Battery after 1910.

On the outbreak of World War I, together with Nos 36 and 45 Companies of the Regular RGA in the Eastern Section and Nos 38 and 41 Companies in the Western Section, the Devonshire RGA manned the following coast guns in the Plymouth defences:

- 8 × 9.2-inch
- 13 × 6-inch
- 3 × 4.7-inch
- 15 × 12-pounders

=== Mobilisation ===
After the outbreak of war, TF units were invited to volunteer for Overseas Service and on 15 August 1914, the War Office (WO) issued instructions to separate those men who had signed up for Home Service only, and form these into reserve units. On 31 August, the formation of a reserve or 2nd Line unit was authorised for each 1st Line unit where 60 per cent or more of the men had volunteered for Overseas Service. The titles of these 2nd Line units would be the same as the original, but distinguished by a '2/' prefix. In this way, duplicate brigades, companies and batteries were created, mirroring those TF formations being sent overseas.

By the autumn of 1914, the campaign on the Western Front was bogging down into Trench warfare and there was an urgent need for batteries of heavy and siege artillery to be sent to France. The WO decided that the TF coastal gunners were well enough trained to take over many of the duties in the coastal defences, releasing Regular RGA gunners for service in the field, and 1st line TF RGA companies that had volunteered for overseas service had been authorised to increase their strength by 50 per cent. In addition, the Devonshire RGA also seems to have formed a new No 1 Company. Although complete defended ports units never went overseas, they did supply trained gunners to RGA units serving overseas. They also provided cadres to form complete new units for front line service. The personnel of 1/1st, 2/1st and 2nd Heavy Btys all appear to have served overseas (164th and 165th Heavy Btys are known to have formed at Plymouth in April 1916). Plymouth was also the prewar depot for some of the Regular siege artillery, and at least 15 siege batteries were raised at Plymouth during the course of the war. In addition, 48th Siege Battery, RGA, was formed on 30 July 1915 at Portsmouth with a nucleus from the Devonshire RGA. Equipped with 9.2-inch howitzers it went out to the Western Front in January 1916 and served there for the rest of the war, latterly in 34th Brigade, RGA, supporting First Army.

In the interim order of battle for the postwar Regular Army produced in May 1919, the cadre of 48th Siege Battery was to form the basis of 103rd Battery in XXVI Brigade, RGA, but these plans were abandoned after the Treaty of Versailles was signed in June, and the cadre was disbanded.

=== Home defence ===
After so many TF coast gunners had departed to units in the field, the remaining companies of the defended ports units were consolidated in April 1917. By now, the companies remaining in the Plymouth Garrison were the 1/3rd, 1/5th, 2/3rd, 2/6th Devon and the 1/8th of the Cornwall (Duke of Cornwall's) RGA. These were reduced from to just four (numbered 1–4 Devon RGA), which were to be kept up to strength with Regular recruits (conscripts).

By April 1918, the guns of the Plymouth Garrison were deployed as follows:

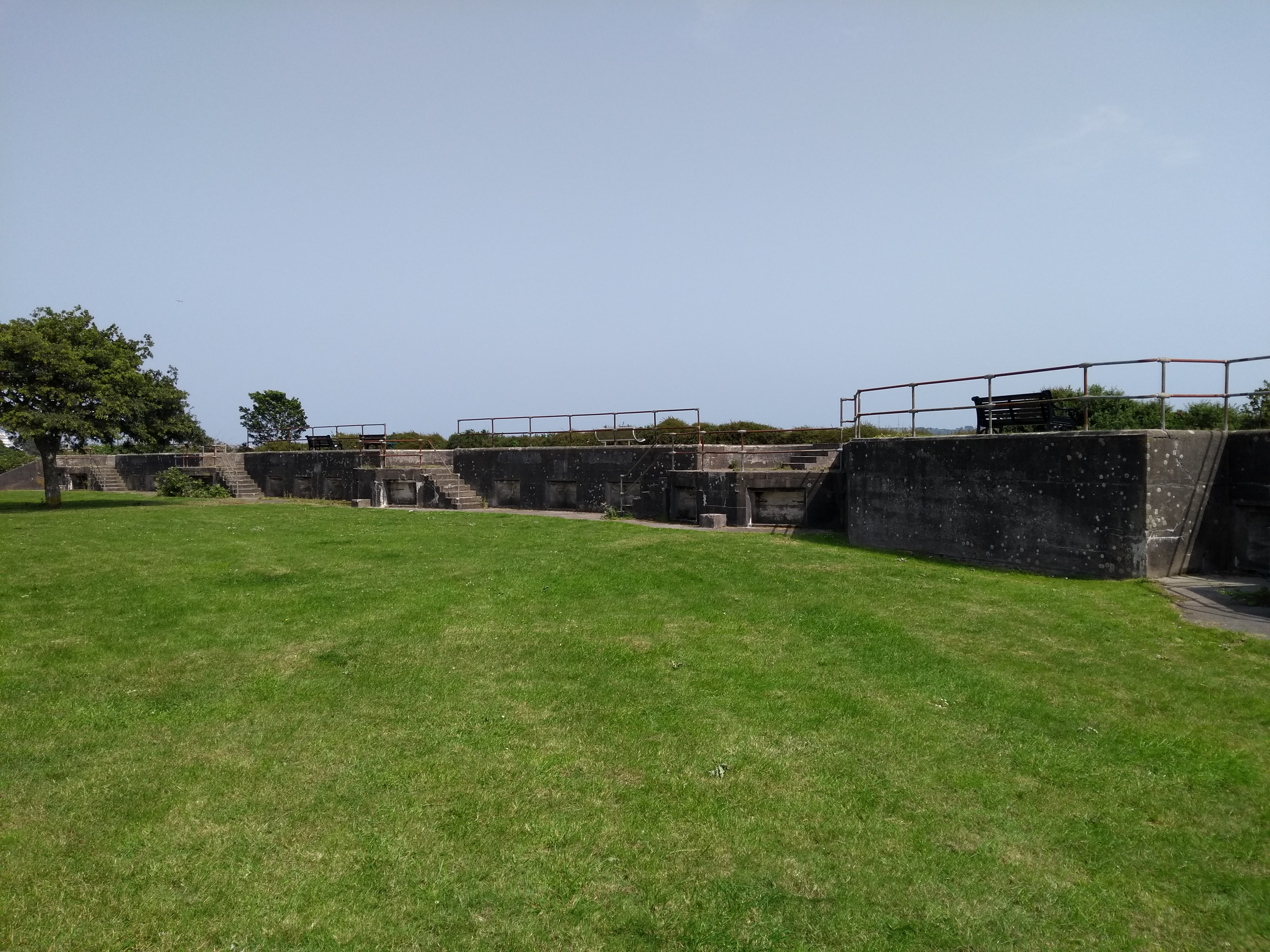
12 Pounder QF gun positions at Western King's Redoubt, 2019.

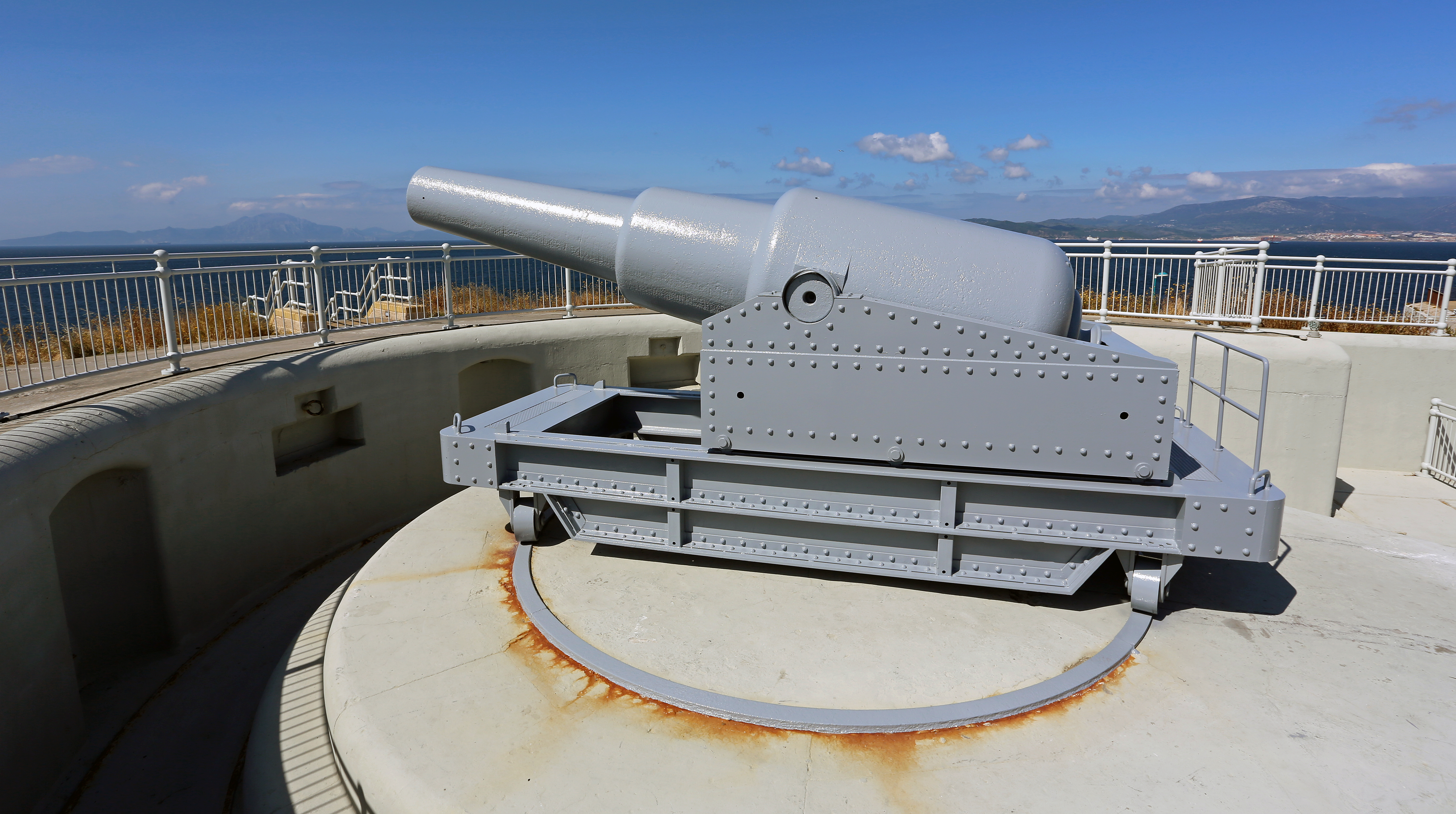
Obsolete 12.5-inch RML gun, as installed at Whitesand Bay.

Western Section:

- Rame Church Battery – 2 × 9.2-inch Mk VI
- Hawkins Battery – 2 × 9.2-inch Mk VI
- Penlee Point Battery – 3 × 9.2-inch Mk X
- Picklecombe Fort – 2 × 6-inch Mk VII
- Piers Cellars Battery – 2 × 12-pounder Quick-Firers
- Grenville Battery – 3 × 4.7-inch QF
- Whitesand Bay Battery – 3 × 12.5-inch Rifled Muzzle-Loaders

Eastern Section:

- Drake's Island Battery 1 – 3 × 6-inch Mk VII
- Drakes Island Battery 2 – 5 × 12-pdr QF
- Eastern King's Redoubt – 2 × 12-pdr QF
- Western King's Redoubt – 4 × 12-pdr QF
- Devil's Point Battery – 1 × 12-pdr QF
- Garden Battery – 2 × 12-pdr QF
- Bovisand Battery – 4 × 12-pdr QF
- Watch House Battery – 2 × 6-inch Mk VII
- Renny Point Battery – 3 × 9.2-inch Mk X
- Lentney Battery – 2 × 6-inch Mk VII

The four Devon RGA companies, together with the four regular RGA companies of the Plymouth Garrison, were split between three fire commands in 1918:

- No 2 Fire Command (formed as A and B Administrative batteries, including 38 and 41 Cos RGA): manning Penlee and Picklecombe among others
- No 3 Fire Command: Eastern Section, manning King's Bty among others
- No 4 Fire Command (including 36 and 45 Cos RGA): manning Renny and Bovisand among others

== Interwar ==
When the TF was reconstituted on 7 February 1920 the Devonshire RGA reformed at Lambhay Hill, with one battery (later numbered 157) from the former Nos 3 and 4 Companies at Lambhay Hill and another battery (later 158) from Nos 1 and 2 Heavy Btys and 5–7 Companies at Plympoton. The TF was reorganised as the Territorial Army (TA) in 1921 and the unit was redesignated the Devonshire Coast Brigade, RGA, with 157 and 158 Btys.

When the RGA was subsumed into the rest of the RA on 1 June 1924, the unit was redesignated as the Devonshire Heavy Brigade, RA. In 1927 it was decided that the coast defences of the UK would be manned by the TA alone. In 1932 the Devon Heavy Brigade was amalgamated with the Cornwall Heavy Brigade to form the Devonshire and Cornwall Heavy Brigade, with the following composition:

- 157 (Devon) Battery at Artillery Drill Hall, Lambhay Hill
- 158 Battery at Drill Hall, Plympton
- 164 (Cornwall) Battery moved from Redruth to new Drill Hall, Ker Street, Devonport, opened in 1938.

In 1936, 'Cornwall' was dropped from the title, and when the RA replaced its unit designation of 'brigade' by the more normal 'regiment' in November 1938, the unit became the Devonshire Heavy Regiment, RA. As the TA expanded in the months leading up to the outbreak of World War II, a new 193 Heavy Battery at Falmouth, Cornwall was added to the regiment in August 1939.

== World War II ==
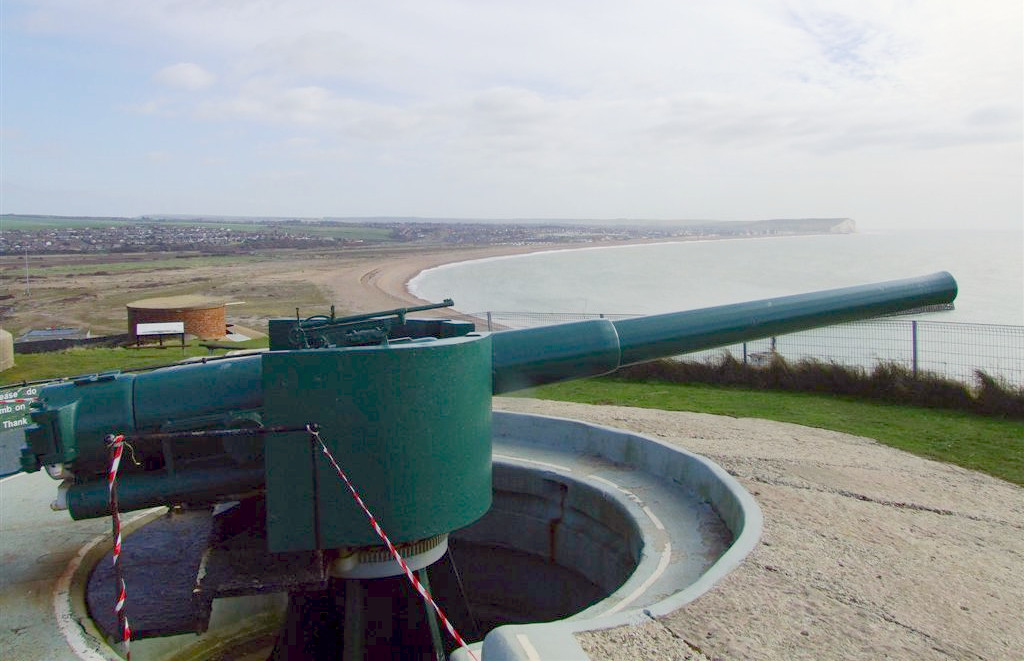
Mk VII 6-inch gun in typical coast defence emplacement, preserved at Newhaven Fort.

=== Mobilisation ===
When war was declared on 3 September 1939, the Devonshire Heavy Rgt was responsible for the following guns:

Plymouth:

- 6 × 9.2-inch
- 4 × 6-inch
- 11 × 12-pdrs

Falmouth:

- 2 × 6-inch

=== Mid-war ===
With the threat of invasion after the Dunkirk evacuation, the coastal artillery defending the United Kingdom was greatly increased. On 14 July 1940, the Cornish element of the regiment regained its independence as the Cornwall Heavy Regiment, later 523rd (Cornwall) Coast Regiment. Then in April 1941, the Devonshire Heavy Regiment was reorganised to form three Coast Regiments, numbered 566–568. All three regiments came under the control of VIII Corps, responsible for the defences of South West England. As radar began to be deployed in coast defences, Coast Observer Detachments (CODs) began to appear, linked to Coastal Artillery Plotting Rooms (later called Army Plotting Rooms), of which No 6 was formed at Plymouth by July 1942 under the commander, Coast Artillery, of VIII Corps.

566 (Devon) Coast Regiment, RA (Note: One normally reliable source, states that 566th (Devon) Coast Rgt spent some time in Iceland before returning to Plymouth. This is an error: an authoritative document shows that this was in fact 536th Coast Rgt.)

- Regimental Headquarters (RHQ) at Drake's Island in Drake Fire Command by 7 December 1942
- 159 Bty – 6-inch guns at Drake's Island
- 160 Bty – 12-pdrs at Drake's Island; moved to Mount Batten, Plymouth Sound, by 10 April 1942
- 161 Bty – Western Kings
- 195 Bty – independent battery from Humber defences joined 10 April 1942
- 196 Bty – independent battery from Forth defences joined 10 April 1942
- 3 COD – from 552nd Coast Rgt by December 1942

567 (Devon) Coast Regiment, RA

- RHQ at Rame in Rame Fire Command by 7 December 1942
- 162 Bty – 6-inch guns at Picklecombe
- 163 Bty – 12-pdrs at Picklecombe
- 164 Bty – at Penlee
- 84 COD – formed by April 1942
- 104 COD – formed by October 1942

568 (Devon) Coast Regiment, RA

- RHQ at Wembury in Wembury Fire Command by 7 December 1942
- 156 Bty – Renny
- 157 Bty – Watch House
- 158 Bty – Bovisand; to Houton, Orkneys, to join 534th (Orkney) Coast Rgt 8 June 1941
- 137 Bty – joined 26 May 1941 from 533rd (Orkney) Coast Rgt
- 174 Bty – joined 8 September 1942 from 564th Coast Rgt; regimented with 565th Coast Rgt 1 November 1942
- 185 Bty – attached 8 September 1942 from 536th Coast Rgt; regimented with 523rd (Cornwall) Coast Rgt 12 October 1942
- 107 COD – Formed by December 1942

=== Later War ===
As the threat from German attack diminished after 1942 there was demand for trained gunners for the fighting fronts. A process of reducing the manpower in the coast defences began. In 568th (Devon) Coast Rgt, 157 Bty was disbanded on 15 March 1943, 107 COD was disbanded by 13 April, 137 and 156 Btys were transferred to 566th (Devon) Coast Rgt on 19 April, and finally RHQ 568th was placed in suspended animation on 9 May. Meanwhile, 160 Bty of 566th was transferred to Newhaven, East Sussex, under 521st (Kent and Sussex) Coast Rgt on 1 May and was replaced at Mount Batten by a newly formed 443 Bty. By July 1943 the two remaining regiments had seen their CODs posted away. When VIII Corps was assigned to 21st Army Group in early 1943 for the forthcoming Allied invasion of Normandy (Operation Overlord), the Plymouth defences came under 'South Western District Coast Artillery' in Southern Command.

The manpower requirements for Overlord led to further reductions in coast defences in April 1944. By this stage of the war, many of the coast battery positions were manned by Home Guard detachments or were in the hands of care and maintenance parties. 567th (Devon) Coast Rgt passed into suspended animation on 1 April 1944 and 162, 163 and 164 Btys also joined 566th.

When the war in Europe ended, this process was accelerated. 566th Coast Regiment was redesignated 566th (Devon and Cornwall) Coast Regiment once more on 1 June 1945, when 159 and 161 Btys (TA) passed into suspended animation and the war-formed batteries (196 and 443) were disbanded. RHQ and the remaining batteries (137, 56, 162, 163, 164 and 195) went into suspended animation on 10 January 1946, and the regiment had dispersed by the end of the month.

== Postwar ==
When the TA was reconstituted on 1 January 1947, the 566th and 567th Regiments were reformed as 407th/408th (Devon) Coast Regiment, separating into two regiments the following year; 568th was not reformed. Both 407th and 408th were part of the 102nd Coast Artillery Brigade. However, it was soon afterwards decided to reduce the number of TA coast regiments, and on 1 September 1948 the 408th was redesignated 408th (Devon) Heavy Anti-Aircraft Regiment, Royal Artillery, but was placed in suspended animation on 1 May 1949 and subsequently disbanded. (Note: The later 408 (Glamorganshire and Pembroke) Coast Rgt formed in 1953 had no connection with the earlier Devon units.)

407th (Devon) Coast Regiment continued at Plymouth until 31 October 1956, when the Coast Artillery Branch of the RA was disbanded. The regiment was absorbed by 256th (Wessex) Light Anti-Aircraft Regiment, RA (which had originally been the 1st Admin Brigade of Devonshire Artillery Volunteers, see above).

== Honorary colonels ==
The following officers served as Honorary Colonel of the regiment:

- Lt-Col Alex Ridgway, former commanding officer, appointed 15 August 1883.
- Sir William Pearce, 2nd Baronet, appointed 10 June 1893.
- Lt-Col E.B. Jeune, former commanding officer, appointed 1 April 1913.
- Brig-Gen John, 2nd Lord St Levan, CB, CVO, appointed (to Cornwall RGA) 5 July 1913
- Waldorf, 2nd Viscount Astor, appointed (to Devonshire Heavy Bde) 5 April 1929

(Lords St Levan and Astor served as joint Honorary Colonels after their regiments were merged.)

== Memorial ==
There is a memorial tablet on a wall in Newton Ferrers to the men of the Devonshire RGA who died during World War I.
