= Whitworth Porter =

English major-general

Major-General Whitworth Porter
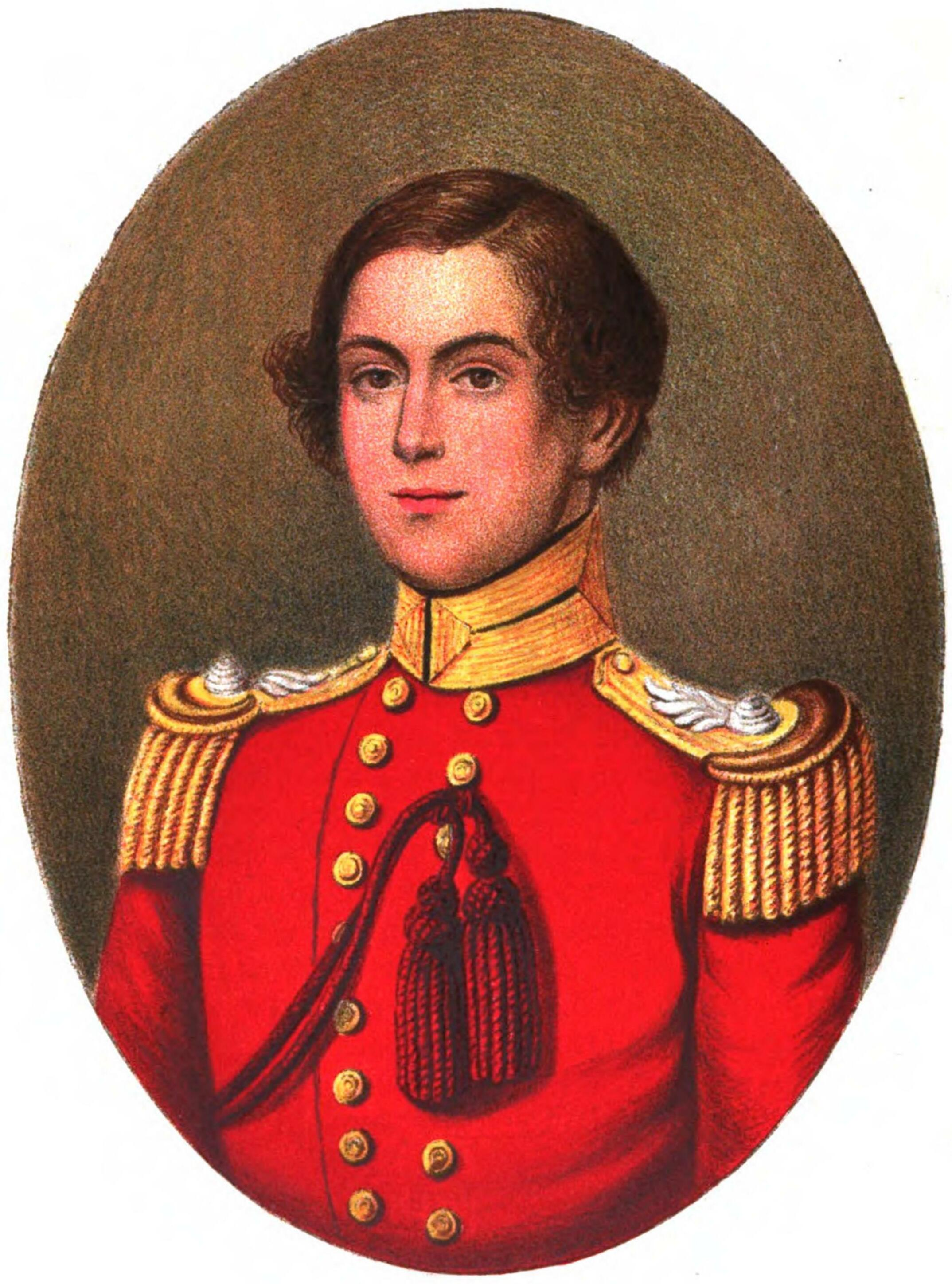
- Portrait of Porter, 1846
- Born: 25 September 1827
- Died: 27 May 1892 (aged 64)
- Military career
- Allegiance: United Kingdom
- Branch: British Army
- Service years: 1845–1881
- Rank: Major-General
- Conflicts: Crimean War; Siege of Sebastopol
- Awards: Order of Medjidie

Major-General Whitworth Porter (1827–1892) was a British Army officer in the Royal Engineers, known also as a historical writer.

== Life ==
The second son of Henry Porter, of Winslade House, South Devon, he was born at Winslade, near Exeter, on 25 September 1827; his mother was Rose Aylmer, youngest daughter of Sir Henry Russell, 1st Baronet. Porter entered the Royal Military Academy at Woolwich on 14 November 1842, obtained a commission as second lieutenant in the Royal Engineers on 18 December 1845, and was promoted first lieutenant on 1 April 1846.

After passing through the usual course of professional instruction at Chatham, Porter embarked for Dominica in the West Indies on 13 December 1847, having married the preceding October. He returned home from Dominica in March 1850, and was stationed at Limerick. He was promoted second captain on 3 January 1855. On 20 December 1853 he embarked for Malta, but in February 1855 was sent on active service to the Crimean War. He served in the trenches at the siege of Sebastopol until June. For his services he received the war medal, with clasp for Sebastopol, the Turkish medal, and the fifth class of the Order of Medjidie; and on 2 November 1855 he was promoted brevet-major. After serving at home for 18 months, he returned to Malta in December 1856. On 2 April 1859 Porter was promoted first captain in the Royal Engineers, and returned to England.

Porter was employed at the War Office under the inspector-general of fortifications from April 1859 until September 1862 in connection with the defence of the United Kingdom. he was the designer of Picklecombe Fort, as part of the defences of Devonport Dockyard. He served on the jury for the military division of the 1862 International Exhibition in London, was instructor in fortification at the Royal Military College at Sandhurst from 1862 to 1868, was promoted brevet lieutenant-colonel on 23 August 1866, and promoted regimental lieutenant-colonel on 14 December 1868.

In March 1870 Porter was again sent to Malta, where, as executive officer under the commanding Royal Engineer, he supervised the construction of the defences of the new dockyard. While at Malta he was employed on the eclipse expedition to Sicily in 1872, and he designed and erected observatories at Catania and Syracuse. He was promoted brevet-colonel on 14 December 1873.

In February 1874 Porter was appointed commanding Royal Engineer at Barbados; he remained there for two years, returning to England in April 1876, and was stationed for a time at Chatham. He was commanding Royal Engineer of the western district, and stationed at Plymouth from 1877 till 1 October 1881, when he retired from the service on a pension, with the honorary rank of major-general. After retirement he interested himself in charitable works connected with the Order of St. John of Jerusalem, and was chairman of the metropolitan district of the St. John's Ambulance Association.

Porter died on 27 May 1892, and was buried at St. Michael's Church, York Town, now in Camberley, Surrey, of which he had been churchwarden for many years. He had contributed towards its enlargement, and had carved the ornamental foliage on the chancel screen.

== Works ==
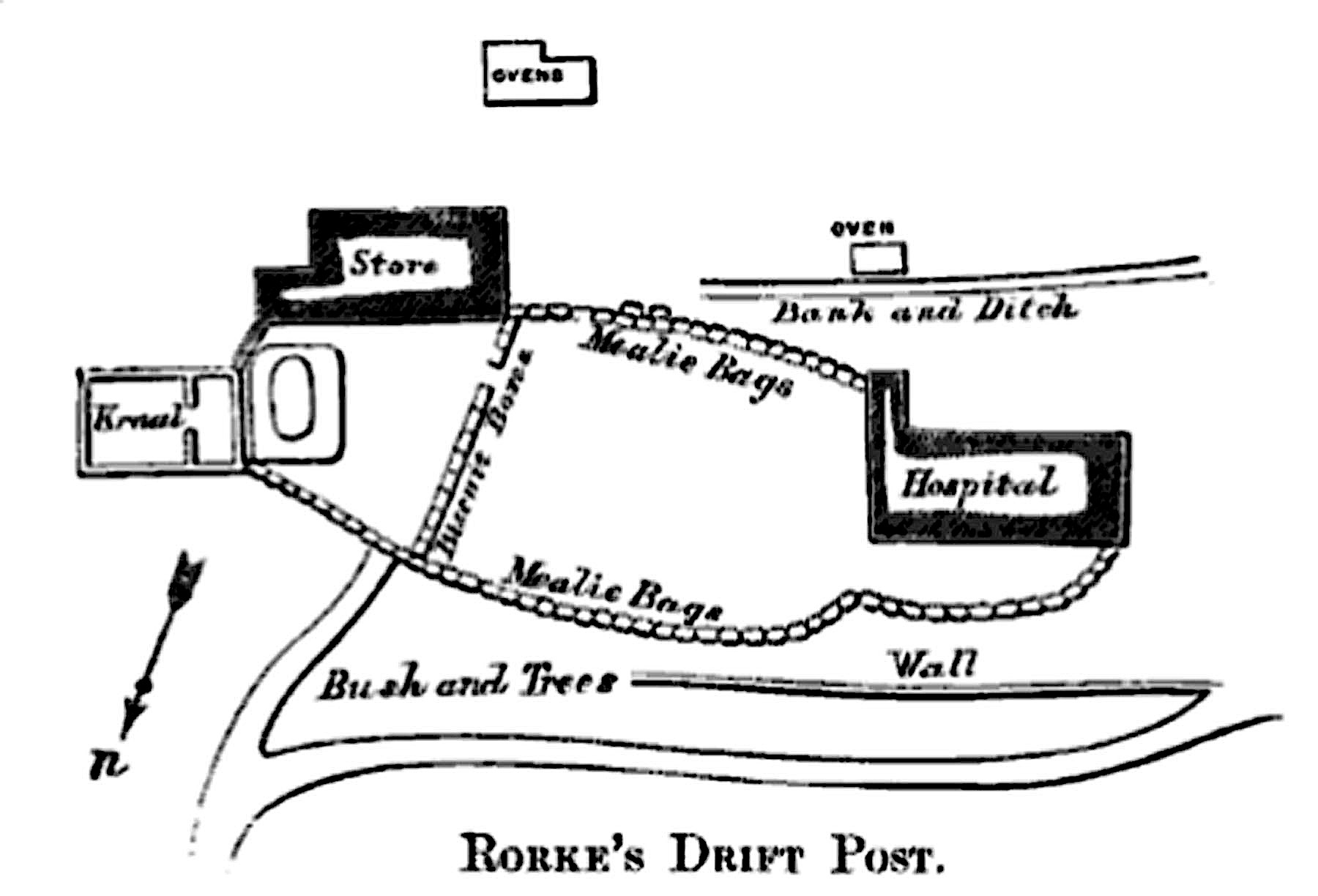
Rorke's Drift Post, in History of the Corps of Royal Engineers, vol. II

Porter published Life in the Trenches before Sebastopol, London, 1856. It was followed by A History of the Knights of Malta (2 vols. London, 1858); which he revised for an edition in 1883, and also abridged. His major work of later life was History of the Corps of Royal Engineers, which was published in two volumes in 1889. One of his last acts was to present the copyright of the work to the Corps. A continuation was added, through 11 volumes.

== Family ==
Porter married in London, on 25 October 1847, Annie Shirley da Costa, by whom he had two children:

1. Catherine, who married Captain Crosse; and
2. Reginald da Costa, a lieutenant in the Royal Engineers who died in accident in 1882.

Porter erected a reredos at St. Michael's Church, York Town, to the memory of Reginald.
