= Maker Battery =

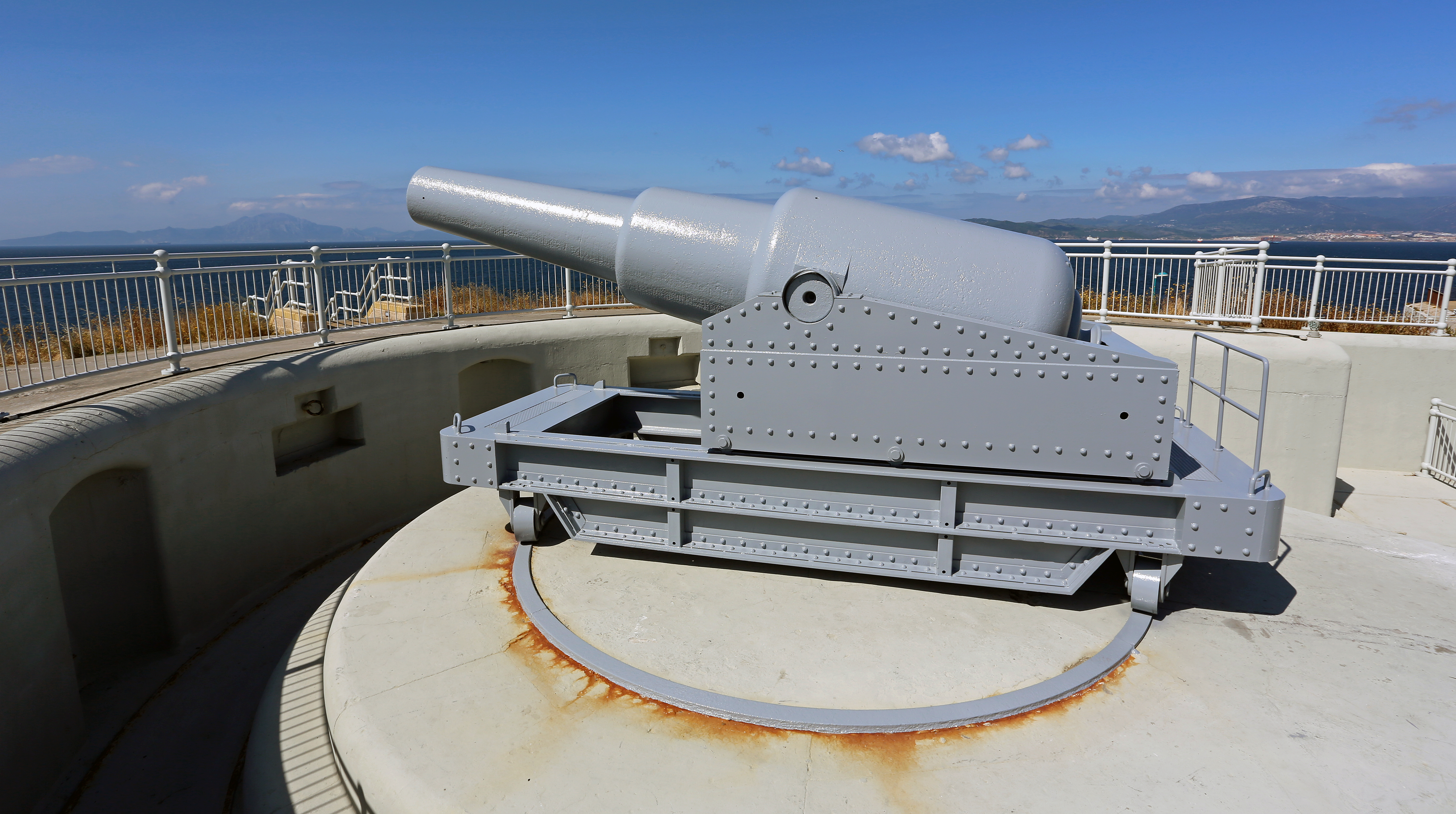
- The battery was originally designed for a single, later three 12.5-inch Rifled Muzzle Loading (RML) guns

Site information
- Owner: Privately owned
- Open to the public: No
- Condition: Derelict, complete

Location
- Coordinates: 50.3386°N 4.1974°W

Site history
- Built: 1885-1887
- In use: Disused
- Materials: Earth; Concrete

Maker Battery is a former 19th-century coastal artillery battery, built to strengthen the defence of the Royal Naval Dockyard at Devonport.

The battery was proposed in 1885 on the recommendations of the Stanhope Committee report and completed in 1887. It was built with emplacements for a single 12.5-inch Rifled Muzzle Loading (RML) gun which was mounted. It was then supplemented in 1890 when two further 12.5-inch guns were moved from nearby Grenville Battery.

The gun positions were served by underground magazines. The rear of the battery is enclosed by a small ditch and drawbridge. There was no barrack accommodation at the battery, but a small cookhouse was built to cater for the men expected to man the battery.

The battery was upgraded with newer armament in 1899 when the battery was re-modelled for two 6-inch breech loading (BL) guns which were installed by 1903. These remained in place until 1911 when they were dismounted. The battery was abandoned by the War Office in 1948.

The battery remains complete but derelict today.

== Bibliography ==
- Hogg, Ian V (1974). Coast Defences of England and Wales 1856–1956. David & Charles. ISBN 0-7153 6353-0.
- Woodward, Freddy (1996). The Historic Defences of Plymouth. Cornwall County Council. ISBN 978-1898166467.
