= Lentney Battery =

Coordinates: 50°19′30″N 4°7′6″W

- Devon; England
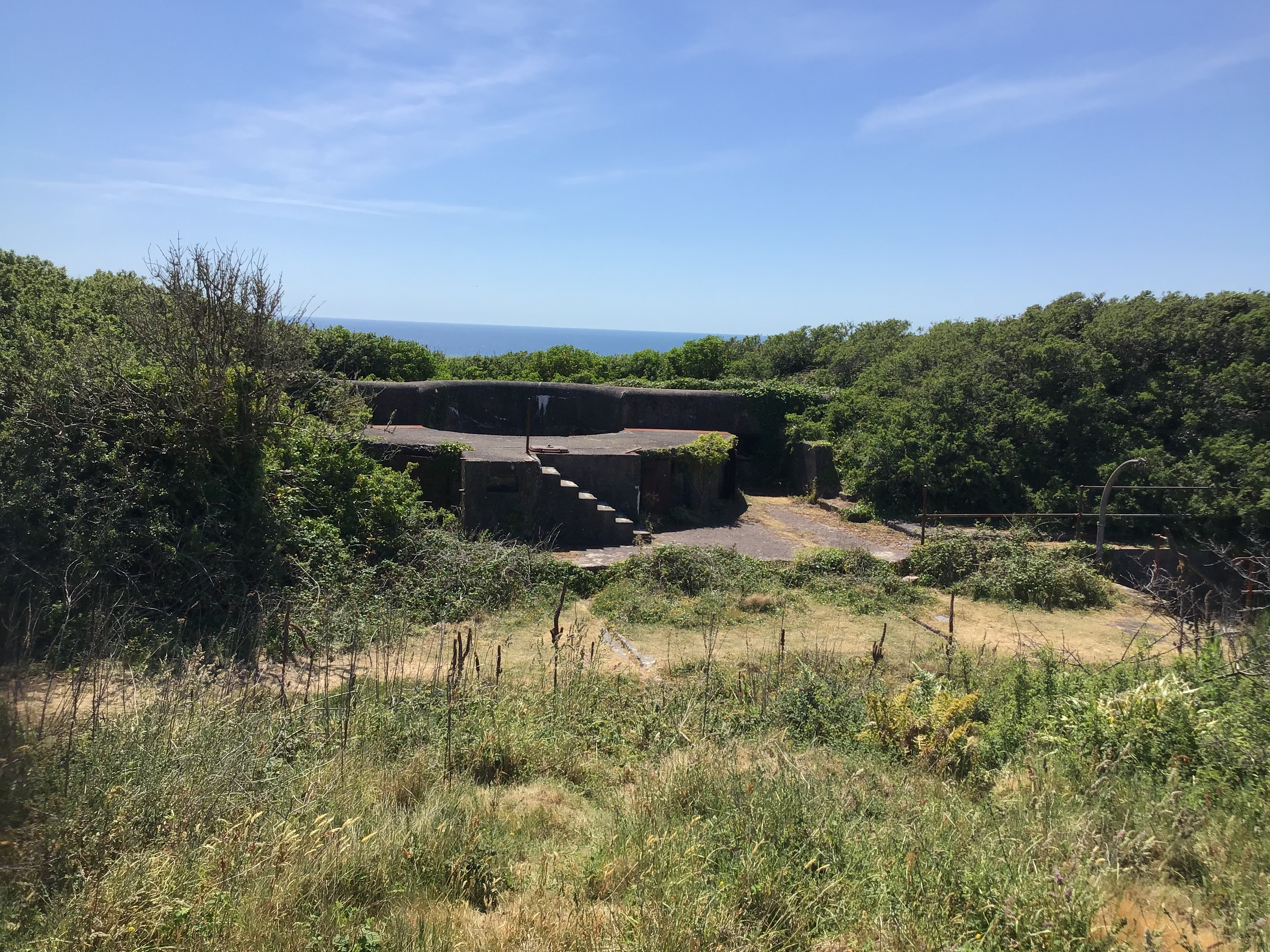
- Gun position for 6-inch Breech Loading (BL) gun at Lentney Battery, 2020

Site information
- Open to the public: Yes
- Condition: Complete; disarmed

Location

Site history
- Built: 1905
- Materials: Earth; Concrete

Lentney Battery is a former 20th-century gun battery, built in 1905 as one of three 6-inch gun batteries to defend the Eastern approaches to Plymouth Sound, for the defence of the Royal Naval Dockyard at Devonport. It shared accommodation with the nearby Renney Battery.

It was armed with two 6-inch Mark VII breechloading naval guns In 1914 a blockhouse and unclimbable fence was added. The battery was manned by the Devonshire royal Garrison Artillery. In 1930 the battery was disarmed, but later re-armed during the Second World War.

After the Second World War the battery was used as one of the practice batteries for the Coast Artillery Training School. On the dissolution of coast artillery in the United Kingdom in 1956 the battery was disarmed. It was used for military and adventure training by the Junior Leaders Regiment, Royal Armoured Corps until released by the military in 1991, and became Grade II listed the following year.

== Bibliography ==
- Hogg, Ian V (1974). Coast Defences of England and Wales 1856-1956. David & Charles. ISBN 0-7153 6353-0.
- Woodward, Freddy (1996). The Historic Defences of Plymouth. Cornwall County Council. ISBN 978-1898166467.

== External sources ==
- Victorian Forts data sheet on Lentney Battery
