= Picklecombe Fort =

Coordinates: 50°20′37″N 4°10′20″W

- Cornwall; England
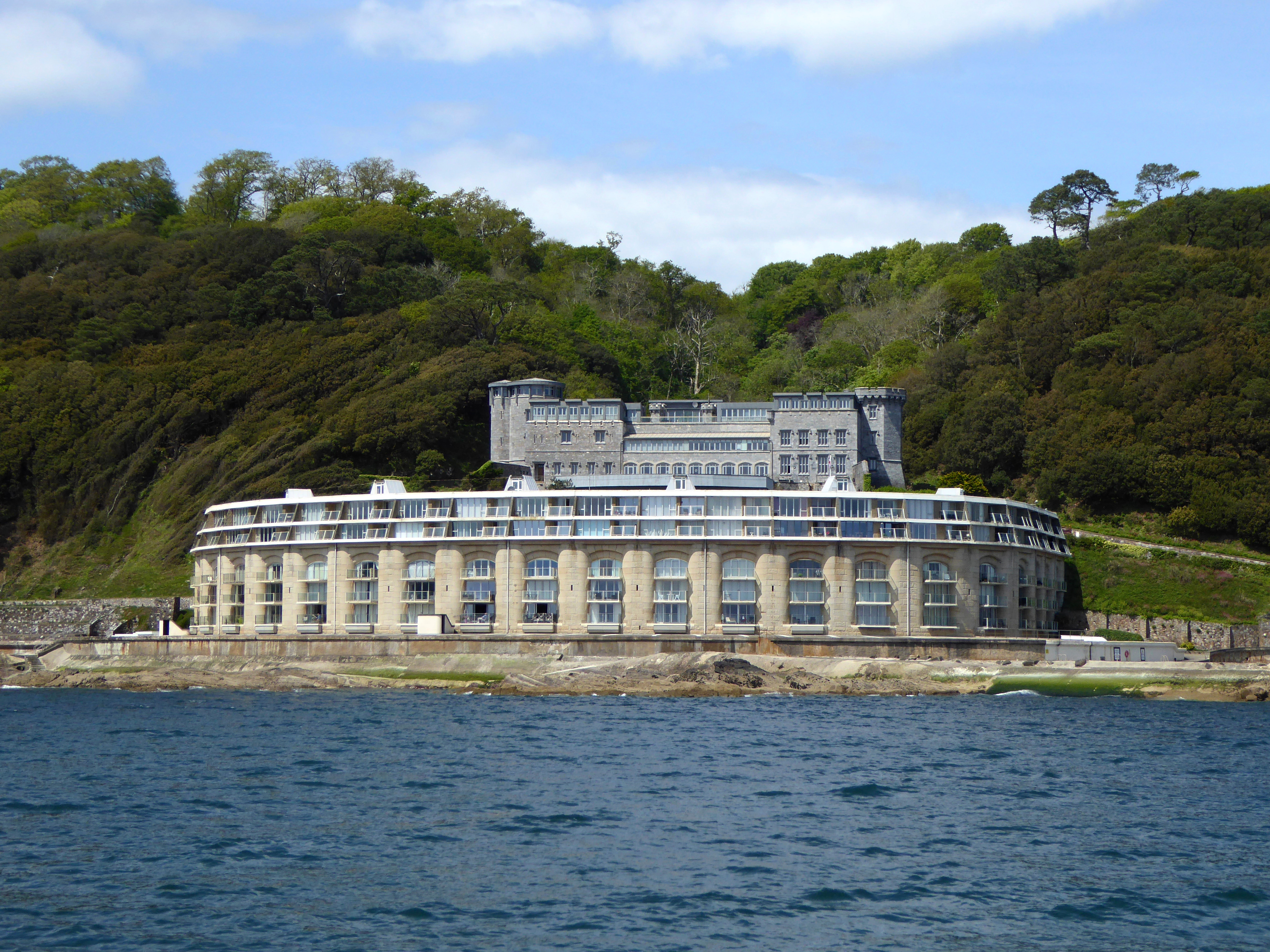
- Picklecombe Fort from Plymouth Sound

Site information
- Owner: Private
- Open to the public: No
- Condition: Complete

Location

Site history
- Built: 1864-1871
- Materials: Masonry; Iron

Listed Building – Grade II
- Official name: Picklecombe Fort
- Designated: 26 January 1987
- Reference no.: 1160211

Fort Picklecombe stands on the extreme south eastern coast of Cornwall, a couple of miles south of the city of Plymouth. The fort has been a residential complex since the early 1970s but has a history dating back 150 years.

== Founding ==
Fort Picklecombe was commissioned in the mid-19th century by Lord Palmerston, Foreign Secretary and then Prime Minister under Queen Victoria.

Great Britain was at risk from invasion by sea, particularly from France. Palmerston ordered a series of coastal forts and batteries to be built to defend the large naval base at Devonport in Plymouth. The coastal entrance to Plymouth is known as Plymouth Sound, and was to be defended by Fort Picklecombe to the west, Fort Bovisand to the east, and a smaller fort on the Plymouth Sound breakwater. Fort Picklecombe itself would be defended from attack from the rear by a series of smaller forts and batteries positioned on or near the Rame peninsula.

Fort Picklecombe was built near an earlier earthen battery dating back to the start of the 19th century. It was designed by Major (later Maj Gen) Whitworth Porter , and was built by Hubbard and Company. Constructed between 1864 and 1871, the fort was armed with forty two 9-inch and 10-inch muzzle loading guns, which were mounted in a semi-circular arc of two-storey casemates faced with granite blocks and iron shields. In the 1890s, it was rearmed with two 6-inch breech-loaders and two light quick firing guns. Not a single shot has ever been fired in anger from the fort. The Palmerston forts’ lack of war action led them to be dubbed Palmerston Follies, the fact that they were a deterrent was lost on their critics.

== 20th century ==
Guns were removed from the fort in the 1920s but after the outbreak of the World War II it was reactivated and manned by the 566th Devon Coast Regiment, Royal Artillery. In addition to the two 6-inch guns, two twin 6-pounder guns were installed. Just down the coast to the west of the fort range finder and searchlight positions were made. The remains of these positions remain today.

After the war, the fort was decommissioned and it stood derelict for many years. Eventually it was sold to property developers and in the early 1970s it was converted to 103 residential apartments. The conversion took the form of 3 floors of apartments in the existing structure and the addition of 2 new floors on the top. The fort's position overlooking Plymouth Sound and within the beautiful Mount Edgcumbe Country Park make it highly desirable. It is a quiet rural retreat yet is only a couple of miles as the crow flies from the urban sprawl of Plymouth, although at least 10 miles by road.

A grand building called the Officers' Mess stands in an elevated position above the main fort. It is said that in order to meet the demands of the then landowner, the Earl of Edgcumbe, this mess had to emulate Warwick Castle, complete with towers and castellations. In the Spring of 2007 work was well under way to convert the Officers Mess into flats.

== Bibliography ==
- Hogg, Ian V (1974). Coast Defences of England and Wales 1856-1956. David & Charles. ISBN 0-7153 6353-0.
- Woodward, Freddy (1996). The Historic Defences of Plymouth. Cornwall County Council. ISBN 978-1898166467.
