= Western King's Redoubt =

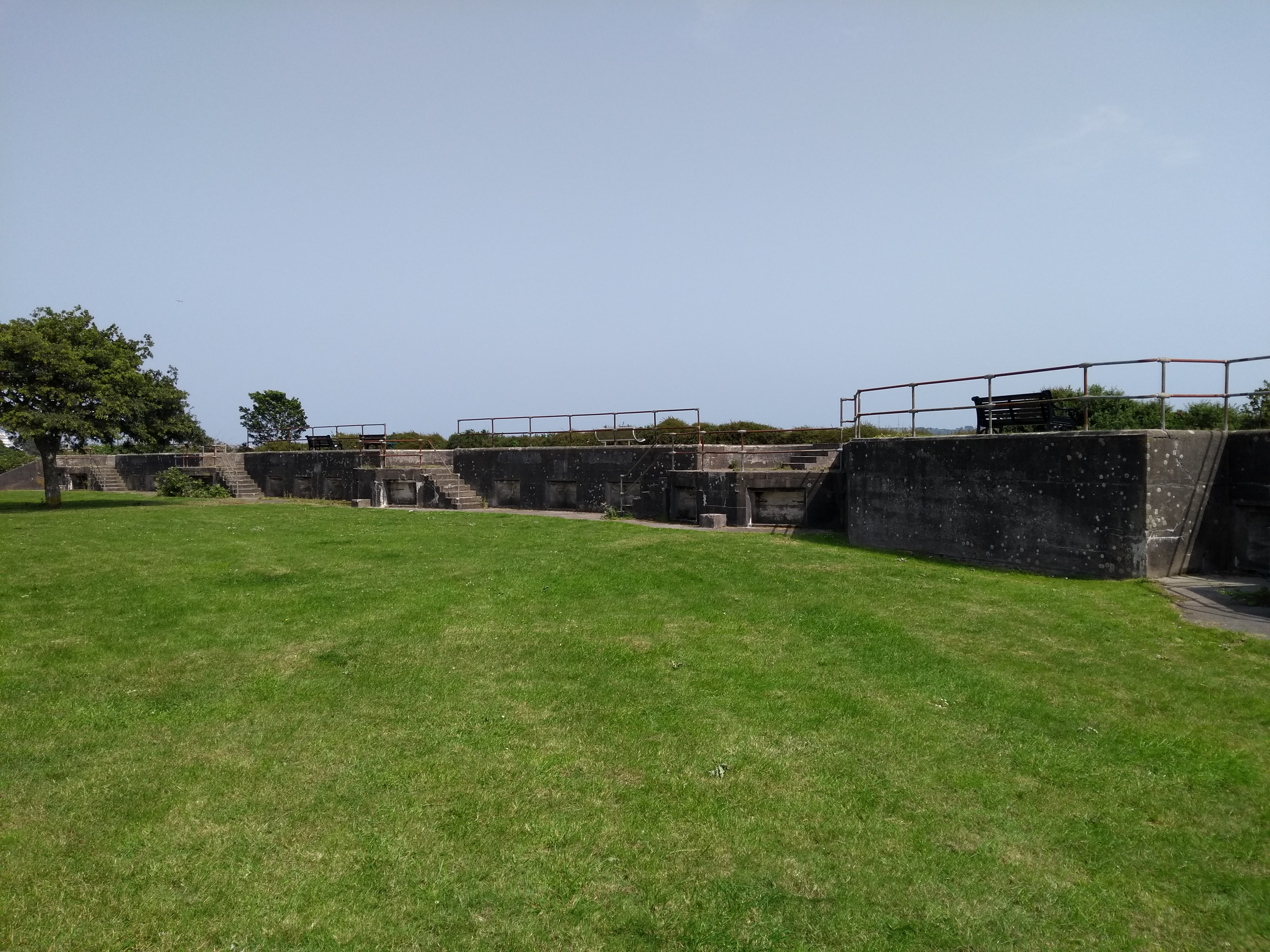
- 12 Pounder Quick Firing (QF) gun positions at Western King's Redoubt, 2019

Site information
- Type: Battery
- Open to the public: Yes
- Condition: Mostly complete

Location
- Coordinates: 50.3598°N 4.1646°W

Site history
- Built: 1861-1862
- Materials: Earth concrete

The Western King's Redoubt is an 18th and 19th-century artillery battery in Plymouth, Devonshire, England, upgraded as a result of the Royal Commission on the Defence of the United Kingdom of 1859. Part of an extensive scheme known as Palmerston Forts, after the prime minister who championed the scheme, it was built to defend the seaward approaches to the Hamoaze, as an element of the plan for the defence of the Royal Naval Dockyard at Devonport.

In 1779, a pair of small forts or redoubts were constructed overlooking Firestone Bay in Plymouth Sound, known as Western and Eastern King's Redoubts. The western redoubt mounted twelve 18-pounder cannons. In 1861, a battery was built to mount nine guns, with a further seven guns in the older redoubt to the rear of the battery. By 1893 it mounted nine 64 Pounder Rifled Muzzle Loading Guns.

By 1897 the battery was remodelled and a battery for seven 12 Pounder Quick Firing (QF) guns was built over the west flank and redoubt. By 1918 only four of these guns remained.

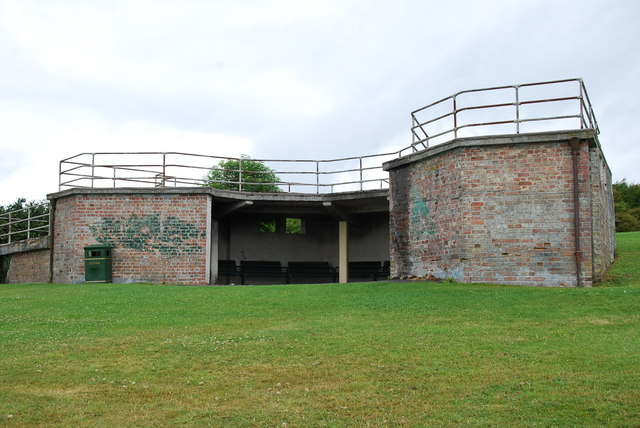
Covered position for one of the two twin 6 Pounder guns

In 1941 two positions were created for twin 6 pounder Quick Firing guns to provide rapid firing capability against enemy Motor Torpedo Boats (MTBs). These positions remained armed until the dissolution of coast artillery in 1956 when they were removed.

Today the site is open and can be explored. The 12 Pounder Quick Firing gun positions survive intact and the positions for the twin 6 Pounder guns have been partly filled in but retain their overhead cover, designed as protection against air attack.

== Bibliography ==
- Hogg, Ian V (1974). Coast Defences of England and Wales 1856-1956. David & Charles. ISBN 0-7153 6353-0.
- Woodward, Freddy (1996). The Historic Defences of Plymouth. Cornwall County Council. ISBN 978-1898166467.
