= Grenville Battery =

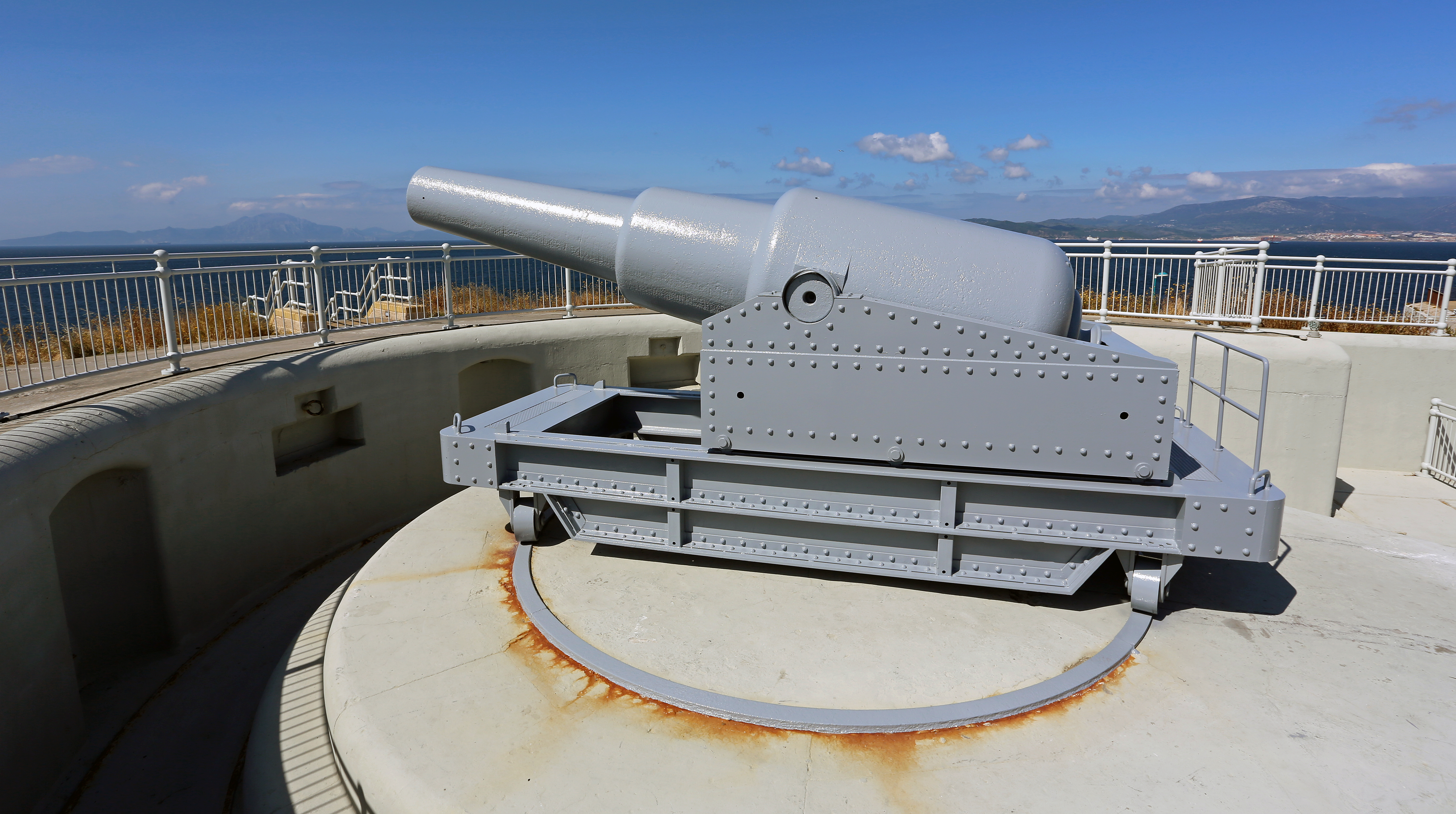
- The battery was remodelled for two 12.5-inch Rifled Muzzle Loading (RML) guns in 1887

Site information
- Owner: Privately owned
- Open to the public: No
- Condition: Derelict, complete

Location
- Coordinates: 50.3393°N 4.1957°W

Site history
- Built: 1885-1887
- In use: Disused
- Materials: Masonry; Concrete

Grenville Battery is a former coastal artillery battery, built to defend the Royal Naval Dockyard at Devonport.

The battery was originally built between 1760 and 1791 as part of the Maker Redoubt line and then named 'Maker No 4 (North Gloucester) Redoubt', it was intended to form part of a long defensive line of bastions to a larger fort which was never built. The battery had 15 gun embrasures. It was disarmed in 1815.

The re-modelling of the battery was proposed in 1885 on the recommendations of the Stanhope Committee report and completed in 1887. It was renamed Grenville Battery in 1899. It was built with emplacements for two 12.5-inch Rifled Muzzle Loading (RML) guns which were both mounted. However, in 1890 they were moved to nearby Maker Battery.

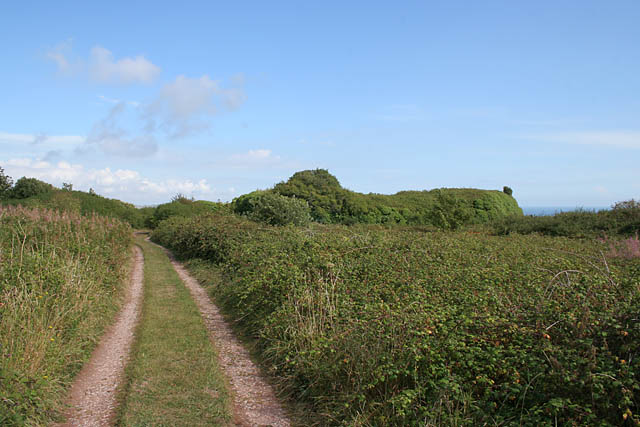
Grenville Battery in 2006 when overgrown

The gun positions were served by underground magazines. The rear of the battery is enclosed by a loopholed wall, small ditch and drawbridge. There was no barrack accommodation at the battery, but a small cookhouse was built to cater for the men expected to man the battery and nearby Maker Battery.

The battery was upgraded with newer armament in 1899 when the battery was re-modelled for three 4.7-inch Quick Firing (QF) guns which were installed by 1901. These remained in place until 1927 when they were dismounted. The battery was abandoned by the War Office in 1948.

The battery remains complete and was Grade II listed in 1972.

It was overgrown for many years, but in 2020 the battery was cleared of undergrowth and accumulated rubbish by the Rame Conservation Trust, with financial support from Historic England.

== Bibliography ==
- Hogg, Ian V (1974). Coast Defences of England and Wales 1856–1956. David & Charles. ISBN 0-7153 6353-0.
- Woodward, Freddy (1996). The Historic Defences of Plymouth. Cornwall County Council. ISBN 978-1898166467.
