= Fort de Bourlémont =

- Part of Séré de Rivières system
- Surgy
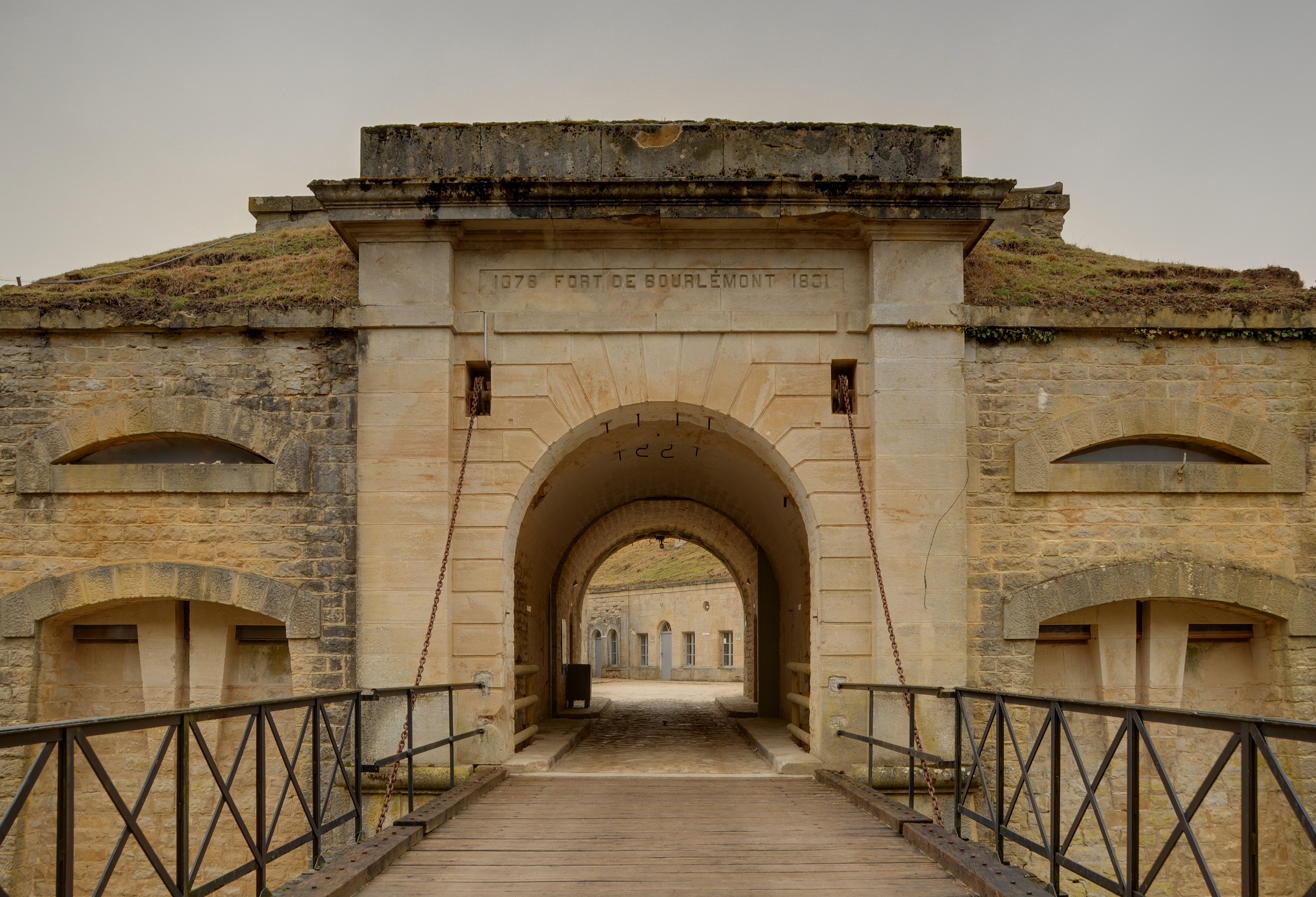

Site information
- Type: Fort
- Controlled by: France
- Open to the public: Yes
- Condition: Preserved

Location
- Coordinates: 48.363848°N 5.644183°E

Site history
- Built: 1878
- Materials: Brick, stone

The Fort de Bourlémont, or Fort Choiseul, was built between 1878 and 1881. The fort was built as part of the Séré de Rivières system of fortifications, which were conceived in response to the increasing power and range of artillery. The Fort de Bourlémont was part of the defenses of the Charmes Gap (Trouée de Charmes), in the town of Mont-lès-Neufchâteau, 3 kilometres (1.9 mi) west of Neufchâteau.

== Description ==
The diamond-shaped fort was entered over a drawbridge through an off-center gate complex, directly adjacent to one of the caponiers that defend the fort's ditch. The for has a double caponier at the diamond's apex, with single caponiers, including the entrance caponier, and opposite corners. The artillery batteries are disposed in a rough circle surrounding the central barracks. The firing positions are shielded by earth mounds, while the entire surface of the fort incorporates earth protection against shellfire. The fort is unique in possessing, from its construction, a dedicated infirmary. Built of earth-shielded masonry, the fort could resist attacks by black powder-filled artillery shells. With the development of high explosive-filled shells, the so-called crise des obus torpilles ("crisis of the torpedo [explosive] shells"), the fort was obsolete without further reinforcement with concrete. The Fort de Bourlémont never received such an upgrade.

The fort, planned to play a major role in the defense of the area is a fort d'arrêt ("stop point" or "stopping fort") designed to close the Charmes Gap between the defensive curtains of Epinal-Belfort and Toul-Verdun. Its artillery fire was planned to cover:

- The retreat of French field formations in case they were compelled to evacuate the wooded hills of Mirecourt
- The transportation hub of Neufchâteau, a location of exceptional importance with four train lines and five main roads
- The valley of the Saônelle
- The Midrevaux valley

The fort was also planned to interdict enemy troops seeking to gain access to the Paris basin. The fort was designed to operate for three months with complete autonomy. Artillery faces in all directions. There is no lightly defended "rear" to the fort. The barracks are placed in sunken "streets" in the center, which, while effective against the artillery of the time, was insufficient for protection against high-explosive shells.

As a fort d'arrêt, the fort's role was to provide a strategic rallying point where an invading enemy, funneled by the Epinal-Belfort and Toul-Verdun defensive curtains, could be decisively engaged and defeated by a field army on prepared terrain of France's choosing.

The fort covers 3.6 hectares (8.9 acres), 4.5 hectares (11 acres) including the ditches. The fort includes 84 rooms and shelters in 91 locations. The fort was planned for:

- 732 men, with 690 enlisted men, 33 non-commissioned officers and 9 officers
- Five horses
- A nominal armament upon completion of 18 artillery pieces on the rampart of 120mm and 155mm caliber
- 8 defensive artillery pieces
- 11 mortars
- 150000 kg of black powder in cartridges and 985,000 balls or shells

== History ==
The preferred site was chosen in 1877 by a committee that included General Raymond Adolphe Séré de Rivières, and was expropriated from landowners that included the Prince Hénin. Construction began in 1878, with an approximate budget of 2 million francs-d'or. Construction was by Petit et Marey of Neufchâteau. Stone was quarried locally at Fréville and Rapailles, conveyed to the construction site by a railway line whose vestiges remain visible. An 1880 project to install a Mougin casemate never came to fruition. The fort was away from the fighting during the First World War. During the Second World War the Germans used the fort as a depot. An explosion caused numerous German casualties. The Germans stripped the fort of armament and metals between 1941 and 1944.

- From 1881 to 1914 : Installation of a reduced garrison at the fort as a detachment of the 79th Artillery Regiment, armament of the fort.
- From 1914 to 1918 : Re-armament of the fort as a result of World War I.
- From 1918 : Occupied by American troops, the fort became a detention site for German and Alsatian prisoners of war.
- From 1918 to 1939 : The fort became a munitions depot with a small garrison.
- From 1940 : The fort is occupied by German troops who use it as a munitions and materièl depot.
- From 1945 to 1950 : A small guard post is set up in the former officer's quarters outside the fort.
- From 1950 to 1996 : The fort is abandoned, but the surrounding lands remain military territory. Troops use the fort several times a year for exercises.

In 1996 Mont-lès-Neufchâteau bought the fort. The fort has been managed by the Association des Amis du Fort de Bourlémont (AAFB) since 1997, which provides tours of the site. The site has been cleared, with the fort largely intact, although missing a portion of a wall and a caponier.
