= Coffer (disambiguation) =

A coffer, in architecture, is a sunken panel in a ceiling, soffit or vault.

Coffer may also refer to:

- Coffer (fortification), a hollow lodgement against a dry moat
- Coffer (furniture) or chest, a lockable box for storing valuable items
- Cofferdam, a temporary enclosure used during dam construction
- Safe, also called a coffer, a secure lockable box used for securing valuable objects against theft

== See also ==
- Cofer (disambiguation)
