= Cofer =

Cofer may refer to:

- 23788 Cofer, a main-belt asteroid, named after DCYSC awardee Evan Mitchell Cofer
- USS Cofer (DE-208), a U.S. Navy warship, named after John Joseph Cofer
- COFER: Currency Composition of Foreign Exchange Reserves
- Cofer, a taxonomic synonym of the plant genus Symplocos

== People ==
- Doyle Cofer (1923–1999), an American professional basketball player
- James Erwin Cofer (born 1949), a former president of Missouri State University and University of Louisiana
- Joseph Cofer Black (born 1950) a former CIA official
- Joe Cofer (born 1963), an American football player
- Judith Ortiz Cofer (1952–2016), a Puerto Rican American author
- Kermit R. Cofer (1908–1989), associate justice of the Supreme Court of Mississippi
- Lanell Cofer (1948–2018), American politician from Texas
- Phil Cofer (born 1996), American basketball player

== See also ==
- Coffer (disambiguation)
- Mike Cofer (disambiguation)
