= Mont-lès-Neufchâteau =

- Commune
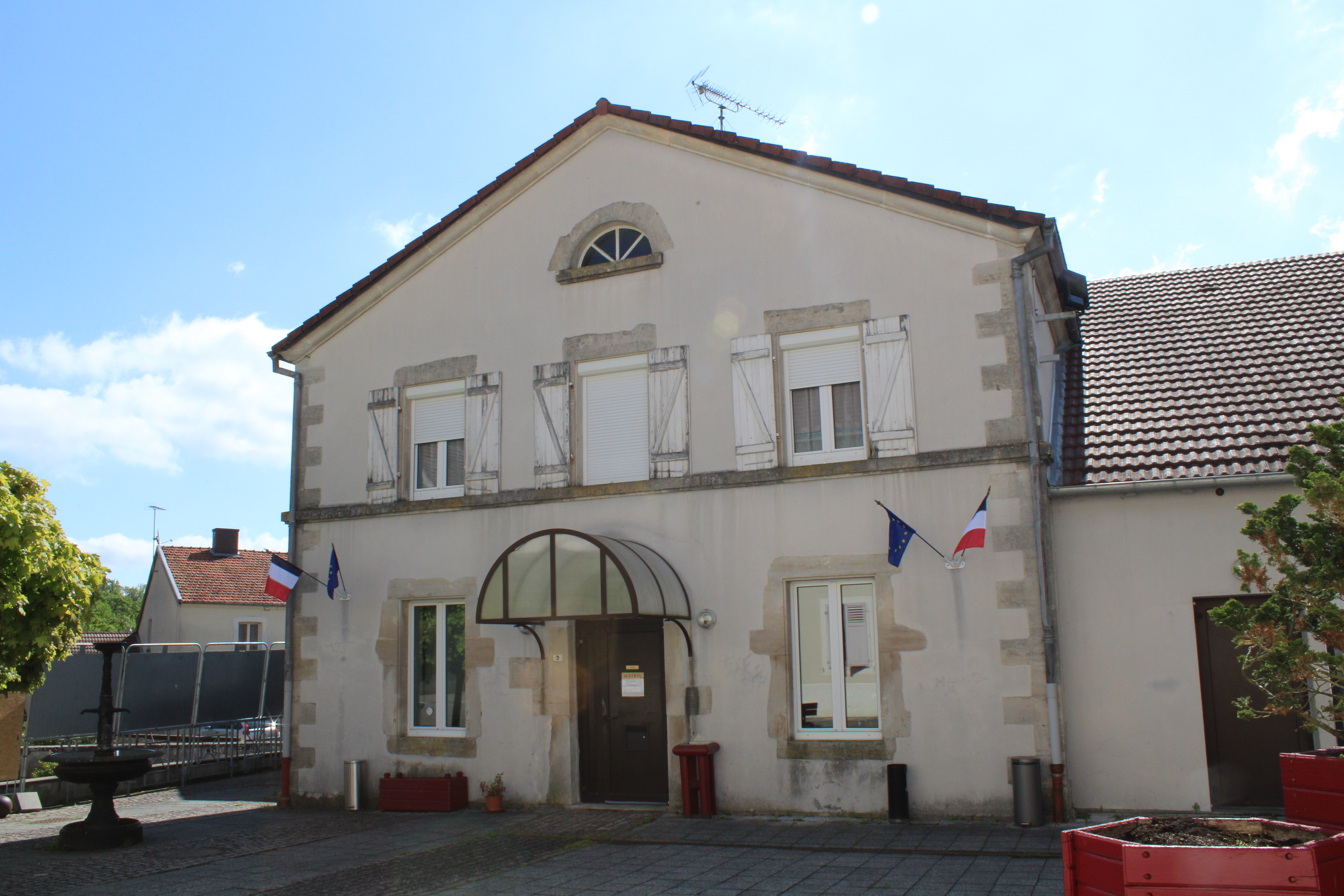
- The town hall in Mont-lès-Neufchâteau

- Coat of arms
- Location of Mont-lès-Neufchâteau
- Location within France Location within Grand Est
- Coordinates: 48°21′25″N 5°38′32″E
- Country: France
- Region: Grand Est
- Department: Vosges
- Arrondissement: Neufchâteau
- Canton: Neufchâteau
- Intercommunality: CC Ouest Vosgien

Government
  - Mayor (2023–2026): Marcial Torraille
- Area^{1}: 11.51 km^{2} (4.44 sq mi)
- Elevation: 335 m (1,099 ft)
- Highest elevation: 451 m (1,480 ft)
- Lowest elevation: 282 m (925 ft)
- Population (2023): 267
  - Density: 23.2/km^{2} (60.1/sq mi)
- Time zone: UTC+01:00 (CET)
  - Summer (DST): UTC+02:00 (CEST)
- INSEE/Postal code: 88308 /88300
- ^{1} French Land Register data, which excludes lakes, ponds, glaciers > 1 km^{2} (0.386 sq mi or 247 acres) and river estuaries.

Mont-lès-Neufchâteau (French pronunciation: [mɔ̃ lɛ nœfʃato, -nøʃato], literally Mont near Neufchâteau) is a commune in the Vosges department in Grand Est in northeastern France.

== See also ==
- Communes of the Vosges department
- Fort de Bourlémont
