= Mike Cofer =

Mike Cofer may refer to:

- Mike Cofer (kicker) (born 1964), American football kicker
- Mike Cofer (linebacker) (1960–2019), American football linebacker
