= Surgy =

- Commune
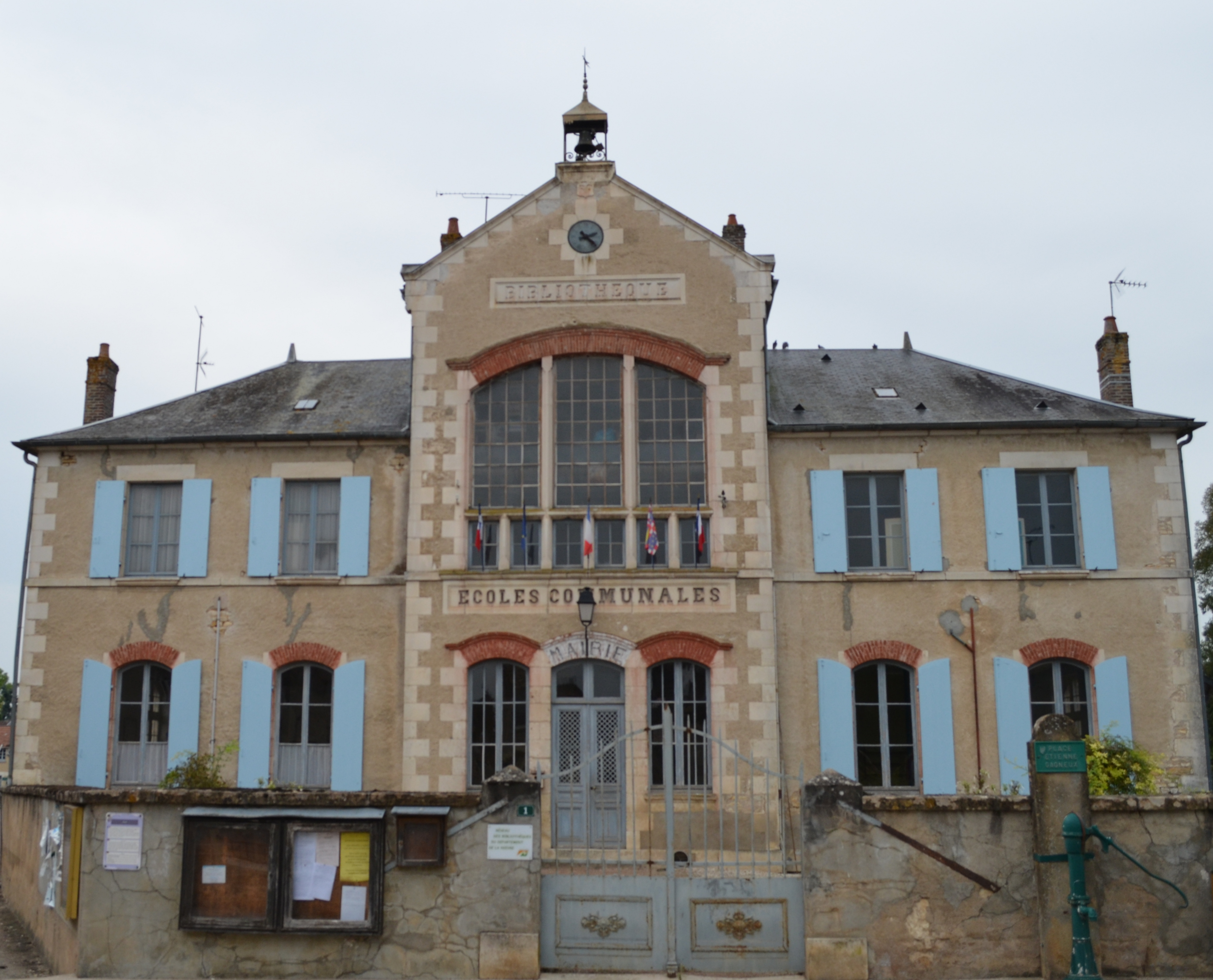
- The town hall in Surgy
- Location of Surgy
- Location within France Location within Bourgogne-Franche-Comté
- Coordinates: 47°30′36″N 3°30′56″E
- Country: France
- Region: Bourgogne-Franche-Comté
- Department: Nièvre
- Arrondissement: Clamecy
- Canton: Clamecy

Government
  - Mayor (2020–2026): Denis Forestier
- Area^{1}: 16.03 km^{2} (6.19 sq mi)
- Highest elevation: 214 m (702 ft)
- Lowest elevation: 137 m (449 ft)
- Population (2023): 335
  - Density: 20.9/km^{2} (54.1/sq mi)
- Time zone: UTC+01:00 (CET)
  - Summer (DST): UTC+02:00 (CEST)
- INSEE/Postal code: 58282 /58500
- ^{1} French Land Register data, which excludes lakes, ponds, glaciers > 1 km^{2} (0.386 sq mi or 247 acres) and river estuaries.

Surgy (French pronunciation: [syʁʒi]) is a commune in the Nièvre department in central France.

== See also ==
- Communes of the Nièvre department
