= Coffer (fortification) =

In fortification, a coffer is a hollow lodgment against a dry moat, the upper part being made of pieces of timber raised about two feet above the level of the moat. This elevation has hurdles filled with earth which serves as a parapet with embrasures. The coffer is similar to the caponier. The difference is that the former may be made beyond the counterscarp, and the latter is always in the moat. Another difference is that the coffer takes the whole breadth of the moat while the caponier does not.

== See also ==
- Cofferdam
