= Fort Napoleon, Ostend =

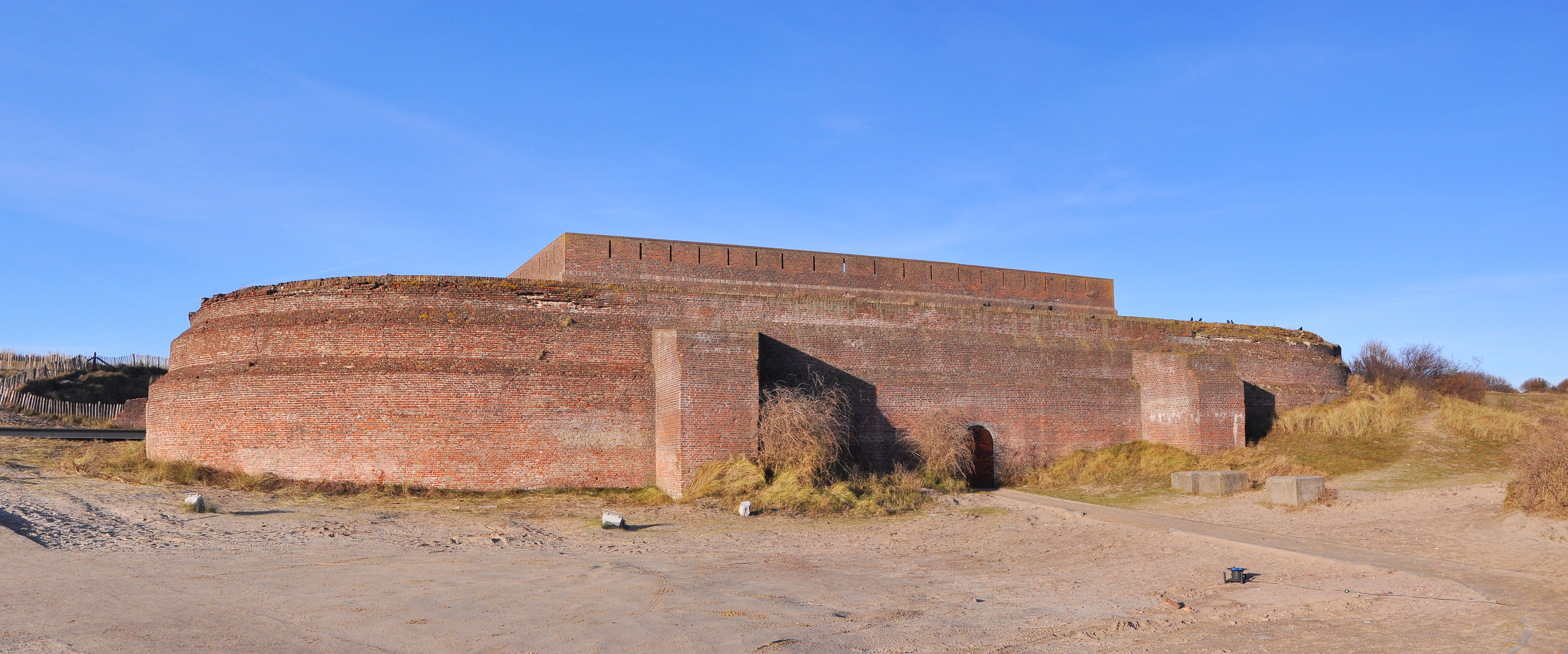
- Fort Napoleon in Ostend

- Location within Belgium
- Established: 1811
- Location: Ostend, West Flanders, Belgium
- Coordinates: 51.2154°N 2.9287°E
- Type: Military Museum
- Parking: On site
- Website: Website in Dutch and French

Fort Napoleon in Ostend is a polygonal fort built in the Napoleonic era. It has recently been restored and is open to the public.

== War of the Fifth Coalition ==
France had occupied the Austrian Netherlands (a territory roughly corresponding to the borders of modern Belgium) during 1792 and 1793 in the Flanders Campaign of the French Revolutionary Wars. During the War of the Fifth Coalition, Napoleon Bonaparte expected a British assault from the sea on the port of Ostend, and the fort was constructed in the sand dunes close to the mouth of the harbour in 1811. The British attack never materialised and the fort was used for troop accommodation and as an arsenal until the end of the French occupation in 1814 when it was abandoned.

== World War I ==
During World War I, the fort was used as accommodation for a German headquarters, and decorated with murals by German soldier Heinrich Otto Pieper. The heavy coastal artillery battery "Hindenburg" was stationed nearby; it had been transferred there from Fort Heppen, Wilhelmshaven in 1915, and it was armed with four 280 mm (11 inch) guns of 1886-1887 vintage in heavily armored turrets on semi-circular concrete platforms. It was captured by the Belgian army in 1918.

== World War II ==
The fort was also used as German artillery headquarters during World War II. After the war, it served as a museum and then a children's playground before falling into decay. In 1995, the fort came into the care of Erfgoed Vlaanderen vzw (the Flemish Heritage Association) and following a five-year restoration programme, was opened to the public in April 2000.

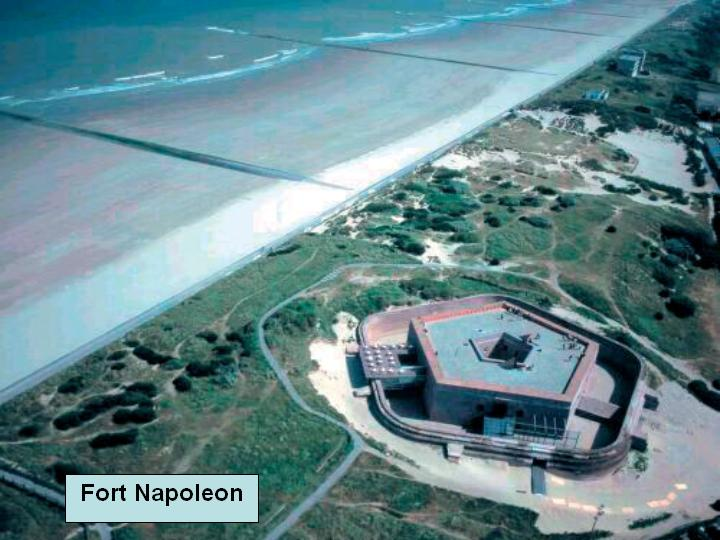
Aerial view

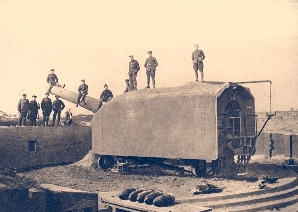
Hindenburg battery in 1918

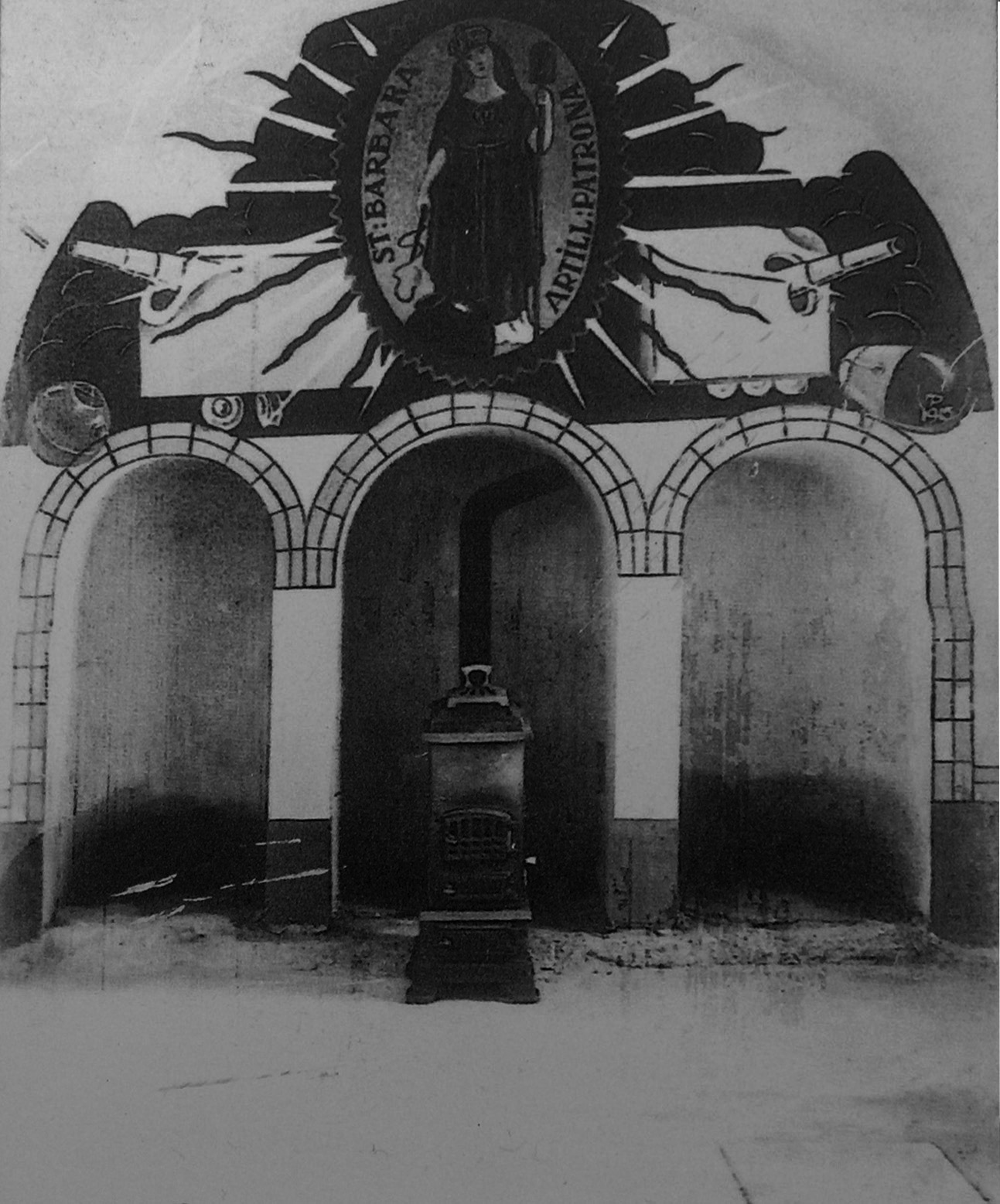
German murals inside the fort

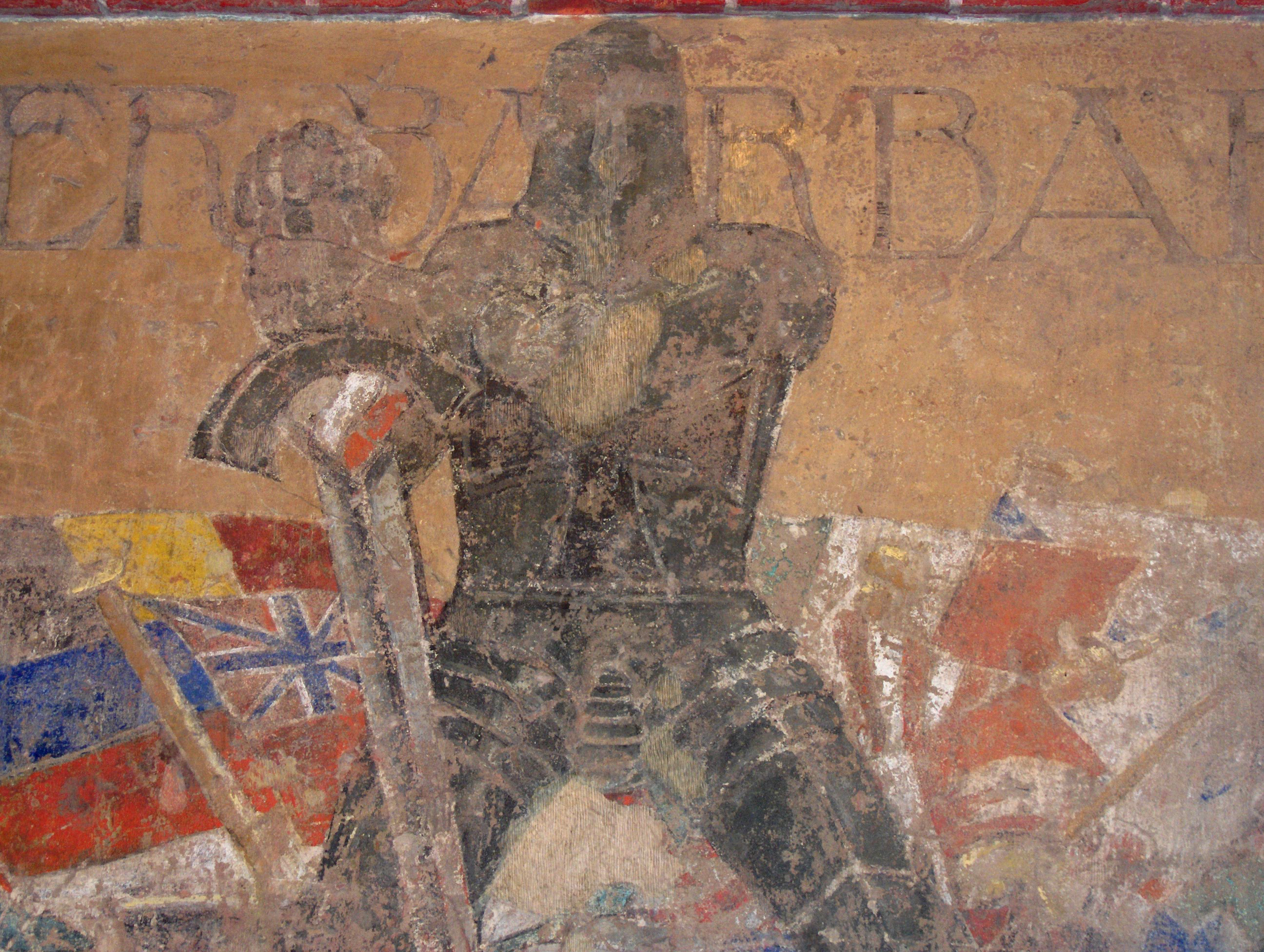
Mural by Heinrich Otto Pieper, painted during World War I.

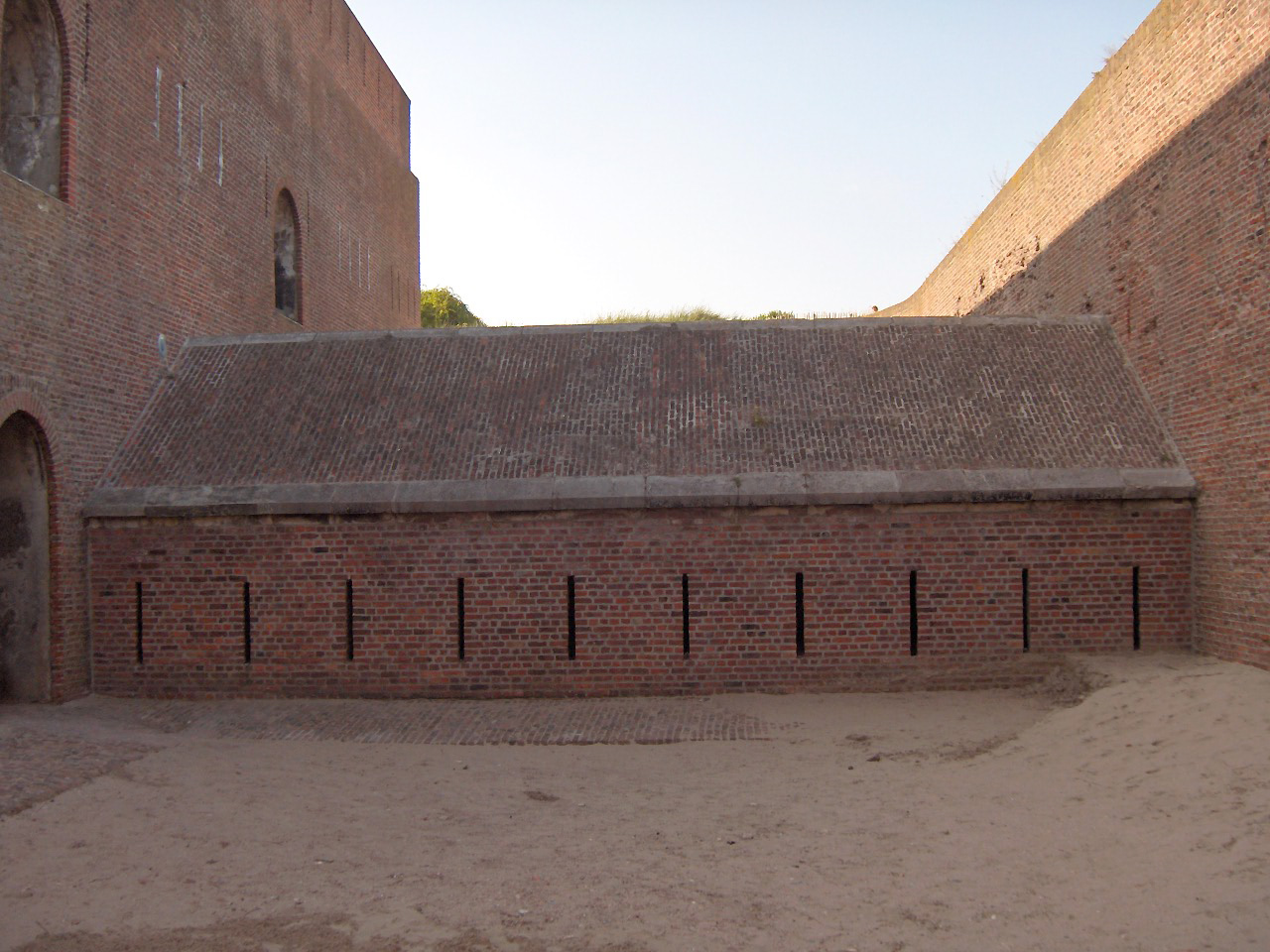
The caponier, straddling the ditch
