= Caponier =

Type of fortification structure

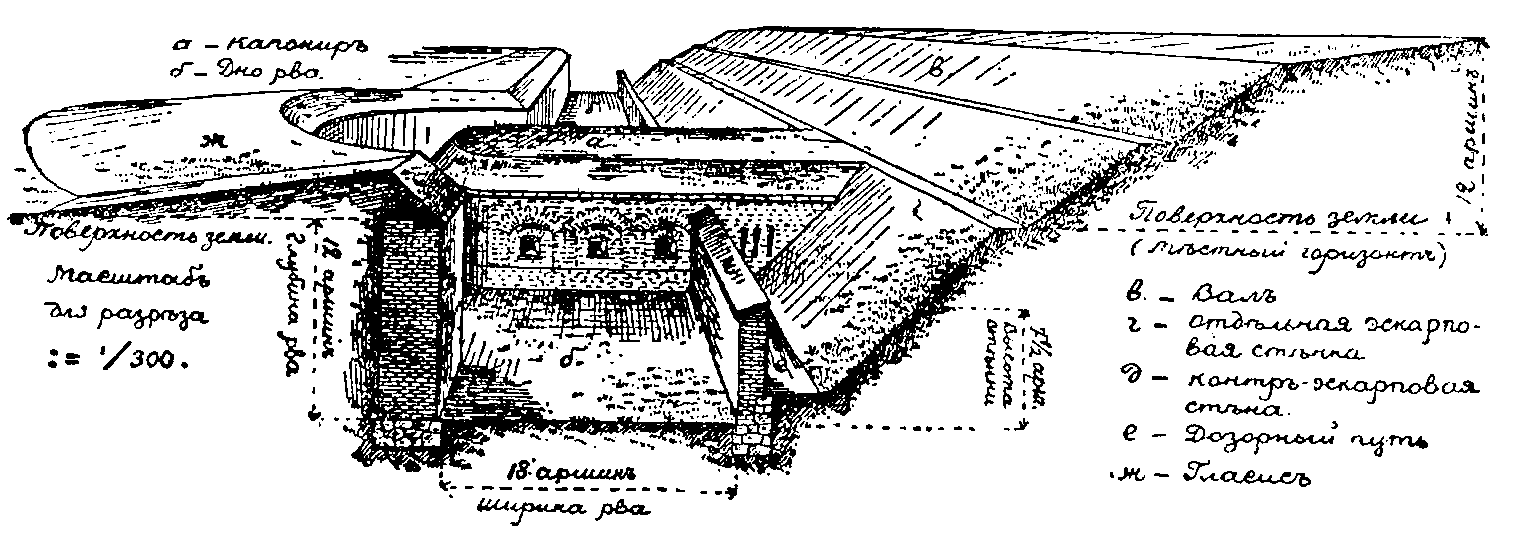
A caponier

A caponier is a type of defensive structure in a fortification. Fire from this point could cover the ditch beyond the curtain wall to deter any attempt to storm the wall. The word originates from the French caponnière, meaning "chicken coop" (a capon is a castrated male chicken).

In some types of bastioned fortifications, the caponier served as a means of access to the outworks, protecting troops from direct fire; they were often roofless. Although they could be used for firing along the ditch, the flanks of the bastions were the main defence of the ditch by fire. In later polygonal forts, caponiers were often roofed and were not intended as a type of covered way, but as the main way of keeping the ditch clear of a besieger.

== History ==
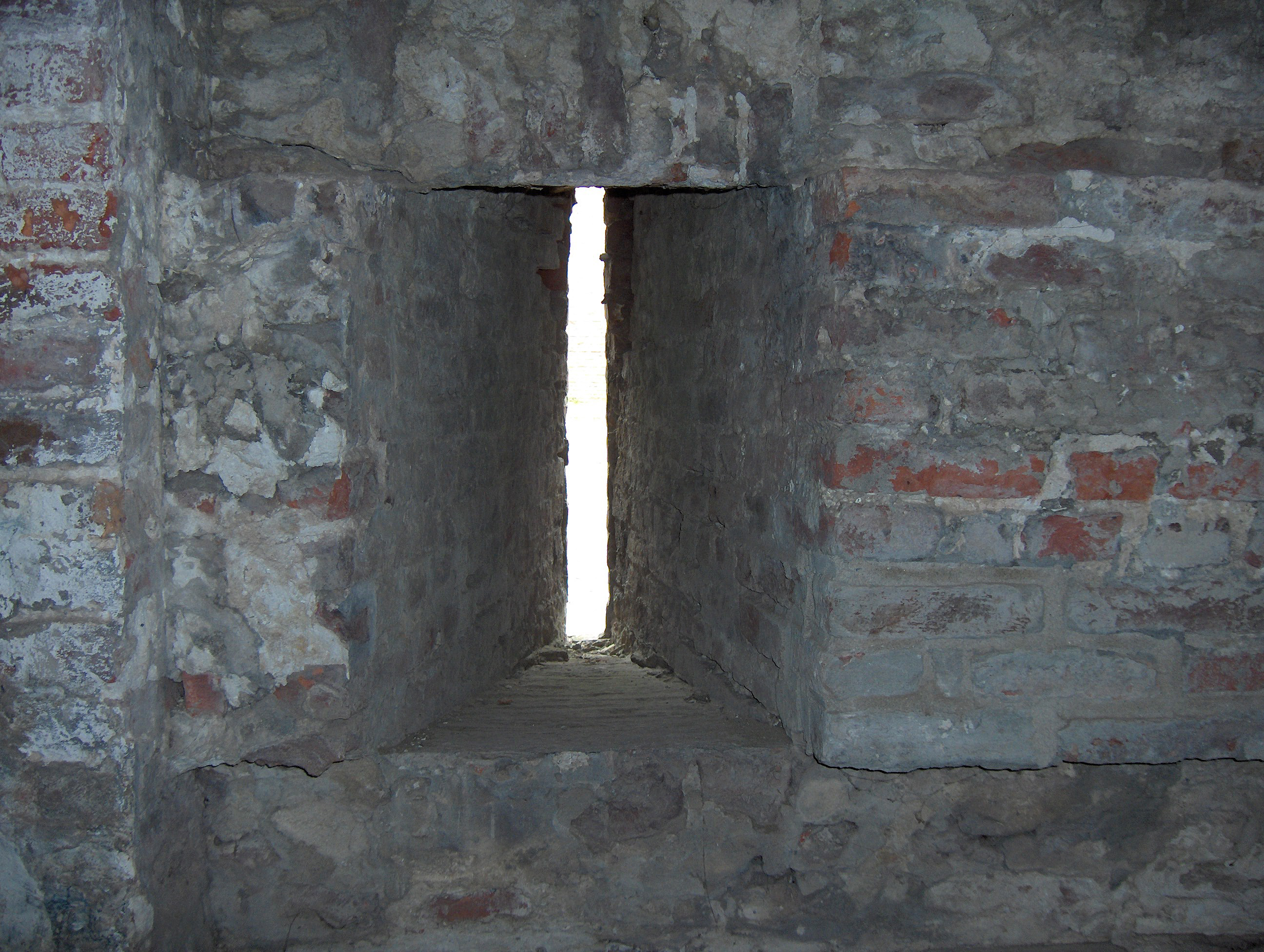
Rifle port inside a caponier, Fort Napoleon, Ostend, Belgium.

Originally the term referred to a covered passageway that traversed the ditch outside the curtain of a fortress. Fire from this point could cover the ditch beyond the curtain wall to deter any attempt to storm the wall. Thus the passageway was equipped with musket ports and cannon ports that fired along the ditch.

While fortifications were evolving to the simpler polygonal style, the term was sometimes used to describe the flanking positions set at the corners of the ditch that provide the same function in that style of fort, especially in France. In bastioned forts, it usually takes the form of a low open passage, often partly sunken into the floor of the ditch and projecting outward into and across it, with access from the main fortress via a passage through the curtain wall. The roof, if any, was often made against weather, observation and small arms fire, not artillery. As polygonal fortresses evolved, caponiers became more substantial, higher and protected above from plunging fire with masonry and earth cover. In late 19th century, works which were largely underground, caponiers were reached via a tunnel from within the fort.

== Equipment ==
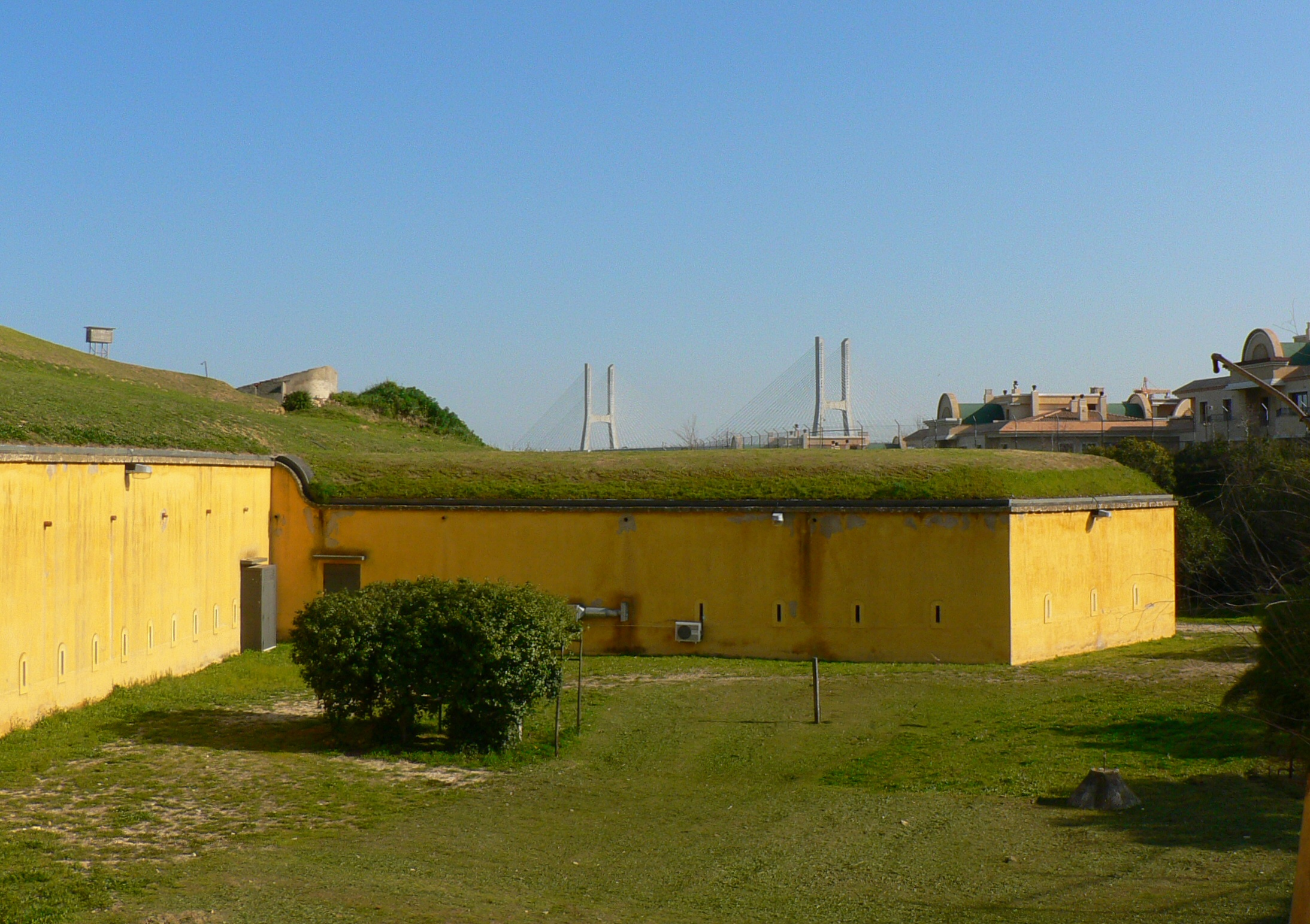
A caponier covered with a layer of earth, Sacavém Fort, Portugal.

The caponier is usually equipped with a firing step and rifle ports to allow troops to fire along the ditch, and often has provision for small cannon to sweep the ditch as well. To clear the smoke and fumes from the firing the roof of the caponier is often provided with ventilation ports. To avoid fire from one caponier bearing on the next, caponiers are sometimes set at alternate corners of the fort, so that they fire towards a blank wall at the opposite end of the ditch, giving full coverage of the ditch without subjecting the next caponier to fire. The length of the straight sections of the ditch is chosen so that it can be covered by fire from a single caponier. Caponiers are often wedge shaped so that they can fire down both angles of the ditch.

== Counterscarp battery ==
An alternative to the caponier is a counterscarp battery, dug into the outer face of the corner of the ditch, giving a similar field of fire. Reached by a tunnel from within the fort, it does not have the vulnerable roof that the caponier has, but being outside the ditch, is potentially more vulnerable to mining. Both structures may be found in the same fort.

== Locations of caponiers ==
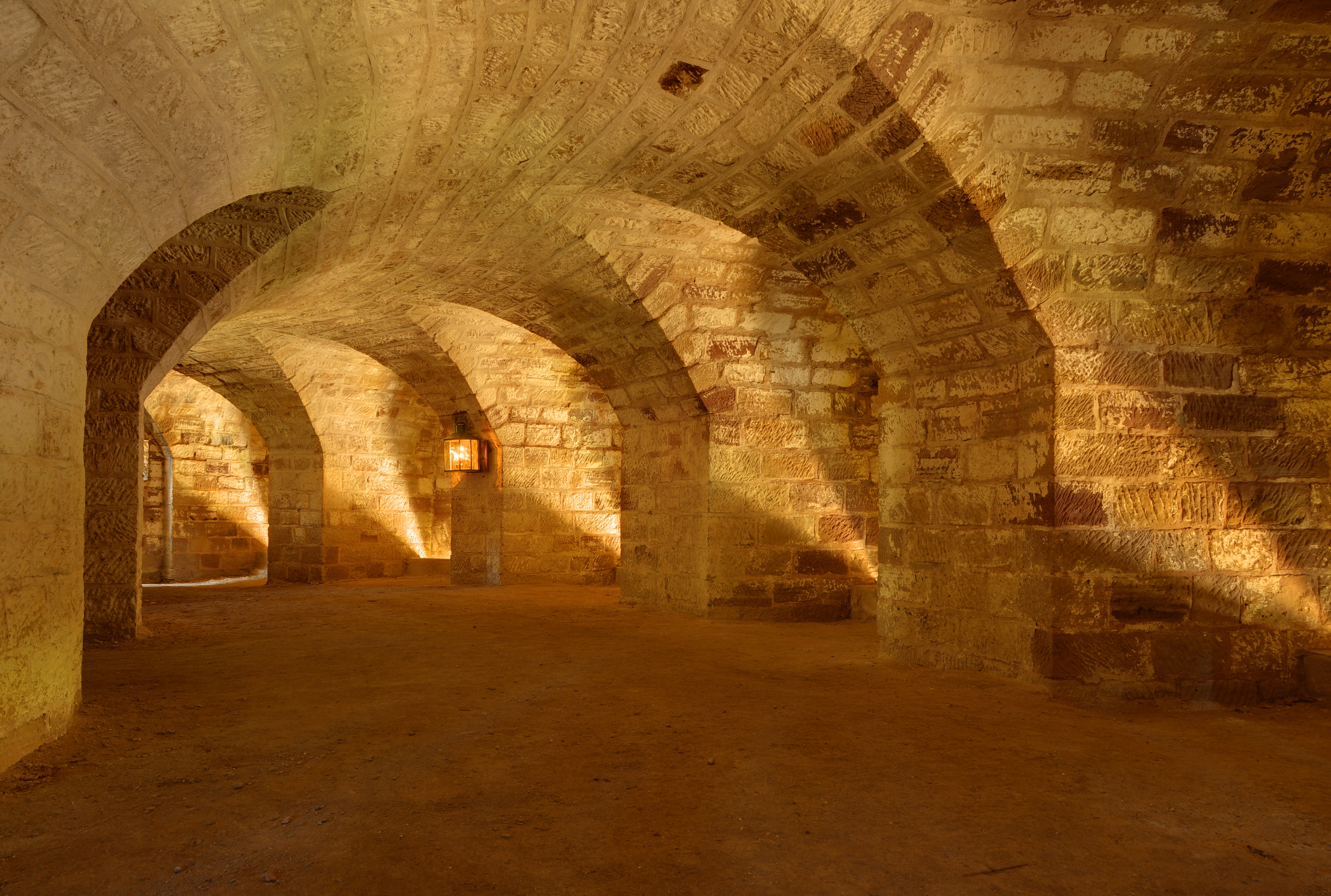
Interior of caponier at Fort de Bois l'Abbé

Caponiers are a common feature of 18th- and 19th-century fortifications and are found on almost all the Victorian forts of Malta, the Palmerston Forts in Britain, the Lisbon Entrenched Camp forts in Portugal, and fortifications in many Nordic countries. Caponiers were also found in:

- Birgu main ditch
- Fort Manoel
- Fort Ricasoli
- Boden Fortress in Sweden
- Brest-Litovsk fortrins
- Camden Fort Meagher, Crosshaven, Cork Harbour, Ireland
- Coalhouse Fort, Essex, England
- Craignethan Castle, Scotland, a good 16th century example
- Eluanbi Lighthouse in southern Taiwan
- Fort Glanville Conservation Park, Adelaide, South Australia
- Fort Hamilton, New York City, USA
- Fort McClary, Kittery Point, Maine
- Fort Thüngen, Luxembourg
- Fort Washington, Maryland, USA
- Fort Wellington, Prescott, Ontario, Canada
- Freshwater Redoubt, Isle of Wight, England
- Hurst Castle, Lymington, England
- Kyiv fortress
- Petersberg Citadel, Erfurt, Germany
- Poznań Fortress, Poland
- Sevastopol (Ukraine)
- Southsea Castle
- Spandau Citadel
- Rhodes medieval town, Greece
- Suomenlinna in Finland
- York Redoubt and Fort Charlotte, Halifax Regional Municipality, Canada
- Newhaven Fort in East Sussex, UK
- East Jiguan Hill Fortress (Japanese: 東鶏冠山北堡塁) in Lüshun, Liaoning, China

== Gallery ==
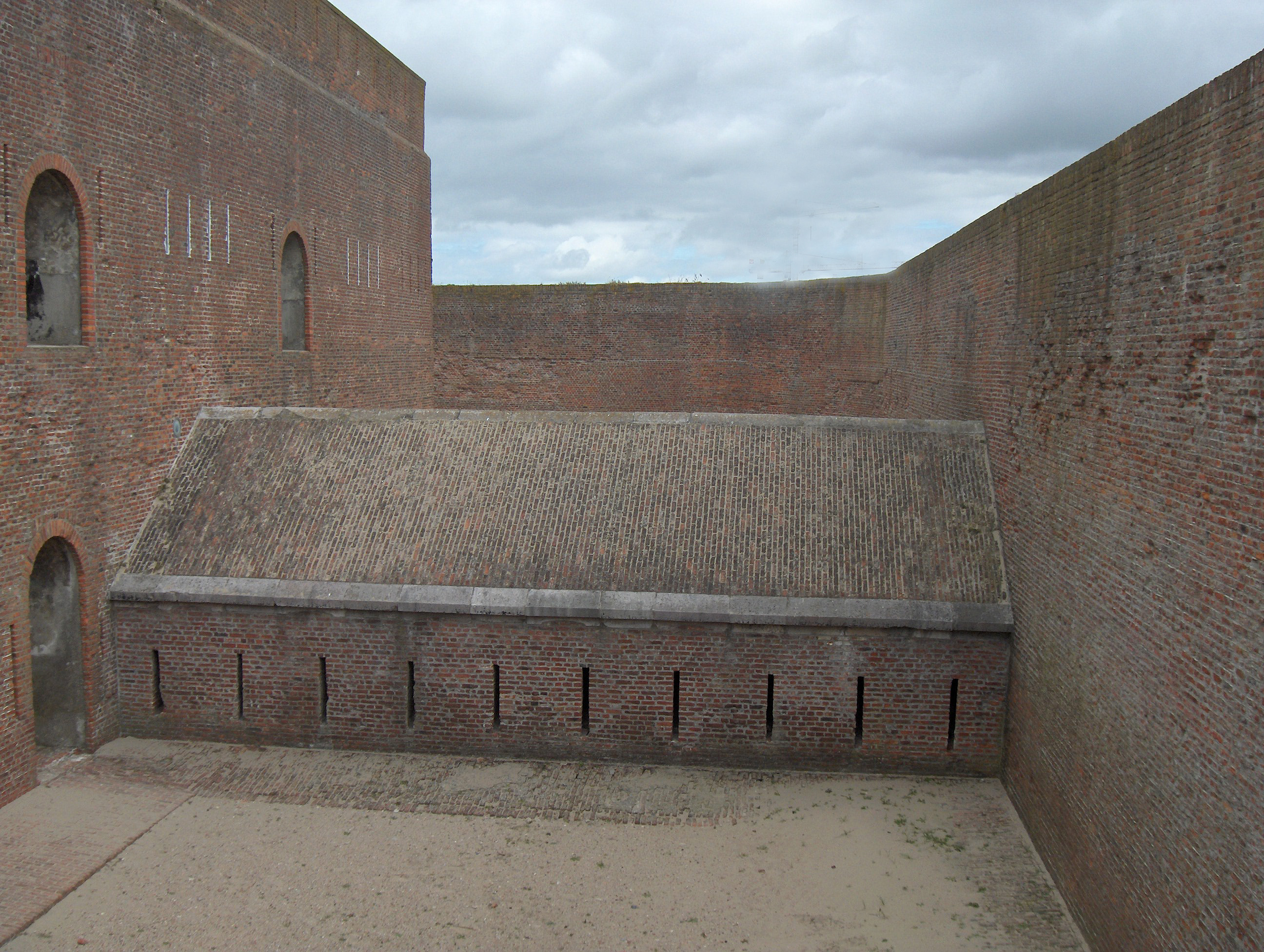
Caponier, Fort Napoleon, Ostend, Belgium

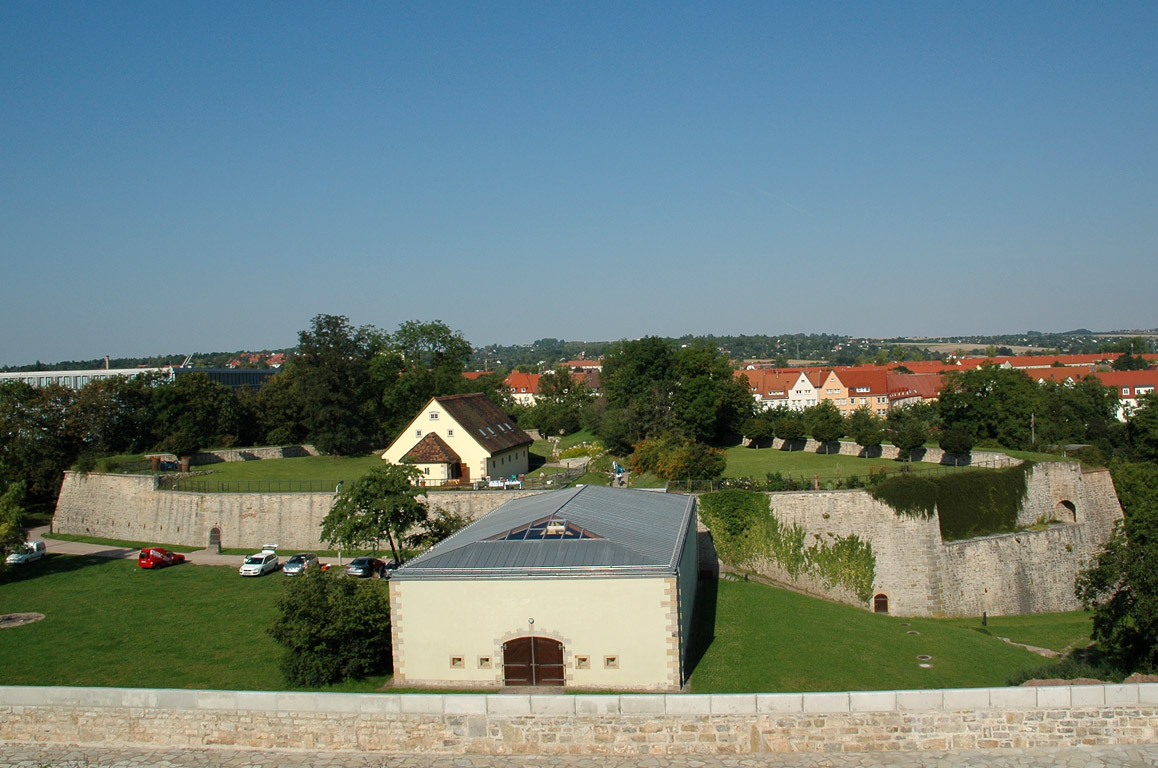
Caponier between the citadel wall and Ravelin Anselm, Petersberg Citadel, Germany

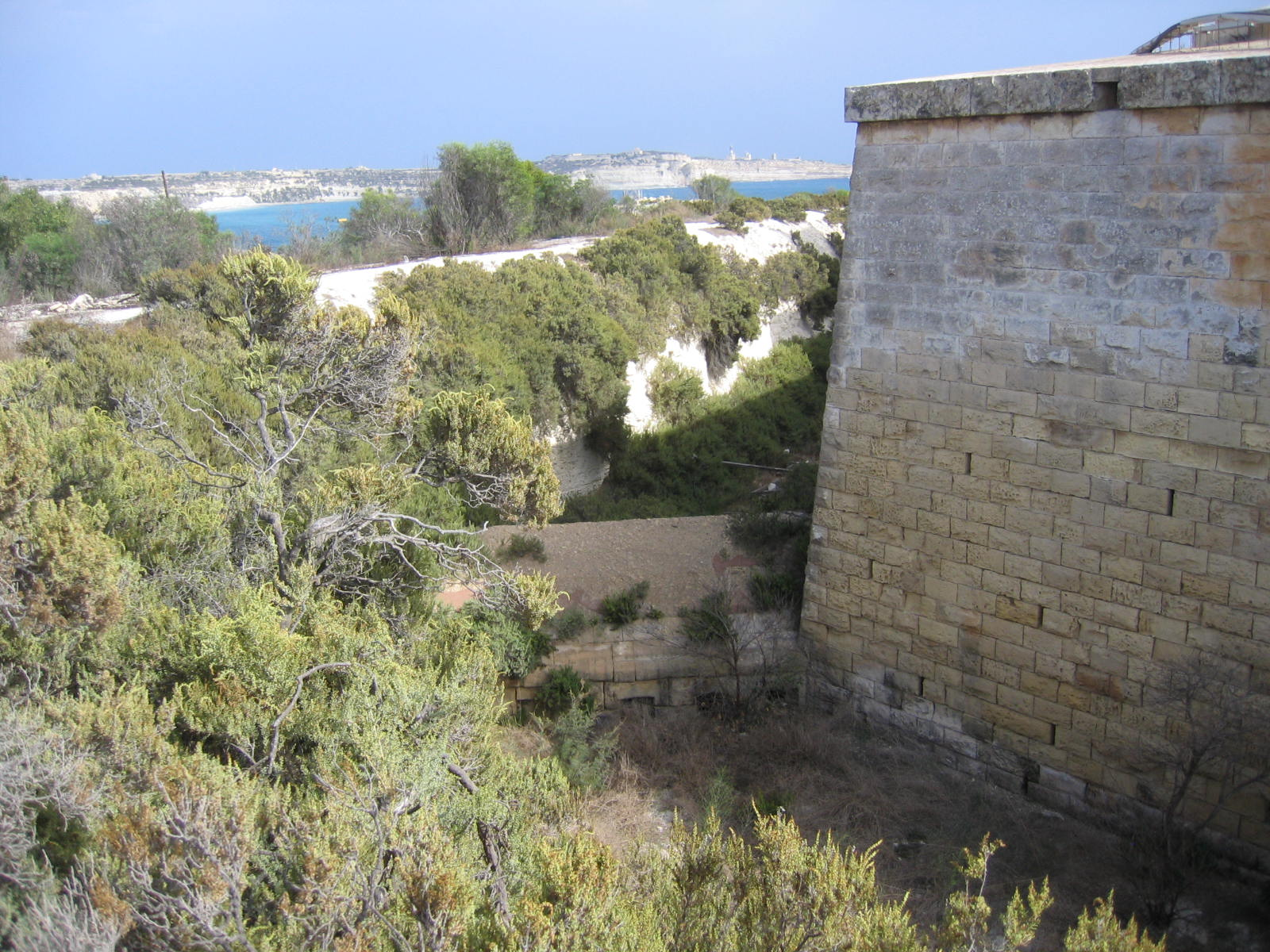
Caponier, Fort San Lucian Malta

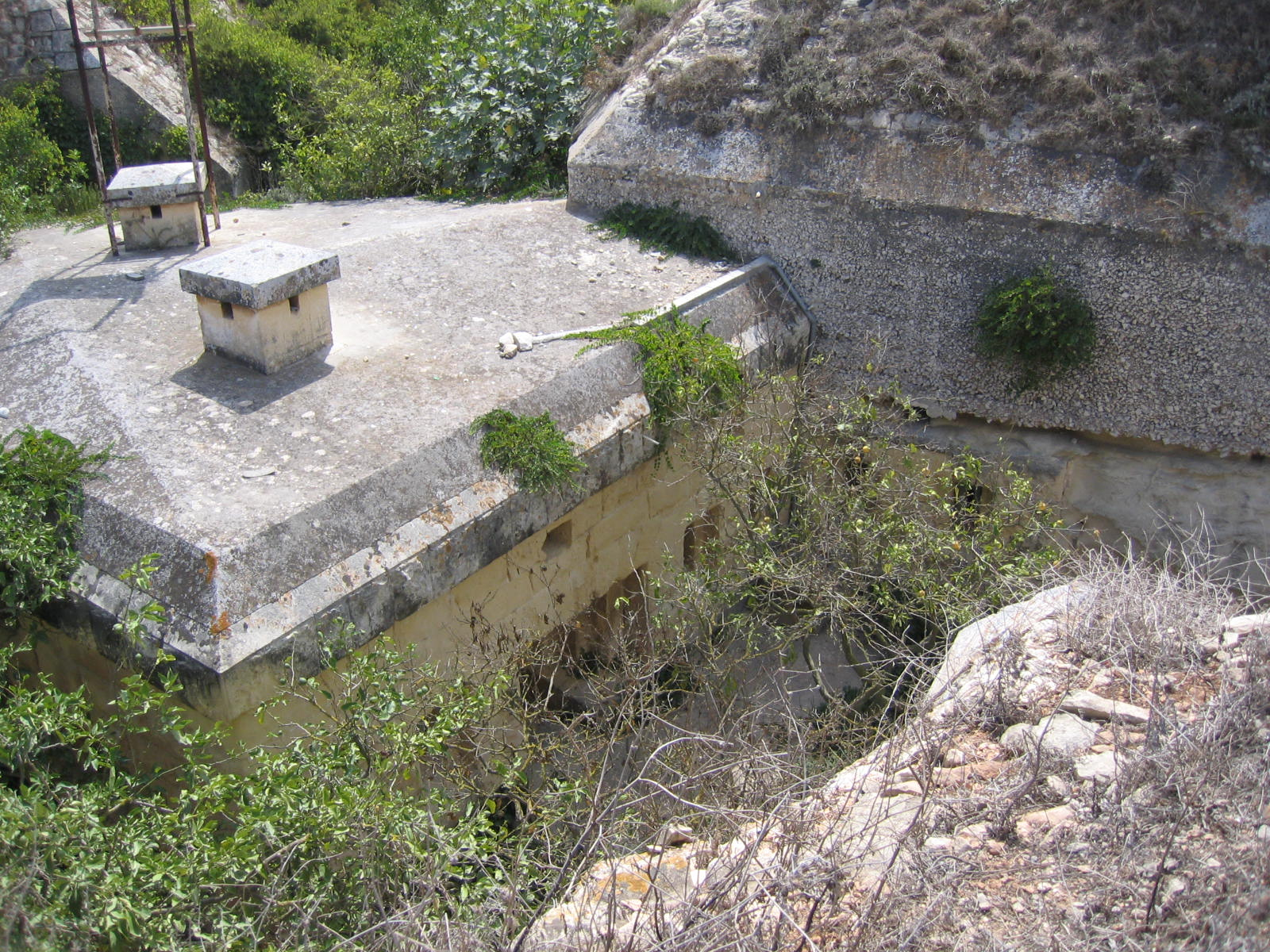
Caponier, Fort Tas-Silġ Malta

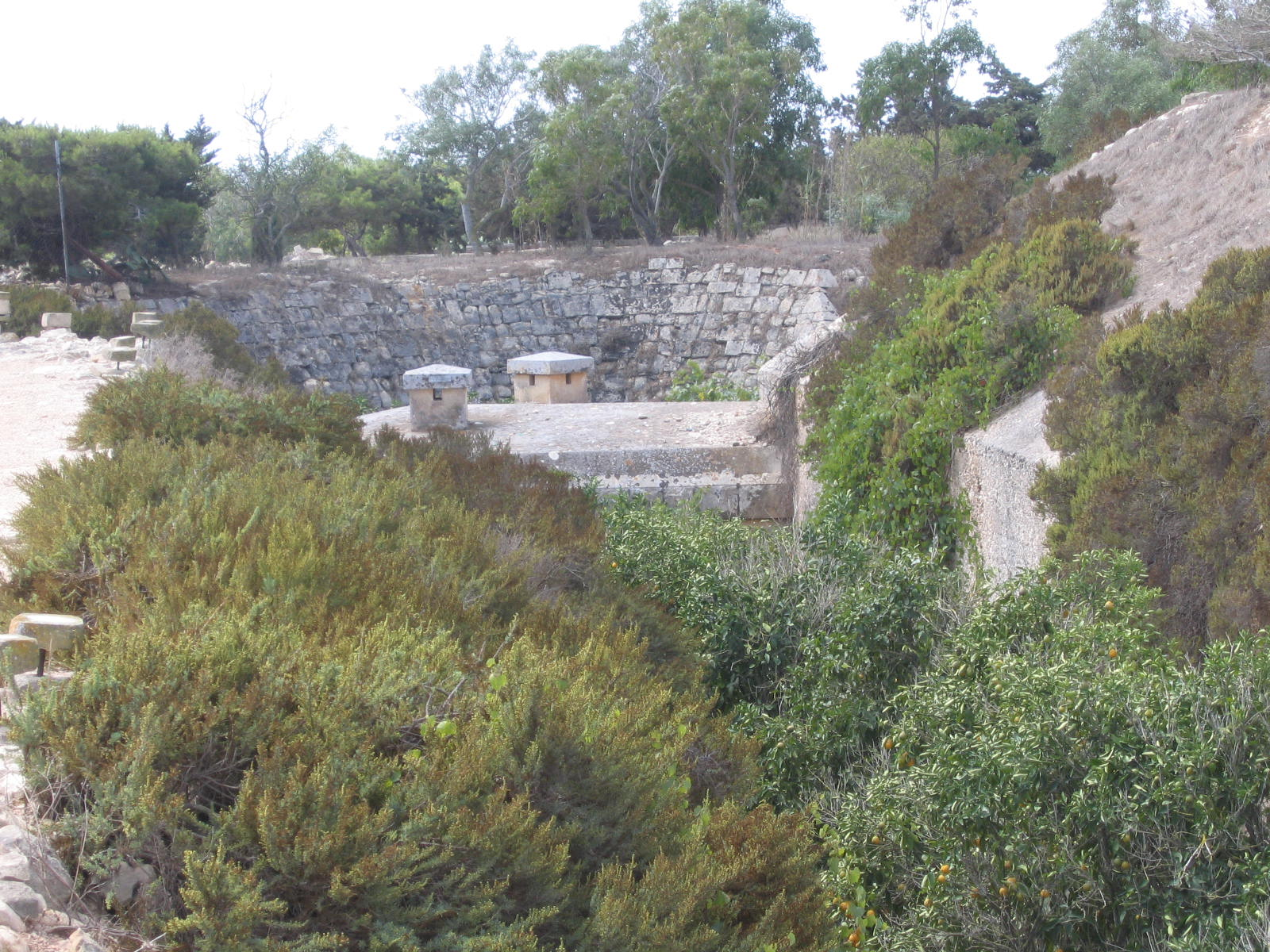
Caponier, Fort Tas-Silġ Malta

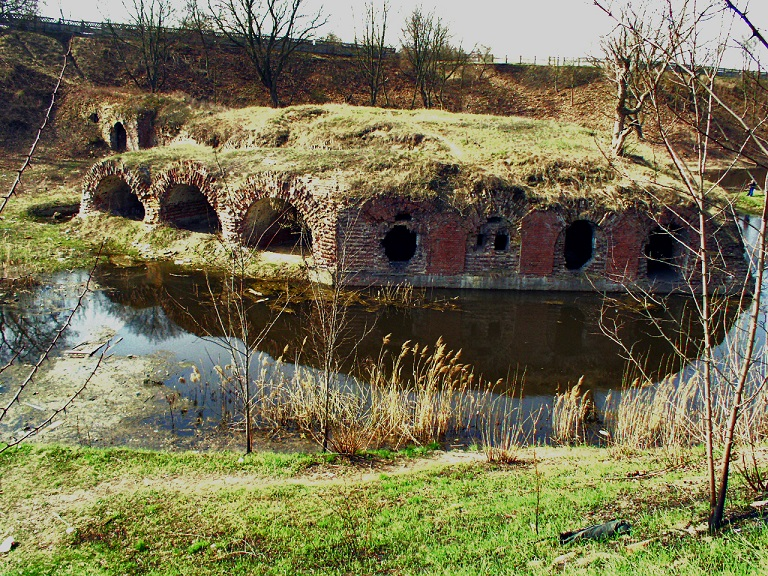
Caponier, Brest Fortress Belarus

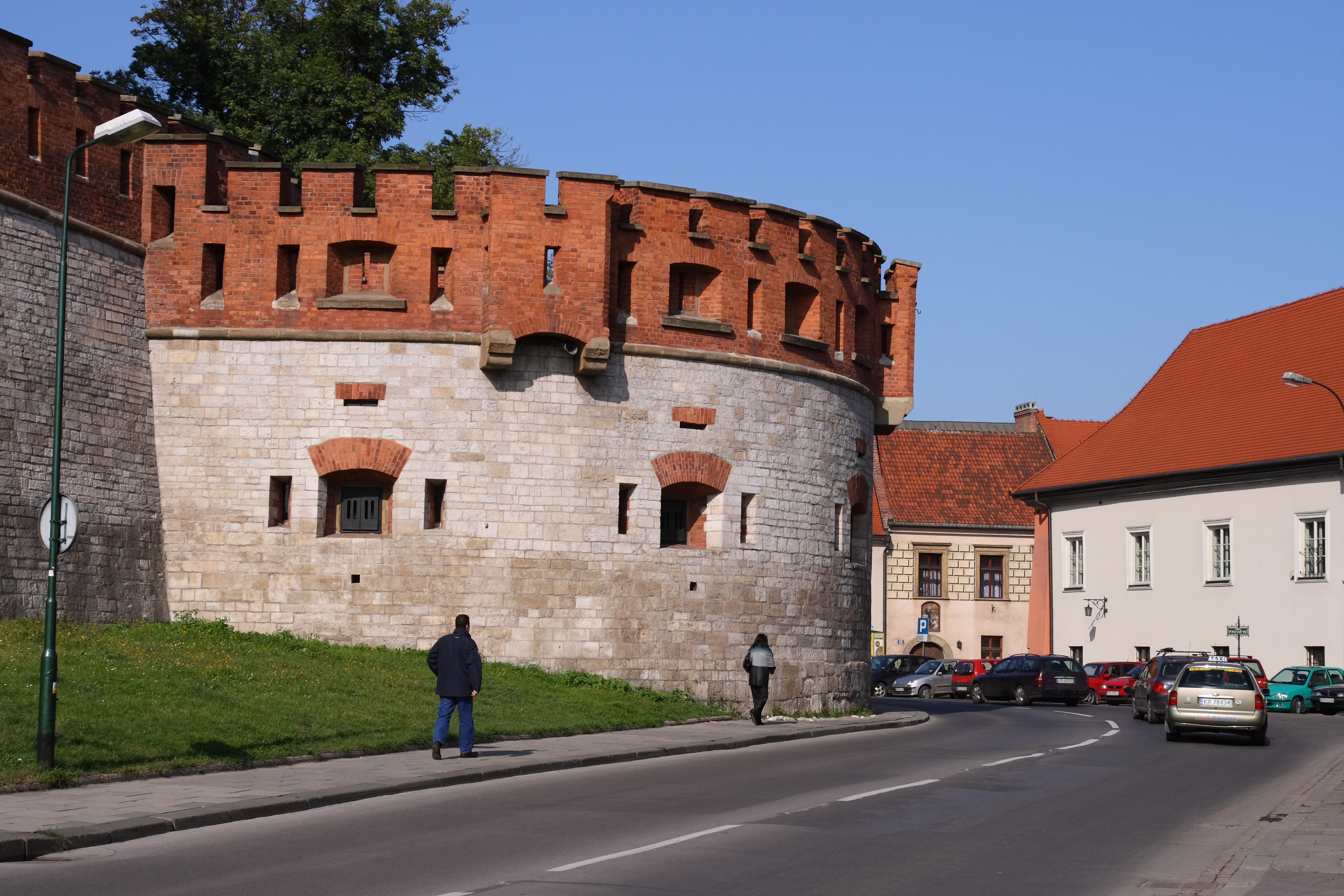
Caponier. Wawel Poland

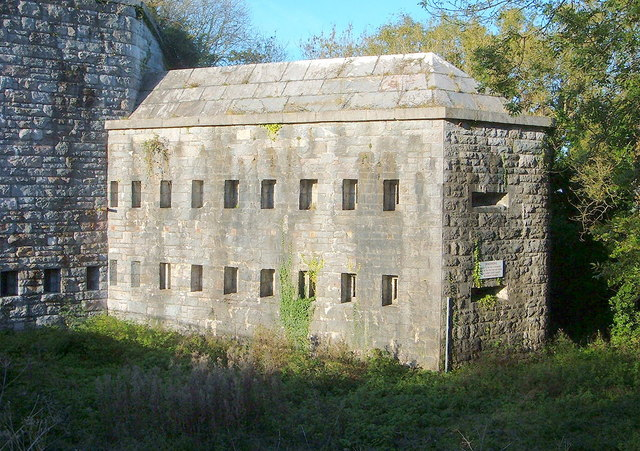
Caponier, Scraesdon Fort, Cornwall, United Kingdom

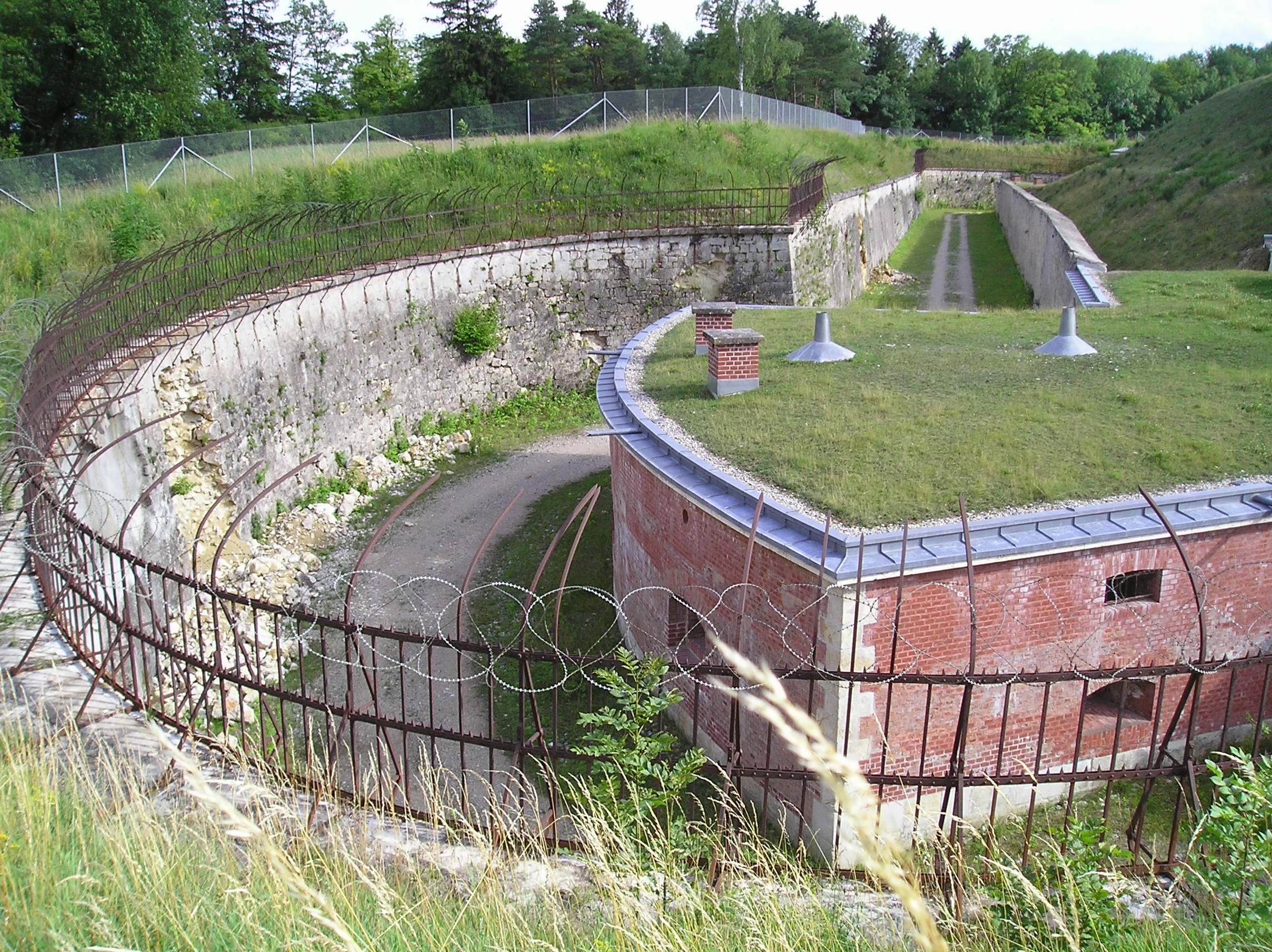
Caponier, Fort Prinz Karl near Großmehring, Germany

== See also ==
- Coffer (fortification)
- List of established military terms
