= Plymouth City Council elections =

Local government elections in Devon, England

Plymouth City Council is the local authority for the unitary authority of Plymouth in Devon, England. Until 1 April 1998 it was a non-metropolitan district.

== Political control ==
Since the first election to the council in 1973 following the reforms of the Local Government Act 1972, political control of the council has been held by the following parties:

Composition of the council
Year	Conservative	Labour	Liberal Democrats (Note: Includes totals for the predecessors of the Liberal Democrats, the Liberal Party and SDP (both of which participated in the Alliance).)	Green (Note: Includes totals for the predecessors of the Green Party of England and Wales, the Ecology Party and Green Party UK.)	UKIP	Reform UK	Independents & Others	Council control after election
Local government reorganisation; council established (66 seats)
1973	37	29	0	–	–	–	0	Conservative
1976	39	27	0	0	–	–	0	Conservative
New ward boundaries (60 seats)
1979	33	26	0	0	–	–	1 (Note: 1 Independent Conservative)	Conservative
1983	34	23	0	0	–	–	3 (Note: 3 Independent Conservative)	Conservative
1987	31	19	10	0	–	–	0	Conservative
1991	19	41	0	0	–	–	0	Labour
1995	6	54	0	0	0	–	0	Labour
Plymouth becomes a unitary authority (60 seats)
1997	13	47	0	0	0	–	0	Labour
2000	38	22	0	0	0	–	0	Conservative
New ward boundaries (60 seats)
2003	18	36	3	0	0	–	0	Labour
2004	19	35	2	0	0	–	0	Labour
2006	25	28	3	0	0	–	1	No overall control
2007	31	26	0	0	0	–	0	Conservative
2008	37	20	0	0	0	–	0	Conservative
2010	36	20	0	0	0	–	1	Conservative
2011	31	25	0	0	0	–	0	Conservative
2012	26	31	0	0	0	–	0	Labour
2012	26	31	0	0	0	–	0	Labour
2014	24	30	0	0	3	–	0	Labour
2015	26	28	0	0	3	–	0	No overall control
2016	27	27	0	0	3	–	0	No overall control
2018	26	31	0	0	0	0	0	Labour
2019	25	31	0	0	1	0	0	Labour
2021	26	24	0	0	0	0	7	No overall control
2022	24	24	0	1	0	0	8	No overall control
2023	18	31	0	2	0	0	5 (Note: 3 Independent Alliance, 2 Independents)	Labour
2024	7	42	0	2	0	0	6	Labour
2026	3	31	0	3	0	16	4	Labour

== Result maps ==
1979 results map

1983 results map

1987 results map

1991 results map

1995 results map

1997 results map

2000 results map

2003 results map

2004 results map

2006 results map

2007 results map

2008 results map

2010 results map

2011 results map

2012 results map

2014 results map

2015 results map

2016 results map

2018 results map

2019 results map

2021 results map

2022 results map

2023 results map

2024 results map

2026 results map

== By-elections ==
=== 1997-2000 ===
Honicknowle By-Election 7 August 1997
Party	Candidate	Votes	%	±%
Labour		1,328	61.1	−11.3
Conservative		420	19.3	−8.3
Liberal Democrats		344	15.8	+15.8
Independent		67	3.1	+3.1
Independent Democrat		14	0.6	+0.6
Majority		908	41.8	
Turnout		2,173	23.0	
Labour hold		Swing		

Ham By-Election 25 September 1997
Party	Candidate	Votes	%	±%
Labour		1,017	65.5	+4.8
Conservative		307	19.8	−2.3
Liberal Democrats		173	11.1	+11.1
Independent Democrat		56	3.6	−13.6
Majority		710	45.7	
Turnout		1,553		
Labour hold		Swing		

=== 2000-2003 ===
Mount Gould By-Election 2 May 2002 (2)
Party	Candidate	Votes	%	±%
Labour		1,179		
Labour		1,101		
Liberal Democrats		590		
Liberal Democrats		566		
Conservative		464		
Conservative		449		
Green		120		
Green		119		
UKIP		51		
Turnout		4,639	29.9	
Labour hold		Swing		
Labour gain from Conservative		Swing		

St Budeaux By-Election 2 May 2002
Party	Candidate	Votes	%	±%
Labour		1,253	55.7	+8.9
Conservative		715	31.8	−6.7
Liberal Democrats		282	12.5	+0.0
Majority		538	23.9	
Turnout		2,250	25.5	
Labour hold		Swing		

=== 2003-2006 ===
Southway By-Election 22 June 2006
Party	Candidate	Votes	%	±%
Labour	James Kirk	1,624	43.3	+3.9
Conservative	Brenda Brookshaw	1,517	40.5	+0.3
Liberal Democrats	Terrance O'Connor	214	5.7	−14.7
BNP	Liam Birck	200	5.3	+5.3
UKIP	Thomas Williams	139	3.7	+3.7
Green	Raymond Tuohy	53	1.4	+1.4
Majority		107	2.8	
Turnout		3,747	40.4	
Labour hold		Swing		

=== 2006-2010 ===
Ham By-Election 3 September 2009
Party	Candidate	Votes	%	±%
Labour	Tina Tuohy	1,243	44.0	+2.7
Conservative	Nigel Churchill	676	23.9	−15.7
UKIP	Andrew Leigh	442	15.6	+15.6
Independent	Margaret Storer	204	7.2	+7.2
Liberal Democrats	Rebecca Trimnell	181	6.4	−6.8
BNP	Adrian Romilly	82	2.9	+2.9
Majority		567	20.1	
Turnout		2,828	29.0	
Labour hold		Swing		

=== 2010-2014 ===
Southway By-Election 27 June 2013
Party	Candidate	Votes	%	±%
Labour	Jonny Morris	1,247	43.1	−8.2
UKIP	Peter David Berrow	764	26.4	+4.6
Conservative	David Alexander Downie	487	16.8	−10.0
Independent	Dennis Law Silverwood	290	10.0	+10.0
Liberal Democrats	Justin Dominic Stafford	82	2.8	+2.8
TUSC	Ryan Aldred	22	22 0.8	+0.8
Majority		483		
Turnout			29.24	
Labour hold		Swing		

=== 2018-2022 ===
Stoke By-Election 26 July 2018
Party	Candidate	Votes	%	±%
Labour	Jemima Laing	1,427	52.8%	+0.2%
Conservative	Kathy Watkin	981	36.3%	+2.8%
Liberal Democrats	Connor Clarke	174	6.4%	+1.4%
Active for Plymouth	Iuliu Popescue	123	4.5%	+4.5%
Majority				
Turnout				
Labour hold		Swing		

=== 2022-2026 ===
Moor View By-Election 12 January 2023
Party	Candidate	Votes	%	±%
Labour	Will Noble	1,415	53.2	+16.7
Conservative	Andrea Johnson	877	33.0	−21.0
Independent	Gavin Marshall	184	6.9	+6.9
Green	Frank Hartkopf	87	3.3	−0.7
Liberal Democrats	Colin Mackenzie	77	2.9	−1.5
TUSC	Andrew White	18	0.7	−0.4
Majority		538	20.2	
Turnout		2,658		
Labour gain from Conservative		Swing		

Plympton Chaddlewood By-Election 12 January 2023
Party	Candidate	Votes	%	±%
Green	Lauren McLay	653	44.9	−12.8
Conservative	Ashley Ward	425	29.2	−5.7
Independent	Andrew Hill	182	12.5	+12.5
Labour	Lindsay Gilmour	147	10.1	+2.7
Liberal Democrats	Mike Gillbard	33	2.3	+2.3
TUSC	Benjamin Davy	15	1.0	+1.0
Majority		228	15.7	
Turnout		1,455		
Green gain from Conservative		Swing		

Efford and Lipson By-Election 15 June 2023
Party	Candidate	Votes	%	±%
Labour	Paul McNamara	1,204	58.8	−0.1
Conservative	Will Jones	423	20.6	−1.0
Green	Pat Bushell	196	9.6	−2.1
Liberal Democrats	Alexander Primmer	80	3.9	−1.5
Independent	Chaz Singh	69	3.4	+3.4
Heritage	Darryl Ingram	54	2.6	+2.6
TUSC	Neil Prentice	23	1.1	−1.3
Majority		781	38.1	
Turnout		2,049		
Labour hold		Swing		

Plymstock Dunstone By-Election 27 July 2023
Party	Candidate	Votes	%	±%
Labour	Stefan Krizanac	1,072	33.2	−17.5
Conservative	Julie Hunt	919	28.4	−1.7
Liberal Democrats	Peter Edwards	596	18.4	+13.6
Independent	Grace Stickland	480	14.9	+14.9
Green	Bruce Robinson	97	3.0	−0.7
Heritage	Darryl Ingram	55	1.7	+1.3
TUSC	Jackie Hilton	12	0.4	−0.1
Majority		153	4.7	
Turnout		3,231		
Labour gain from Conservative		Swing		

St Peter and the Waterfront By-Election 27 July 2023
Party	Candidate	Votes	%	±%
Labour	Alison Raynsford	1,126	48.0	+0.0
Conservative	Ian Fleming	488	20.8	+2.6
Green	Shayna Newham-Joynes	206	8.8	−1.8
Liberal Democrats	Hugh Janes	175	7.5	+0.6
Reform	Andy Gibbons	174	7.4	+3.1
Independent	Chaz Singh	126	5.4	+5.4
TUSC	Ryan Aldred	52	2.2	−0.8
Majority		638	27.2	
Turnout		2,347		
Labour hold		Swing		
