= 2021 Plymouth City Council election =

2021 local election in Plymouth

← 2019	6 May 2021	2022 →

19 of the 57 seats to Plymouth City Council 29 seats needed for a majority
	First party	Second party	Third party
Leader	Nick Kelly	Tudor Evans	None
Party	Conservative	Labour	Independent
Leader's seat	Compton	Ham
Last election	25	31	1
Seats before	17	30	10
Seats won	14	5	0
Seats after	26	24	7
Seat change	▲9	▼6	▼3
Popular vote	34,311	22,998	2,256
Percentage	50.6%	33.9%	3.3%
- Map showing the results of contested wards in the 2021 Plymouth City Council elections.
Council control before election
Labour
Council control after election
No overall control

The 2021 Plymouth City Council election was held on 6 May 2021 to elect members of Plymouth City Council in England.

The Labour Party took control of the council after the 2018 election, with thirty-one members and a working majority that they held in the 2019 election. Labour defended eleven seats and the Conservatives defended eight seats. The election was originally due to take place in May 2020, but was postponed due to the COVID-19 pandemic. The Conservatives won the most seats and the popular vote, but was not able to take over the council, resulting in no overall control.

== Background ==
Plymouth City Council will hold local elections, along with councils across England as part of the 2021 local elections. The council elects its councillors in thirds, with a third of seats being up for election every year for three years, with no election each fourth year to correspond with councillors' four-year terms. Councillors defending their seats in this election were previously elected in 2016. In that election, eleven Labour candidates and eight Conservative candidates were elected.

Following the 2018 Plymouth City Council election, the council has been controlled by the Labour Party, initially with thirty-one councillors.

Kevin Neil, who was elected in 2018, was suspended from the Labour Party when a police investigation was launched into him. He continues to sit as an independent following the closure of the police investigation, pending an internal investigation by the party. Chaz Singh, who was first elected in 2011, left the Labour Party in September 2019 saying that his party membership was incompatible with his Sikh faith. The Labour group leader Tudor Evans said that Singh's resignation followed a conversation about Singh's conduct. Margaret Corvid, who was first elected in 2018, was suspended from the Labour Party in December 2019 over accusations of antisemitism over comments she made in 2007 about "Zionist collaboration with the Nazis". She was reinstated in February 2020 after apologising and saying that her views had changed, pointing to her speech in June 2018 in support of the Working Definition of Antisemitism developed by the International Holocaust Remembrance Alliance.

An internal Labour Party report in March 2020 predicted that the party would lose control of Plymouth City Council in the election, then scheduled for May 2020. In the same month, Nick Kelly replaced Ian Bowyer as leader of the Conservative group on the council. The election was postponed to May 2021 due to the ongoing COVID-19 pandemic. The former Conservative group leader Ian Bowyer and Tony Carson resigned from the Conservative group in October 2020 after being investigated by the party for publishing a press release advocating a reduction in the speed limit on the A38 road through the city. Six other Conservative councillors, Lynda Bowyer, Heath Cook, Richard Ball, Andrea Johnson, Nigel Churchill and Kathy Watkin also resigned from the group in protest, with all eight to sit as independent Conservatives. Kelly said that they left the group because they "couldn’t always get their own way all of the time".

In February 2021, Conservative councillors criticised the expense incurred in buying and installing a statue by Antony Gormley in West Hoe. The council clarified that the money came from a capital budget funded by grants and borrowing, and couldn't have been spent on day-to-day council operations. Labour councillors said that the funding for the statue had been approved in 2017 as part of Mayflower anniversary celebrations, when the council was controlled by the Conservatives. In March 2021, Stephen Bush wrote that the election was an opportunity for the Conservatives to gain seats due to previous UKIP performance in the city, and noted that Labour would only need to lose two seats to lose overall control of the council. In the same month, the Conservative councillor Mark Deacon was suspended from the group for 21 days after posting a photo of himself in a wig and dress to make fun of a mooted curfew for men following the death of Sarah Everard.

== Previous council composition ==
Council composition following the 2019 council election

Council composition preceding the 2021 council election

Council composition following the 2021 council election

After 2019 election		Before 2021 election		After 2021 election	
Party	Seats	Party	Seats	Party	Seats
Labour	31	Labour	30	Labour	24
Conservative	25	Conservative	17	Conservative	26
Independent	1	Independent	10	Independent	7

== Campaign ==
Keir Starmer, the leader of the Labour Party, visited Plymouth on 7 April to campaign for the party. The Labour leader of the council Tudor Evans said that his party had already delivered most of the promises from the four-year plan published in 2018 with the remaining promises in the process of being fulfilled. The party's manifesto for the 2021 election said it would "create thousands of jobs and build more low-cost housing for rent or sale, with more help to older people, veterans, single people and residents with disabilities". Evans highlighted the diversity in backgrounds and careers that Labour candidates came from as a "brilliant reflection of Plymouth".

The Conservatives stood a candidate in all nineteen wards with elections. Of those, only two were incumbent councillors. The party published its manifesto on 13 April. It included pledges to make collection and disposal of garden waste easier, to buy the lease for Plymouth City Airport and to create a "futuristic park" on Plymouth Hoe. Other pledges included extending free parking schemes, the creation of more parking spaces and park-and-ride schemes, and seeking to make Royal Albert Bridge and Torpoint Ferry vehicle crossings free.

The Liberal Democrats said they were targeting Plymstock Dunstone in an attempt to win a seat on the council, with no current councillors being from that party. Their manifesto focused on social care and environmental issues. The Green Party said that if their candidates were elected as councillors, they would focus on accountability and involving the community in decision-making. The Trade Unionist and Socialist Coalition (TUSC) said that they would freeze council tax and end spending cuts if elected, by spending council reserves and borrowing money. Active For Plymouth, a party led by the taxi driver Jason Shopland, said they wanted to cut council tax and "automatic life sentences for rapists and paedophiles".

Emily Quick, a young mother and restaurant supervisor, is standing as an independent candidate in Southway, campaigning on local issues including litter, children's play areas, and re-establishing a post office in the area. Karen Pilkington, an independent candidate in Devonport, said she wanted to move away from party politics and cited the Flatpack Democracy model based on independent councillors' success in Frome in Somerset, under the Independents for Frome banner. Deanna Yates, an owner of the Finla Coffee coffee shop facing charges for failing to close in line with COVID-19 pandemic regulations in November 2020, is standing as an independent candidate in Plympton Erle. Danny Bamping, a director of Finla Coffee who represented the business in court, is standing as an independent candidate in Peverell. In 2020, Plymouth Council renamed John Hawkins Square after the black Plymouth Argyle footballer Jack Leslie due to concerns about historic racism and John Hawkins' status as a founder of the Atlantic slave trade. Bamping called the decision "racist" and unsuccessfully challenged the name change in court. Bamping, who said he owed the council more than £6,000 in unpaid council tax, said he wouldn't pay the council's £8,000 legal costs as the court had ordered.

== Results ==
Plymouth City Council released statements of persons nominated on 9 April. Asterisks denote sitting councillors seeking re-election.

Results are being announced on 7 May.

Plymouth City Council election 2021 map by vote share.

=== Summary ===
2021 Plymouth City Council election
Party	This election			Full council			This election		
Party	Seats	Net	Seats %	Other	Total	Total %	Votes	Votes %	+/−
Conservative	14	▲6	73.7	11	25	43.9	34,311	50.6	▲15.1
Labour	5	▼6	26.3	19	24	42.1	22,998	33.9	▼2.6
Independent	0	Steady	0.0	8	8	14.0	2,256	3.3	N/A
Green	0	Steady	0.0	0	0	0.0	5,082	7.5	▲5.0
Liberal Democrats	0	Steady	0.0	0	0	0.0	2,134	3.1	▼1.3
TUSC	0	Steady	0.0	0	0	0.0	563	0.8	▼1.0
Active for Plymouth	0	Steady	0.0	0	0	0.0	424	0.6	N/A
Heritage	0	Steady	0.0	0	0	0.0	38	0.1	N/A

All changes in voteshare are in comparison to the corresponding 2016 election

=== Budshead ===
Location of Budshead ward

Budshead 2021
Party	Candidate	Votes	%	±%
Conservative	Mark Shayer	1,830	50.1	▲12.8
Labour	Jon Taylor*	1,027	28.1	▼11.8
Independent	Dave Griffiths	513	14.1	N/A
Green	Josh Pope	167	4.6	▲1.7
Liberal Democrats	Colin MacKenzie	92	2.5	▲0.3
TUSC	Ashley Foster	21	0.6	▼0.2
Majority		803	22.0	N/A
Turnout		3,650	37.4	
Conservative gain from Labour		Swing	▲12.3	

=== Compton ===
Location of Compton ward

Compton 2021
Party	Candidate	Votes	%	±%
Conservative	Charlotte Carlyle	2,060	51.1	▲2.1
Labour	Tom Briars-Delve	1,476	36.6	▲8.1
Green	Ewan Melling Flavell	264	6.5	▼1.8
Liberal Democrats	Richard Bray	199	4.9	▼2.0
TUSC	Ava Keeling	34	0.8	▼1.3
Majority		584	14.5	▼6.0
Turnout		4,033	42.9	
Conservative gain from Independent		Swing	▼3.0	

=== Devonport ===
Location of Devonport ward

Devonport 2021
Party	Candidate	Votes	%	±%
Labour	Charlotte Cree	1,328	40.9	▼5.3
Conservative	Kyle Lewis	1,245	38.4	▲16.3
Independent	Karen Pilkington	367	11.3	N/A
Green	Andrew Pratt	176	5.4	▲1.8
Liberal Democrats	Jeffrey Hall	107	3.3	▲0.1
TUSC	Lesley Duncan	23	0.7	▼0.6
Majority		83	2.6	▼21.5
Turnout		3,246	28.9	
Labour hold		Swing	▼10.8	

=== Efford and Lipson ===
Location of Efford and Lipson ward

Efford and Lipson 2021
Party	Candidate	Votes	%	±%
Labour	Brian Vincent*	1,714	52.1	▼8.6
Conservative	Gregg Black	1,189	36.2	▲16.8
Green	Pat Bushell	239	7.3	N/A
Liberal Democrats	Alex Primmer	102	3.1	▼0.7
TUSC	Sioned Freer	45	1.4	▼3.1
Majority		525	16.0	▼25.3
Turnout		3,289	32.6	
Labour hold		Swing	▼12.7	

=== Eggbuckland ===
Location of Eggbuckland ward

Eggbuckland 2021
Party	Candidate	Votes	%	±%
Conservative	James Stoneman	2,433	65.2	▲24.2
Labour Co-op	Andrew Wade	871	23.3	▼4.2
Liberal Democrats	Richard Simpson	222	5.9	▲2.6
Green	Bran Malloch	206	5.5	▲3.2
Majority		1,562	41.9	N/A
Turnout		3,732	36.5	
Conservative gain from Independent		Swing	▲14.2 (Note: Swing from Labour)	

=== Ham ===
Location of Ham ward

Ham 2021
Party	Candidate	Votes	%	±%
Conservative	Stephen Hulme	1,502	48.3	▲27.4
Labour Co-op	Tina Tuohy*	1,217	39.2	▼5.8
Active For Plymouth	Jason Shopland	195	6.3	N/A
Green	Caroline Bennett	157	5.1	N/A
TUSC	Samuel Grotzke	37	1.2	▼1.0
Majority		285	9.2	N/A
Turnout		3,108	30.1	
Conservative gain from Labour		Swing	▲16.6	

=== Honicknowle ===
Location of Honicknowle ward

Honicknowle 2021
Party	Candidate	Votes	%	±%
Conservative	Philip Partridge	1,466	50.5	▲30.1
Labour	Pete Smith*	1,232	42.4	▲0.1
Green	Benjamin Osborn	164	5.6	N/A
TUSC	Toby Kavanaugh	42	1.4	▲0.5
Majority		234	8.1	N/A
Turnout		2,904	27.9	
Conservative gain from Labour		Swing	▲15.0	

=== Moor View ===
Location of Moor View ward

Moor View 2021
Party	Candidate	Votes	%	±%
Conservative	Shannon Burden	2,530	63.5	▲28.8
Labour	Chris Mavin*	1,170	29.4	▼7.9
Green	Elizabeth Lowes	173	4.3	N/A
Liberal Democrats	Jim Spencer	91	2.3	▼1.6
Independent	Edison Notman	19	0.5	N/A
Majority		1,360	34.1	N/A
Turnout		3,983	38.5	
Conservative gain from Labour		Swing	▲18.4	

=== Peverell ===
Location of Peverell ward

Peverell 2021
Party	Candidate	Votes	%	±%
Conservative	John Mahony	2,225	44.9	▲2.7
Labour Co-op	Francesca Rees	2,115	42.7	▲7.7
Green	Nicholas Casley	334	6.7	▲1.8
Independent	Darren Denslow	209	4.2	N/A
Heritage	Bernard Toolan	38	0.8	N/A
TUSC	Louise Alldridge	29	0.6	▲0.5
Majority		110	2.2	▼4.9
Turnout		4,950	48.1	
Conservative gain from Independent		Swing	▼2.5	

=== Plympton Chaddlewood ===
Location of Plympton Chaddlewood ward

Plympton Chaddlewood 2021
Party	Candidate	Votes	%	±%
Conservative	Dan Collins	1,111	47.6	▼2.6
Green	Ian Poyser	1,010	43.2	N/A
Labour Co-op	Paul McNamara	215	9.2	▼14.6
Majority		101	4.3	▼21.8
Turnout		2,336	37.2	
Conservative hold		Swing	N/A	

=== Plympton Erle ===
Location of Plympton Erle ward

Plympton Erle 2021
Party	Candidate	Votes	%	±%
Conservative	Andrea Loveridge*	1,526	59.2	▲10.6
Labour	Roger Williams	400	15.5	▼16.6
Independent	Andrew Hill	374	14.5	N/A
Green	Sam Down	146	5.7	N/A
Liberal Democrats	Dennis Draper	74	2.9	▼2.8
Independent	Deanna Yates	56	2.2	N/A
Majority		1,126	43.7	▲27.3
Turnout		2,576	37.8	
Conservative hold		Swing	▲13.6	

=== Plympton St Mary ===
Location of Plympton St Mary ward

Plympton St Mary 2021
Party	Candidate	Votes	%	±%
Conservative	Natalie Harrison	2,984	73.7	▲5.7
Labour	Christopher Cuddihee	609	15.0	▼10.9
Green	Claire Riley	277	6.8	N/A
Liberal Democrats	Sarah Worrall	146	3.6	N/A
TUSC	Laurie Moore	33	0.8	▼5.3
Majority		2,376	58.7	▲16.6
Turnout		4,048	40.1	
Conservative hold		Swing	▲8.4	

=== Plymstock Dunstone ===
Location of Plymstock Dunstone ward

Plymstock Dunstone 2021
Party	Candidate	Votes	%	±%
Conservative	David Salmon	2,420	56.9	▲11.8
Labour	John Stephens	1,317	31.0	▲14.4
Liberal Democrats	Richard Worrall	460	10.8	▲3.6
TUSC	Duncan Moore	55	1.3	▼0.5
Majority		1,103	25.9	▲10.1
Turnout		4,252	41.9	
Conservative hold		Swing	▼1.3	

=== Plymstock Radford ===
Location of Plymstock Radford ward

Plymstock Radford 2021
Party	Candidate	Votes	%	±%
Conservative	Bill Wakeham	2,464	58.7	▲17.7
Labour Co-op	Jan Millar	1,116	26.6	▲7.7
Green	Matthew Faith	382	9.1	▲4.7
Liberal Democrats	Roy Plumley	238	5.7	▲1.2
Majority		1,348	32.1	▲21.7
Turnout		4,200	37.7	
Conservative hold		Swing	▲5.0	

=== Southway ===
Location of Southway ward

Southway 2021
Party	Candidate	Votes	%	±%
Conservative	Richard Bingley	1,750	49.0	▲15.5
Labour	Liz Nicolls	984	27.6	▼8.5
Independent	Sonia-Maria Hosking	305	8.5	N/A
Independent	Emily Quick	273	7.6	N/A
Green	Brian Lewis	133	3.7	▲1.5
Liberal Democrats	Katie McManus	105	2.9	▲1.7
TUSC	Benjamin Davy	20	0.6	▼0.2
Majority		766	21.5	N/A
Turnout		3,570	35.1	
Conservative gain from Labour		Swing	▲12.0	

=== St Budeaux ===
Location of St Budeaux ward

St Budeaux 2021
Party	Candidate	Votes	%	±%
Conservative	Pat Patel	1,691	53.0	▲31.4
Labour	Darren Winter*	1,131	35.4	▼7.4
Green	Leesa Alderton	185	5.8	▲2.9
Active For Plymouth	Ben Crofty	144	4.5	N/A
TUSC	Andrew White	42	1.3	▲0.3
Majority		560	17.5	N/A
Turnout		3,193	33.3	
Conservative gain from Labour		Swing	▲19.4	

=== St Peter and the Waterfront ===
Location of St Peter and the Waterfront ward

St Peter and the Waterfront 2021
Party	Candidate	Votes	%	±%
Labour Co-op	Ian Tuffin*	1,548	41.7	▲0.4
Conservative	Jon Hill	1,446	38.1	▲10.5
Green	James Ellwood	376	9.9	▲3.1
Liberal Democrats	Hugh Janes	181	4.8	▼0.9
Independent	Danny Bamping	140	3.7	N/A
TUSC	Ryan Aldred	73	1.9	▼0.2
Majority		138	3.6	▼10.1
Turnout		3,800	31.0	
Labour hold		Swing	▼5.1	

=== Stoke ===
Location of Stoke ward

Stoke 2021
Party	Candidate	Votes	%	±%
Labour	Sally Cresswell	1,813	49.8	▲0.3
Conservative	Bob Hannaford	1,333	36.6	▲7.6
Green	Frank Hartkopf	262	7.2	N/A
Liberal Democrats	Jacqueline Spencer	117	3.2	▼3.1
Active For Plymouth	Iuliu Popescu	85	2.3	N/A
TUSC	Nik Brooks	32	0.9	N/A
Majority		480	13.2	▼7.3
Turnout		3,642	36.2	
Labour hold		Swing	▼3.7	

=== Sutton and Mount Gould ===
Location of Sutton and Mount Gould ward

Sutton and Mount Gould 2021
Party	Candidate	Votes	%	±%
Labour	Eddie Rennie*	1,715	51.5	▲2.7
Conservative	Grace Stickland	1,106	33.2	▲12.9
Green	Michael Kewish	431	12.9	▲7.2
TUSC	Samuel Hey	77	2.3	N/A
Majority		609	18.3	▼10.2
Turnout		3,329	32.9	
Labour hold		Swing	▼5.1	

== Aftermath ==
On the night of the results, Tudor Evans, the leader of the council and the Labour group, said his party "had their backsides kicked", and that he would "find out what the voters were telling us, what they want to see different and make sure we do change". The Conservative group leader Nick Kelly said he was "absolutely ecstatic" with the results. The Green Party saw their best ever result in Plymouth, falling only 101 votes short in Plympton Chaddlewood.

The council was left in no overall control, with neither party holding a majority of the seats and the balance of power falling to the seven independent councillors. Of the independent councillors, five were former Conservatives who left the party over Kelly's leadership and two former Labour councillors. Kelly said on 11 May that he had contacted former Conservative councillors to seek their support. Evans said that Kelly's success in the election gave him the "right to make the first move" in seeking to control the council, and that Labour wouldn't seek independent support.

Kevin Neil, an independent councillor who was suspended from the Labour Party in 2019, said he would constructively oppose a new administration. The former Conservative councillors Andrea Johnson and Kathy Watkin asked to be readmitted to the Conservative group "in the spirit of how the city voted", while the remaining three former Conservatives refused to commit to signing a proposed confidence and supply agreement due to its lack of detail, saying they would instead "vote on issues on their merits".
