= 1995 Plymouth City Council election =

1995 UK local government election

← 1991	4 May 1995	1997 →

All 60 seats in the Plymouth City Council 31 seats needed for a majority
	First party	Second party
Party	Labour	Conservative
Last election	41 seats, 44.1%	19 seats, 33.2%
Seats won	54	6
Seat change	▲14	▼14
Popular vote	45,291	19,533
Percentage	60.7%	26.2%
Swing	▲17.1%	▼6.8%
- Map showing the results of the 1995 Plymouth City Council elections.
Council control before election
Labour
Council control after election
Labour

The 1995 Plymouth City Council election took place on 4 May 1995 to elect members of Plymouth City Council in Devon, England. This was on the same day as other local elections. The Labour Party retained control of the council, which it had gained from the Conservative Party at the previous election in 1991.

== Overall results ==
1995 Plymouth City Council Election
Party	Seats	Gains	Losses	Net gain/loss	Seats %	Votes %	Votes	+/−
Labour	54	15	1	▲14	90.0	60.7	45,291	▲16.9
Conservative	6	1	15	▼14	10.0	26.2	19,533	▼7.3
Liberal Democrats	0	0	0	Steady	0.0	8.1	6,016	▼8.6
SDP	0	0	0	Steady	0.0	1.4	1,041	▼4.7
Ind. Conservative	0	0	0	Steady	0.0	1.7	1,267	New
UKIP	0	0	0	Steady	0.0	0.8	599	New
Independent	0	0	0	Steady	0.0	0.5	380	New
Green	0	0	0	Steady	0.0	0.4	335	New
NLP	0	0	0	Steady	0.0	0.2	155	New
Total	60						74,617	

== Ward results ==
=== Budshead (3 seats) ===
Location of Budshead ward

Budshead (3 seats)
Party	Candidate	Votes	%
Labour	Ronald Sydney Simmonds	2,606	
Labour	Thomas Barry Coleman	2,490	
Labour	A. Lemin	2,393	
SDP	S. Kimpton	350	
Conservative	L. Butler	341	
SDP	A. Morrison	322	
SDP	P. Stanner	248	
Turnout			36.3%
Labour hold			
Labour hold			
Labour hold			

=== Compton (3 seats) ===
Location of Compton ward

Compton (3 seats)
Party	Candidate	Votes	%
Conservative	Thomas Edward James Savery	1,546	
Conservative	P. Wood	1,530	
Conservative	Albert Fry	1,527	
Labour	P. Ingham	1,184	
Labour	L. Finn	1,149	
Labour	R. Wilson	1,073	
Liberal Democrats	G. Airey	789	
Liberal Democrats	R. Bray	753	
Liberal Democrats	J. Rushton	703	
Turnout			42.3%
Conservative hold			
Conservative hold			
Conservative hold			

=== Drake (3 seats) ===
Location of Drake ward

Drake (3 seats)
Party	Candidate	Votes	%
Labour	Christopher Peter Burgess	1,874	
Labour	Ernest Alexander Colley	1,858	
Labour	Pauline Mary Purnell	1,848	
Conservative	M. White	974	
Conservative	E. Dawson	963	
Conservative	J. Paton	917	
Liberal Democrats	B. Yardley	620	
Liberal Democrats	D. Van Eetvelt	566	
Turnout			36.0%
Labour gain from Conservative			
Labour hold			
Labour hold			

=== Efford (3 seats) ===
Location of Efford ward

Efford (3 seats)
Party	Candidate	Votes	%
Labour	I. Tuffin	2,640	
Labour	Bernard Claude Alexander Miller	2,390	
Labour	J. Bannerman-Jones	2,089	
Conservative	M. Orchard	726	
Conservative	K. Banks	656	
Conservative	K. Banks	648	
Turnout			39.8%
Labour hold			
Labour hold			
Labour hold			

=== Eggbuckland (3 seats) ===
Location of Eggbuckland ward

Eggbuckland (3 seats)
Party	Candidate	Votes	%
Labour	Derick Brian Bray	3,080	
Labour	Michael George Wright	2,976	
Labour	Robert Anthony Gachagan	2,818	
Conservative	B. Robbins	916	
Conservative	L. Bowyer	894	
Conservative	G. Horler	881	
Turnout			41.5%
Labour hold			
Labour hold			
Labour hold			

=== Estover (3 seats) ===
Location of Estover ward

Estover (3 seats)
Party	Candidate	Votes	%
Labour	Michael Robert Fox	2,985	
Labour	Charles Joseph William Demuth	2,945	
Labour	B. Brotherton	2,830	
Conservative	T. Jones	1,623	
Conservative	J. Plymsol	1,573	
Conservative	V. Williams	1,526	
Ind. Conservative	G. Thomas	672	
Turnout			42.8%
Labour gain from Conservative			
Labour gain from Conservative			
Labour gain from Conservative			

=== Ham (3 seats) ===
Location of Ham ward

Ham (3 seats)
Party	Candidate	Votes	%
Labour	B. Rider	2,316	
Labour	Tudor Evans	2,142	
Labour	D. Knott	2,037	
Conservative	D. Mitchell	424	
SDP	M. Bromley	405	
SDP	P. Stanner	377	
Turnout			38.2%
Labour hold			
Labour hold			
Labour hold			

=== Honicknowle (3 seats) ===
Location of Honicknowle ward

Honicknowle (3 seats)
Party	Candidate	Votes	%
Labour	John Joseph Ingham	3,131	
Labour	A. Bennett	2,847	
Labour	Alan George Ford	2,819	
Conservative	R. Braddon	639	
Turnout			40.5%
Labour hold			
Labour hold			
Labour hold			

=== Keyham (3 seats) ===
Location of Keyham ward

Keyham (3 seats)
Party	Candidate	Votes	%
Labour	D. Connelly	2,081	
Labour	Michael John Sheaff	2,047	
Labour	Alan Stephens	1,978	
Conservative	J. Johnson	493	
SDP	M. Mound	286	
SDP	S. Mound	286	
SDP	D. Mound	282	
Turnout			36.0%
Labour hold			
Labour hold			
Labour hold			

=== Mount Gould (3 seats) ===
Location of Mount Gould ward

Mount Gould (3 seats)
Party	Candidate	Votes	%
Labour	C. Roche	1,845	
Labour	Patrica Nora Coyle	1,827	
Labour	John Gerard Williams	1,744	
Conservative	M. Campbell	718	
Conservative	J. Hendley	658	
Conservative	R. Jillard	650	
Turnout			34.2%
Labour hold			
Labour hold			
Labour hold			

=== Plympton Erle (3 seats) ===
Location of Plympton Erle ward

Plympton Erle (3 seats)
Party	Candidate	Votes	%
Labour	R. Burns	1,808	
Labour	V. Burns	1,786	
Labour	R. Rogers	1,699	
Liberal Democrats	K. Hill	1,551	
Liberal Democrats	M. Fletcher	1,301	
Liberal Democrats	M. Neale	1,292	
Conservative	J. Fox	1,267	
Conservative	D. James	1,241	
Conservative	S. Burgon	1,211	
Turnout			37.0%
Labour gain from Conservative			
Labour gain from Conservative			
Labour gain from Conservative			

=== Plympton St Mary (3 seats) ===
Location of Plympton St Mary ward

Plympton St Mary (3 seats)
Party	Candidate	Votes	%
Labour	P. Smith	1,666	
Labour	G. Shears	1,568	
Conservative	Joan Iris Stopporton	1,558	
Conservative	P. Nicholson	1,502	
Labour	B. Vincent	1,482	
Conservative	J. Preece	1,316	
Liberal Democrats	C. Rendle	1,073	
Liberal Democrats	R. Mitchell	1,037	
Liberal Democrats	D. Tyrie	963	
Turnout			45.6%
Labour gain from Conservative			
Labour gain from Conservative			
Conservative hold			

=== Plymstock Dunstone (3 seats) ===
Location of Plymstock Dunstone ward

Plymstock Dunstone (3 seats)
Party	Candidate	Votes	%
Conservative	D. Dicker	2,011	
Labour	J. Kirk	1,932	
Labour	R. Evans	1,912	
Conservative	D. Viney	1,905	
Labour	G. Priest-Jones	1,791	
Conservative	K. Wigens	1,688	
Liberal Democrats	M. Coker	914	
Liberal Democrats	J. Byatt	773	
UKIP	W. Wonnacott	367	
Turnout			45.9%
Conservative hold			
Labour gain from Conservative			
Labour gain from Conservative			

=== Plymstock Radford (3 seats) ===
Location of Plymstock Radford ward

Plymstock Radford (3 seats)
Party	Candidate	Votes	%
Labour	Ruth Earl	1,887	
Labour	Peter Francis Allan	1,838	
Labour	S. Polkinghorne	1,748	
Conservative	I. Bowyer	1,207	
Conservative	V. Pengelly	1,011	
Conservative	M. Leaves	862	
Liberal Democrats	C. Burrows	629	
Ind. Conservative	F. Brimacombe	595	
Ind. Conservative	G. Horwell	427	
UKIP	R. Bullock	232	
Turnout			45.9%
Labour gain from Conservative			
Labour gain from Conservative			
Labour gain from Conservative			

=== Southway (3 seats) ===
Location of Southway ward

Southway (3 seats)
Party	Candidate	Votes	%
Labour	W. Ainsworth	2,801	
Labour	Dennis John Camp	2,491	
Labour	John George Jones	2,397	
Conservative	S. Jones	700	
Turnout			36.9%
Labour hold			
Labour hold			
Labour hold			

=== St Budeax (3 seats) ===
Location of St Budeax ward

St Budeax (3 seats)
Party	Candidate	Votes	%
Labour	J. Payne	2,576	
Labour	John Ambrose Coyle	2,369	
Labour	Debre Ann Roche	2,196	
Conservative	E. Price	781	
Conservative	E. Slaughter	566	
Turnout			37.5%
Labour hold			
Labour hold			
Labour hold			

=== St Peter (3 seats) ===
Location of St Peter ward

St Peter (3 seats)
Party	Candidate	Votes	%
Labour	Sylvia Yvonne Bellamy	2,051	
Labour	E. Cohen	1,893	
Labour	B. Gilroy	1,527	
Liberal Democrats	J. Dean	440	
Independent	J. King	380	
Conservative	J. Mahony	341	
Conservative	D. Gamble	328	
Conservative	M. Turner	313	
Turnout			35.0%
Labour hold			
Labour hold			
Labour hold			

=== Stoke (3 seats) ===
Location of Stoke ward

Stoke (3 seats)
Party	Candidate	Votes	%
Labour	David Alexander Millar	2,350	
Labour	Janet Millar	2,303	
Labour	T. Martin	2,247	
Conservative	J. Parry	1,008	
Conservative	J. Mahony	962	
Conservative	A. Romilly	850	
Green	D. Nolan	335	
NLP	F. Lyons	155	
Turnout			39.4%
Labour hold			
Labour hold			
Labour hold			

=== Sutton (3 seats) ===
Location of Sutton ward

Sutton (3 seats)
Party	Candidate	Votes	%
Labour	Jean Nelder	2,190	
Labour	George Wheeler	2,123	
Labour	Christopher Mavin	2,085	
Conservative	F. Brimacombe	746	
Conservative	P. Higgs	654	
Conservative	A. Coombes	620	
Turnout			37.4%
Labour hold			
Labour hold			
Labour hold			

=== Trelawny (3 seats) ===
Location of Trelawny ward

Trelawny (3 seats)
Party	Candidate	Votes	%
Labour	Howard Leslie Davey	2,288	
Labour	Thelma Hilda Irene Rider	2,224	
Conservative	P. Nicholson	1,514	
Conservative	D. Kaye	1,394	
Conservative	R. Lloyd	1,371	
Turnout			52.1%
Labour hold			
Labour hold			
Conservative gain from Labour			
