= 2019 Plymouth City Council election =

2019 local election in Plymouth

← 2018	2 May 2019	2021 →

19 of the 57 seats to Plymouth City Council 29 seats needed for a majority
	First party	Second party	Third party
Leader	Tudor Evans	Ian Bowyer	None
Party	Labour	Conservative	Independent
Leader's seat	Ham	Eggbuckland
Last election	31	26	0
Seats before	30	26	1
Seats won	10	9	0
Seats after	31	25	1
Seat change	▲1	▼1	Steady
Popular vote	23,392	23,076	1,156
Percentage	37.4%	36.9%	1.8%
- Map showing the results of contested wards in the 2019 Plymouth City Council elections.
Council control before election
Labour
Council control after election
Labour

The 2019 Plymouth City Council election was held on 2 May 2019 to elect members of Plymouth City Council in England.

The Labour Party took control of the council after the 2018 election, with thirty-one members and a working majority. Labour defended nine seats, and the Conservatives defended ten. Labour won the election, winning ten of the nineteen seats up for election, with the Conservatives winning the other nine.

== Background ==
Plymouth City Council held local elections on 2 May 2019 along with councils across England and Northern Ireland as part of the UK 2019 local elections. The council elects its councillors in thirds, with a third being up for election every year for three years, with no election each fourth year to correspond with councillors' four-year terms. Councillors defending their seats in this election were previously elected in 2015. In that election, ten Conservative candidates and nine Labour candidates were elected.

Following the 2018 Plymouth City Council election, the council has been controlled by the Labour Party, initially with thirty-one councillors.

Labour held its seat in a subsequent by-election in Stoke ward, which took place in July 2018. As the councillor who stood down was elected in the same cycle as 2019, Jemima Laing, the winner of the by-election, was the incumbent up for re-election. Kevin Neil, who was elected in 2018, was suspended from the Labour Party when a police investigation was launched into him. He continues to sit as an independent following the closure of the police investigation, pending an internal investigation by the party.

Labour and the Conservatives contested all nineteen seats up for election, whilst the Liberal Democrats stood seventeen candidates and the UK Independence Party stood twelve.

== Overall results ==
After 2018 election		Before 2019 election		After 2019 election	
Party	Seats	Party	Seats	Party	Seats
Labour	31	Labour	30	Labour	31
Conservative	26	Conservative	26	Conservative	25
Independent	0	Independent	1	Independent	1

2019 Plymouth City Council election
Party	This election			Full council			This election		
Party	Seats	Net	Seats %	Other	Total	Total %	Votes	Votes %	+/−
Labour	10	▲1	52.6	21	31	54.4	23,392	37.4	–6.6
Conservative	9	▼1	47.4	16	25	43.9	23,076	36.9	–7.8
Independent	0	Steady	0.0	1	1	1.7	1,156	1.8	+1.3
UKIP	0	Steady	0.0	0	0	0.0	7,072	11.3	–8.6
Liberal Democrats	0	Steady	0.0	0	0	0.0	4,416	7.0	+3.6
Green	0	Steady	0.0	0	0	0.0	2,416	3.9	–2.3
Active for Plymouth	0	Steady	0.0	0	0	0.0	779	1.2	New
Socialist Alternative	0	Steady	0.0	0	0	0.0	346	0.6	New
Vivamus	0	Steady	0.0	0	0	0.0	20	0.1	±0.0

Note: All changes in vote share are in comparison to the corresponding 2015 election.

== Ward results ==
Asterisks denote sitting councillors seeking re-election.

=== Budshead ===
Location of Budshead ward

Budshead 2019
Party	Candidate	Votes	%	±%
Conservative	Jonathan Drean*	1,547	47.0	▲5.8
Labour	Charlotte Cree	1,081	32.9	▲2.9
UKIP	John McCarthy	504	15.3	▼5.6
Active For Plymouth	Stephen Minns	157	4.8	N/A
Majority		466	14.2	▲3.0
Turnout		3,289		
Conservative hold		Swing	▲1.5	

=== Compton ===
Location of Compton ward

Compton 2019
Party	Candidate	Votes	%	±%
Conservative	Nick Kelly	1,497	40.7	▼3.7
Labour	Liz Nicolls	1,352	36.7	▲9.2
UKIP	Michael Snelling	460	12.5	▼1.3
Liberal Democrats	Stuart Spicer	373	10.1	▲4.3
Majority		145	3.9	▼13.0
Turnout		3,682		
Conservative hold		Swing	▼6.5	

=== Devonport ===
Location of Devonport ward

Devonport 2019
Party	Candidate	Votes	%	±%
Labour	Mark Coker*	1,438	46.3	▲6.3
Conservative	Sandy Borthwick	630	20.3	▼7.4
UKIP	Richard Ellison	628	20.2	▼0.7
Green	Andy Pratt	238	7.7	▲1.7
Liberal Democrats	Fleur Ball	169	5.4	▲1.2
Majority		808	26.0	▲13.3
Turnout		3,103		
Labour hold		Swing	▲6.7	

=== Drake ===
Location of Drake ward

Drake 2019
Party	Candidate	Votes	%	±%
Labour	Chaz Singh*	859	44.7	▲6.4
Independent	Steve Ricketts	846	44.0	N/A
Conservative	Mark Thompson	102	5.3	▼23.3
Liberal Democrats	Jeffrey Hall	90	4.7	▼0.5
Active For Plymouth	Jules Popescu	26	1.4	N/A
Majority		13	0.7	▼9.0
Turnout		1,923		
Labour hold		Swing	N/A	

=== Efford and Lipson ===
Location of Efford and Lipson ward

Efford and Lipson 2019
Party	Candidate	Votes	%	±%
Labour	Pauline Murphy*	1,714	54.4	▲13.2
UKIP	Stephen Austin	612	19.4	▼0.5
Conservative	Brett Carr	583	18.5	▼6.9
Liberal Democrats	Alex Primmer	243	7.7	▲3.7
Majority		1,102	35.0	▲19.2
Turnout		3,152		
Labour hold		Swing	▲6.8	

=== Eggbuckland ===
Location of Eggbuckland ward

Eggbuckland 2019
Party	Candidate	Votes	%	±%
Conservative	Lynda Bowyer*	1,893	52.8	▲4.8
Labour Co-op	John Petrie	808	22.5	▼3.4
UKIP	Wendy Noble	660	18.4	▼2.0
Liberal Democrats	Richard Simpson	227	6.3	N/A
Majority		1,085	30.2	▲8.1
Turnout		3,588		
Conservative hold		Swing	▲4.1	

=== Ham ===
Location of Ham ward

Ham 2019
Party	Candidate	Votes	%	±%
Labour Co-op	Tudor Evans*	1,441	45.9	▲7.3
UKIP	Michael Arthur	633	20.2	▼6.6
Conservative	Tim Blazevic	605	19.3	▼6.7
Active For Plymouth	Jason Shopland	287	9.1	N/A
Liberal Democrats	Mike Gillbard	157	5.0	▲0.6
Socialist Alternative	Nik Brookson	16	0.5	N/A
Majority		808	25.7	▲14.5
Turnout		3,139		
Labour hold		Swing	▲7.0	

=== Honicknowle ===
Location of Honicknowle ward

Honicknowle 2019
Party	Candidate	Votes	%	±%
Labour Co-op	Mark Lowry*	1,499	48.8	▲7.1
UKIP	Ivor Lucas	747	24.3	▼5.4
Conservative	Nikki Bale	642	20.9	▲2.8
Liberal Democrats	Lloyd Jones	121	3.9	N/A
Socialist Alternative	Samuel Taylor-Wickenden	61	2.0	N/A
Majority		752	24.5	▲12.5
Turnout		3,070		
Labour hold		Swing	▲6.3	

=== Moor View ===
Location of Moor View ward

Moor View 2019
Party	Candidate	Votes	%	±%
Conservative	John Riley	1,311	36.9	▲1.4
Labour	Merika Kindlon	1,233	34.7	▲4.4
UKIP	John Baddeley	670	18.9	▼4.2
Independent	Arthur Watson	171	4.8	N/A
Liberal Democrats	Jim Spencer	168	4.7	▲0.2
Majority		78	2.2	▼5.8
Turnout		3,553		
Conservative hold		Swing	▼2.9	

=== Peverell ===
Location of Peverell ward

Peverell 2019
Party	Candidate	Votes	%	±%
Labour	Sarah Allen	1,902	41.3	▲12.1
Conservative	John Mahony*	1,710	37.1	▼5.8
UKIP	Paul McAuley	385	8.4	▼3.9
Green	Nicholas Casley	355	7.7	▼0.4
Liberal Democrats	Richard Lawrie	233	5.1	▼0.8
Vivamus	Bernard Toolan	20	0.4	▼0.3
Majority		192	4.2	N/A
Turnout		4,605		
Labour gain from Conservative		Swing	▲9.0	

=== Plympton Erle ===
Location of Plympton Erle ward

Plympton Erle 2019
Party	Candidate	Votes	%	±%
Conservative	Terri Beer*	1,468	62.7	▲14.8
Labour Co-op	Andrew Wade	544	23.2	▲3.5
Liberal Democrats	Dennis Draper	330	14.1	▲7.5
Majority		924	39.5	▲11.3
Turnout		2,342		
Conservative hold		Swing	▲5.7	

=== Plympton St Mary ===
Location of Plympton St Mary ward

Plympton St Mary 2019
Party	Candidate	Votes	%	±%
Conservative	Patrick Nicholson*	2,634	72.6	▲13.4
Labour Co-op	Paul McNamara	623	17.2	▲0.1
Liberal Democrats	Thomas Heard	373	10.3	N/A
Majority		2,011	55.4	▲13.8
Turnout		3,630	37.0	
Conservative hold		Swing	▲6.7	

=== Plymstock Dunstone ===
Location of Plymstock Dunstone ward

Plymstock Dunstone 2019
Party	Candidate	Votes	%	±%
Conservative	Nigel Churchill*	1,947	57.6	▲8.9
Labour	Ben Davy	795	23.5	▲7.1
Liberal Democrats	Sima Davarian	636	18.8	▲12.6
Majority		1,152	34.1	▲10.6
Turnout		3,378	36.0	
Conservative hold		Swing	▲0.9	

=== Plymstock Radford ===
Location of Plymstock Radford ward

Plymstock Radford 2019
Party	Candidate	Votes	%	±%
Conservative	Kathy Watkin	1,866	50.0	▲0.7
Labour	Baz Ahmed	853	22.9	▼0.2
Green	Matthew Faith	594	15.9	N/A
Liberal Democrats	Roy Plumley	419	11.2	N/A
Majority		1,013	27.1	▲3.6
Turnout		3,732	35.6	
Conservative hold		Swing	▲0.5	

=== Southway ===
Location of Southway ward

Southway 2019
Party	Candidate	Votes	%	±%
Conservative	Mark Deacon*	1,423	40.7	▲5.8
Labour	Sally Cresswell	1,314	37.6	▲4.0
UKIP	William Bertram	563	16.1	▼6.5
Liberal Democrats	Jacqui Spencer	198	5.7	N/A
Majority		109	3.1	▲1.8
Turnout		3,498	35.5	
Conservative hold		Swing	▲0.9	

=== St Budeaux ===
Location of St Budeaux ward

St Budeaux 2019
Party	Candidate	Votes	%	±%
Labour	George Wheeler*	1,181	40.0	▲1.0
Conservative	Pat Patel	985	33.4	▲5.3
UKIP	Ross Horton	680	23.1	▼4.1
Socialist Alternative	Andrew White	103	3.5	N/A
Majority		196	6.6	▼4.3
Turnout		2,949	30.9	
Labour hold		Swing	▼2.2	

=== St Peter and the Waterfront ===
Location of St Peter and the Waterfront ward

St Peter and the Waterfront 2019
Party	Candidate	Votes	%	±%
Labour Co-op	Chris Penberthy*	1,528	43.5	▲7.9
Conservative	Shannon Burden	697	19.8	▼8.8
UKIP	Hugh Davies	530	15.1	▼0.5
Green	James Ellwood	355	10.1	▼1.5
Liberal Democrats	Hugh Janes	219	6.2	▲1.0
Independent	Tim Francis	139	4.0	N/A
Socialist Alternative	Ryan Aldred	47	1.3	N/A
Majority		831	23.6	▲16.6
Turnout		3,515	30.2	
Labour hold		Swing	▲8.3	

=== Stoke ===
Location of Stoke ward

Stoke 2019
Party	Candidate	Votes	%	±%
Labour	Jemima Laing*	1,544	47.1	
Conservative	Chip Tofan	866	26.4	
Green	Ian Poyser	434	13.2	
Liberal Democrats	Connor Clarke	227	6.9	
Active For Plymouth	Alina Zanosche	206	6.3	
Majority		678	20.7	
Turnout		3,277	33.2	
Labour hold		Swing		

=== Sutton and Mount Gould ===
Location of Sutton and Mount Gould ward

Sutton and Mount Gould 2019
Party	Candidate	Votes	%	±%
Labour	Sue Dann*	1,683	53.7	
Conservative	Dan Collins	670	21.4	
Green	Mike Kewish	440	14.0	
Liberal Democrats	Peter York	233	7.1	
Socialist Alternative	Roxy Castell	119	3.8	
Majority		1,013	32.3	
Turnout		3,135	31.7	
Labour hold		Swing		
