= 2014 Plymouth City Council election =

2014 UK local government election

← 2012	22 May 2014	2015 →

19 of the 57 seats to Plymouth City Council 29 seats needed for a majority
	First party	Second party	Third party
Leader	Tudor Evans	Ian Bowyer	None
Party	Labour	Conservative	UKIP
Seats before	31	26	0
Seats won	7	9	3
Seats after	30	24	3
Seat change	▼1	▼2	▲3
Popular vote	20,008	19,664	20,169
Percentage	30.8%	30.3%	31.1%
- Map showing the results of contested positions in the 2014 Plymouth City Council elections.
Council control before election
Labour
Council control after election
Labour

The 2014 Plymouth City Council election took place on 22 May 2014 to elect members of Plymouth City Council in England. This was on the same day as other local elections. The election was won by the Labour Party, who maintained their overall majority. The UK Independence Party gained representation on the council for the first time, and this was the only election in which the party won seats in Plymouth.

== Background ==
Plymouth City Council held local elections on 22 May 2014 as part of the 2014 local elections. The council elects its councillors in thirds, with a third being up for election every year for three years, with no election in the fourth year. Councillors defending their seats in this election were previously elected in 2010. In that election, eleven Conservative candidates and eight Labour candidates were elected. As the previous election had coincided with a general election, sitting councillors were elected with a citywide turnout of 62%.

Ahead of the election, the council was split between the Labour Party and the Conservative Party, with Labour holding a narrow overall majority.

Labour gained a Southway seat in 2013 in a by-election after elected Conservative councillor Tom Browne resigned. As Browne had been elected in 2010, winning Labour councillor Jonny Morris was up for re-election in 2014.

== Overall results ==
2014 Plymouth City Council Election
Party	Seats	Gains	Losses	Net gain/loss	Seats %	Votes %	Votes	+/−
Conservative	9	0	2	▼1	47.4	30.3	19,664	▼5.1
Labour	7	2	3	▼1	36.8	30.8	20,008	▲1.0
UKIP	3	3	0	▲3	15.8	31.1	20,169	▲21.3
Green	0	0	0	Steady	0.0	3.9	2,533	▲1.9
TUSC	0	0	0	Steady	0.0	1.8	1,168	New
Independent	0	0	0	Steady	0.0	1.0	628	▼0.7
Liberal Democrats	0	0	0	Steady	0.0	0.9	597	▼20.0
NHA	0	0	0	Steady	0.0	0.2	158	New
Vivamus	0	0	0	Steady	0.0	0.0	21	New
Total	19						57,936	

Note: All changes in vote share are in comparison to the corresponding 2010 election.

The Labour Party kept their majority on the council.

After the previous election, the composition of the council was:

↓
31	26
Labour	Conservative

After this election, the composition of the council was:

↓
30	24	3
Labour	Conservative	UKIP

== Ward results ==
Plymouth City Council maintains records of past election results.

Asterisks denote sitting councillors seeking re-election.

=== Budshead ===
Location of Budshead ward

Budshead 2014
Party	Candidate	Votes	%	±%
Conservative	Dave Downie	1,234	35.1	▼1.1
UKIP	John McCarthy	1,129	32.1	▲21.2
Labour	Linda Crick	1,103	31.4	▼3.7
TUSC	Matthew Radmore	49	1.4	N/A
Majority		105	3.0	▲1.9
Turnout		3,515	38.0	
Conservative hold		Swing	▼11.2	

=== Compton ===
Location of Compton ward

Compton 2014
Party	Candidate	Votes	%	±%
Conservative	Ted Fry*	1,420	39.6	▼2.3
Labour	Paul McNamara	867	24.2	▲3.1
UKIP	David Partridge	818	22.8	▲14.3
Green	Colin Trier	432	12.1	▲7.8
TUSC	James Waghorn	45	1.3	N/A
Majority		553	15.4	▼2.3
Turnout		3,582	42.7	
Conservative hold		Swing	▼2.7	

=== Devonport ===
Location of Devonport ward

Devonport 2014
Party	Candidate	Votes	%	±%
Labour	Bill Stevens*	1,176	36.3	▲0.3
UKIP	Michael Ellison	1,089	33.6	▲22.3
Conservative	Ryan Buckley	566	17.5	▼11.4
Green	Lauren Packham	209	6.5	▲4.0
Liberal Democrats	Richard Bray	146	4.5	▼16.7
TUSC	Lesley Duncan	53	1.6	N/A
Majority		87	2.7	▼4.4
Turnout		3,239	33.5	
Labour hold		Swing	▼11.0	

=== Drake ===
Location of Drake ward

Drake 2014
Party	Candidate	Votes	%	±%
Conservative	Steve Ricketts*	722	44.2	▲9.6
Labour	Dena Rafati	430	26.3	▲4.8
Green	Tom Pashby	238	14.6	▲8.6
UKIP	David Partridge	143	8.8	▲3.2
Liberal Democrats	Peter York	65	4.0	▼25.2
TUSC	George Fidler	28	1.7	N/A
Independent	Diane Jasper-Eustis	6	0.4	N/A
Majority		298	17.9	▲12.5
Turnout		1,632	25.2	
Conservative hold		Swing	▲2.4	

=== Efford and Lipson ===
Location of Efford and Lipson ward

Efford and Lipson 2014
Party	Candidate	Votes	%	±%
Labour	Neil Hendy	1,291	39.6	▲6.4
UKIP	Grace Stickland	1,061	32.5	▲21.6
Conservative	David Fletcher	549	16.8	▼6.8
Green	Gwen Buck	287	8.8	▲3.1
TUSC	Steve Merritt	72	2.2	N/A
Majority		230	7.1	▼2.5
Turnout		3,260	34.8	
Labour hold		Swing	▼7.6	

=== Eggbuckland ===
Location of Eggbuckland ward

Eggbuckland 2014
Party	Candidate	Votes	%	±%
Conservative	Ian Bowyer*	1,810	42.8	▲4.1
UKIP	Bill Wakeham	1,231	29.1	▲20.1
Labour	Janet Denise	1,129	26.7	▼1.6
TUSC	Tom Sloman	56	1.3	N/A
Majority		579	13.7	▲3.3
Turnout		4,226	41.5	
Conservative hold		Swing	▼8.0	

=== Ham ===
Location of Ham ward

Ham 2014
Party	Candidate	Votes	%	±%
UKIP	Christopher Storer	1,239	39.8	▲27.0
Labour	Ian Gordon*	1,187	38.1	▼2.2
Conservative	Mark Wilcox	596	19.1	▼6.6
TUSC	Ryan Aldred	93	3.0	N/A
Majority		52	1.7	N/A
Turnout		3,115	33.7	
UKIP gain from Labour		Swing	▲14.6	

=== Honicknowle ===
Location of Honicknowle ward

Honicknowle 2014
Party	Candidate	Votes	%	±%
UKIP	John Riley	1,610	47.3	▲35.4
Labour	Nicky Williams*	1,238	36.3	▼6.9
Conservative	Dylan Morris	466	13.7	▼9.0
TUSC	John Williams	92	2.7	N/A
Majority		372	11.0	N/A
Turnout		3,406	33.9	
UKIP gain from Labour		Swing	▲21.2	

=== Moor View ===
Location of Moor View ward

Moor View 2014
Party	Candidate	Votes	%	±%
UKIP	Maddi Bridgeman	1,397	39.0	▲29.1
Labour	Mike Wright*	1,269	35.5	▼1.3
Conservative	Mike Foster	875	24.4	▼15.6
TUSC	Keith Low	38	1.1	N/A
Majority		128	3.5	N/A
Turnout		3,579	39.6	
UKIP gain from Labour		Swing	▲15.2	

=== Peverell ===
Location of Peverell ward

Peverell 2014
Party	Candidate	Votes	%	±%
Conservative	Martin Leaves*	1,741	39.2	▼0.8
Labour	Mark Thompson	1,264	28.5	▲3.7
UKIP	Peter Brooksbank	805	18.1	▲11.6
Green	Wendy Miller	363	8.2	▲4.4
Liberal Democrats	Richard Lawrie	214	4.8	▼19.8
TUSC	Justin Pollard	32	0.7	N/A
Vivamus	Bernard Toolan	21	0.5	▲0.2
Majority		477	10.7	▼4.5
Turnout		4,440	44.4	
Conservative hold		Swing	▼1.5	

=== Plympton Chaddlewood ===
Location of Plympton Chaddlewood ward

Plympton Chaddlewood 2014
Party	Candidate	Votes	%	±%
Conservative	Glenn Jordan*	764	39.4	▲6.5
UKIP	Jonathan Frost	707	36.4	▲26.5
Labour	John Shillabeer	401	20.7	▲1.0
TUSC	Louise Alldridge	69	3.6	N/A
Majority		57	3.0	▼18.4
Turnout		1,941	31.6	
Conservative hold		Swing	▼10.0	

=== Plympton St Mary ===
Location of Plympton St Mary ward

Plympton St Mary 2014
Party	Candidate	Votes	%	±%
Conservative	David James*	1,938	48.4	▼2.4
UKIP	Peter Endean	1,097	27.4	▲18.4
Labour	Chris Mavin	750	18.7	▼1.4
NHA	Steve Blackburn	158	3.9	N/A
TUSC	Tom Nally	59	1.5	N/A
Majority		841	21.0	▼9.7
Turnout		4,002	39.6	
Conservative hold		Swing	▼10.4	

=== Plymstock Dunstone ===
Location of Plymstock Dunstone ward

Plymstock Dunstone 2014
Party	Candidate	Votes	%	±%
Conservative	Vivien Pengelly*	1,746	43.9	▼4.6
UKIP	David Salmon	1,464	36.8	▲25.8
Labour	Simon Healy	688	17.3	▼0.5
TUSC	Roxy Castell	77	1.9	N/A
Majority		282	7.1	▼18.7
Turnout		3,975	41.9	
Conservative hold		Swing	▼15.2	

=== Plymstock Radford ===
Location of Plymstock Radford ward

Plymstock Radford 2014
Party	Candidate	Votes	%	±%
Conservative	Wendy Foster*	1,521	39.1	▼1.1
UKIP	John Wheeler	1,472	37.9	▲28.7
Labour	Shirley Smith	815	21.0	▲4.6
TUSC	Joe Ellerton	80	2.1	N/A
Majority		49	1.2	▼17.1
Turnout		3,888	40.5	
Conservative hold		Swing	▼14.9	

=== Southway ===
Location of Southway ward

Southway 2014
Party	Candidate	Votes	%	±%
Labour	Jonny Morris*	1,348	34.6	▼1.1
UKIP	Peter Berrow	1,258	32.2	▲21.0
Conservative	Mark Deacon	912	23.4	▼12.7
Independent	Dennis Silverwood	343	8.8	N/A
TUSC	Nik Brookson	34	0.9	N/A
Majority		90	2.3	N/A
Turnout		3,895	34.8	
Labour gain from Conservative		Swing	▼11.1	

=== St Budeaux ===
Location of St Budeaux ward

St Budeaux 2014
Party	Candidate	Votes	%	±%
Labour	Sally Bowie*	1,230	38.9	▼1.8
UKIP	Adam Duffield	1,219	38.5	▲25.8
Conservative	Janet Plymsol	622	19.7	▼6.9
TUSC	Anthony Cockell	94	3.0	N/A
Majority		11	0.3	▼13.8
Turnout		3,165	33.0	
Labour hold		Swing	▼13.8	

=== Stoke ===
Location of Stoke ward

Stoke 2014
Party	Candidate	Votes	%	±%
Labour	Michael Sparling	1,333	36.9	▲5.5
Conservative	Mark Christie	814	22.5	▼11.4
UKIP	Derek Wagstaff	802	22.2	▲13.2
Green	Andrew Pratt	333	9.2	▲5.7
Independent	Jill Dolan	279	7.7	N/A
TUSC	Teresa Stuart	55	1.5	N/A
Majority		519	14.4	N/A
Turnout		3,616	40.0	
Labour gain from Conservative		Swing	▲8.5	

=== St Peter and the Waterfront ===
Location of St Peter and the Waterfront ward

St Peter and the Waterfront 2014
Party	Candidate	Votes	%	±%
Labour	Sue McDonald*	1,199	35.8	▲2.0
UKIP	Roy Kettle	831	24.8	▲16.8
Conservative	Stuart Pilcher	755	22.5	▼8.0
Green	Andy Dale	317	9.5	▲5.7
Liberal Democrats	Hugh Janes	172	5.1	▼16.8
TUSC	Paddy Ryan	79	2.4	N/A
Majority		87	11.0	▲7.7
Turnout		3,353	34.4	
Labour hold		Swing	▼7.4	

=== Sutton and Mount Gould ===
Location of Sutton and Mount Gould ward

Sutton and Mount Gould 2014
Party	Candidate	Votes	%	±%
Labour	Mary Aspinall*	1,290	41.3	▲7.8
UKIP	Jonquil Webber	801	25.7	▲17.5
Conservative	Colin Berry	613	19.6	▼6.6
Green	Holly Rowe	354	11.3	▲6.3
TUSC	Louise Parker	63	2.0	N/A
Majority		489	15.6	▲9.3
Turnout		3,021	36.1	
Labour hold		Swing	▼4.9	

== Aftermath ==
Turnout in this election fell to 37%, compared to 62% when the defending councillors were last elected. Following this election, the Labour group had a majority of councillors. This meant that Labour group leader Tudor Evans remained the leader of Plymouth City Council. The UK Independence Party won seats on the council for the first time, and came second in several seats in the city with close results in St Budeaux and Plymstock Radford wards.
