= 2018 Plymouth City Council election =

2018 local election in Plymouth

← 2016	3 May 2018	2019 →

19 of the 57 seats to Plymouth City Council 29 seats needed for a majority
- Turnout: 35.1%
	First party	Second party
Leader	Tudor Evans	Ian Bowyer
Party	Labour	Conservative
Last election	27	27
Seats before	27	30
Seats won	11	8
Seats after	31	26
Seat change	▲4	▼4
Popular vote	28,554	29,004
Percentage	44.0%	44.7%
- Map showing the results of contested wards in the 2018 Plymouth City Council elections.
Council control before election
Conservative
Council control after election
Labour

The 2018 Plymouth City Council election took place on 3 May 2018 to elect members of Plymouth City Council in England. The election was won by the Labour Party, who gained enough seats to achieve an overall majority and took control of the council.

A coalition of Conservative and UK Independence Party (UKIP) councillors had taken control of the council after the 2016 election, with thirty members in total and a working majority. The three UKIP councillors defected to the Conservative Party in September 2017, giving the Conservatives overall control of the council. The Conservative Party defended twelve seats and Labour defended seven.

== Background ==
Plymouth City Council held local elections on 3 May 2018 along with councils across England as part of the 2018 local elections. The council elects its councillors in thirds, with a third being up for election every year for three years, with no election in the fourth year. Councillors defending their seats in this election were previously elected in 2014. In that election, nine Conservative candidates, seven Labour candidates and three UKIP candidates were elected.

In September 2017, the three councillors elected as UKIP candidates defected to the Conservative Party. Following the 2016 Plymouth City Council election, the council had been controlled by a coalition of Conservative and UKIP councillors, with thirty members between them. Following the defections of the UKIP councillors, the Conservative Party held an overall majority, with thirty councillors compared to Labour's twenty-seven.

The Local Government Chronicle described Labour as 'well placed to regain control' by winning the seats won by UKIP councillors in 2014. Rob Ford in the Guardian wrote that a Labour victory in Plymouth would help the party 'demonstrate strength in critical English swing areas'. The election was the first in which the Liberal Democrats fielded a candidate in every ward in Plymouth since 2010.

== Overall results ==
2018 Plymouth City Council Election
Party	Seats	Gains	Losses	Net gain/loss	Seats %	Votes %	Votes	+/−
Labour	11	4	0	▲4	57.9	44.0	28,554	▲13.2
Conservative	8	0	4	▼4	42.1	44.7	29,005	▲13.9
Liberal Democrats	0	0	0	Steady	0.0	5.3	3,418	▲4.4
UKIP	0	0	0	Steady	0.0	2.1	1,359	▼29.0
Green	0	0	0	Steady	0.0	1.8	1,178	▼2.1
Independent	0	0	0	Steady	0.0	1.6	1,016	▲0.6
TUSC	0	0	0	Steady	0.0	0.5	319	▼1.3
Vivamus	0	0	0	Steady	0.0	0.0	24	0.0
For Britain Movement	0	0	0	Steady	0.0	0.0	24	New

Note: All changes in vote share are in comparison to the corresponding 2014 election.

The Labour Party won an overall majority on the council, with 31 of the council's 57 councillors. The party had last had a majority on the council in 2015. Plymouth was the only council Labour gained control of from the Conservatives in the 2018 local elections.

After the previous election, the composition of the council was:

↓
27	27	3
Labour	Conservative	UKIP

Before this election, the composition of the council was:

↓
27	30
Labour	Conservative

After this election, the composition of the council was:

↓
31	26
Labour	Conservative

== Ward results ==
Asterisks denote sitting councillors seeking re-election.

=== Budshead ===
Location of Budshead ward

Budshead 2018
Party	Candidate	Votes	%	±%
Conservative	Dave Downie*	1,731	51.7	▲16.6
Labour	Jill Narin	1,307	39.0	▲7.6
UKIP	John Smith	188	5.6	▼26.5
Liberal Democrats	Matthew Radmore	122	3.6	N/A
Majority		424	12.7	▲9.7
Turnout		3,348	34.6	▼3.4
Conservative hold		Swing	▲4.5	

=== Compton ===
Location of Compton ward

Compton 2018
Party	Candidate	Votes	%	±%
Conservative	Andrea Johnson	1,935	50.4	▲10.8
Labour Co-op	Paul McNamara	1,507	39.3	▲15.1
Liberal Democrats	Guy Steven	202	5.3	N/A
Green	Graham Epstein	193	5.0	▼7.1
Majority		428	11.2	▼4.2
Turnout		3,837	41.3	▼1.4
Conservative hold		Swing	▼2.2	

=== Devonport ===
Location of Devonport ward

Devonport 2018
Party	Candidate	Votes	%	±%
Labour	Bill Stevens*	1,893	57.2	▲20.9
Conservative	Sandy Borthwick	934	28.2	▲10.7
UKIP	Richard Ellison	159	4.8	▼28.8
Liberal Democrats	Fleur Ball	116	3.5	▼1.0
Green	Andrew Pratt	99	3.0	▼3.5
Independent	Scott Wardle	84	2.5	N/A
TUSC	Roxy Castell	22	0.7	▼0.9
Majority		959	29.0	▲26.3
Turnout		3,307	30.0	▼3.5
Labour hold		Swing	▲5.1	

=== Drake ===
Location of Drake ward

Drake 2018
Party	Candidate	Votes	%	±%
Labour	Margaret Corvid	954	51.8	▲25.5
Conservative	Steve Ricketts*	789	42.8	▼1.4
Liberal Democrats	Charlotte Radmore	76	4.1	▼0.4
For Britain	Iuliu Popescu	24	1.3	N/A
Majority		165	9.0	N/A
Turnout		1,843	29.4	▲4.2
Labour gain from Conservative		Swing	▲13.5	

=== Efford and Lipson ===
Location of Efford and Lipson ward

Efford and Lipson 2018
Party	Candidate	Votes	%	±%
Labour	Neil Hendy*	1,940	60.0	▲20.4
Conservative	Jake Donovan	996	30.8	▲14.0
Green	Benjamin Smith	158	4.9	▼3.9
Liberal Democrats	Alex Primmer	97	3.0	N/A
TUSC	Sam Taylor-Wickenden	40	1.2	▼1.0
Majority		944	29.2	▲22.1
Turnout		3,231	32.3	▼2.5
Labour hold		Swing	▲3.2	

=== Eggbuckland ===
Location of Eggbuckland ward

Eggbuckland 2018
Party	Candidate	Votes	%	±%
Conservative	Ian Bowyer*	2,313	60.8	▲18.0
Labour Co-op	Andrew Wade	1,094	28.8	▲2.1
UKIP	Wendy Noble	220	5.8	▼23.3
Liberal Democrats	Richard Simpson	176	4.6	N/A
Majority		1,219	32.1	▲18.4
Turnout		3,803	37.4	▼4.1
Conservative hold		Swing	▲8.0	

=== Ham ===
Location of Ham ward

Ham 2018
Party	Candidate	Votes	%	±%
Labour	Gareth Derrick	1,914	56.6	▲17.5
Conservative	Chris Storer*	1,129	33.4	▲14.6
UKIP	Alan Skuse	198	5.9	▼33.2
Liberal Democrats	Richard Lawrie	140	4.1	N/A
Majority		785	23.2	N/A
Turnout		3,381	32.9	▼0.8
Labour gain from Conservative		Swing	▲1.5	

=== Honicknowle ===
Location of Honicknowle ward

Honicknowle 2018
Party	Candidate	Votes	%	±%
Labour	Pamela Buchan	1,724	52.3	▲16.0
Conservative	John Riley*	1,280	38.9	▲25.2
UKIP	Ivor Lucas	209	6.3	▼41.0
Liberal Democrats	Mike Gillbard	81	2.5	N/A
Majority		444	13.5	N/A
Turnout		3,294	32.2	▼1.7
Labour gain from Conservative		Swing	▼4.6	

=== Moor View ===
Location of Moor View ward

Moor View 2018
Party	Candidate	Votes	%	±%
Conservative	Maddi Bridgeman*	1,832	49.5	▲14.0
Labour	Jemima Laing	1,474	39.8	▲15.4
UKIP	John Baddeley	242	6.5	▼32.5
Liberal Democrats	Jim Spencer	156	4.2	N/A
Majority		358	9.7	▲6.2
Turnout		3,704	37.4	▼2.2
Conservative hold		Swing	▼0.7	

=== Peverell ===
Location of Peverell ward

Peverell 2018
Party	Candidate	Votes	%	±%
Labour	Jeremy Goslin	2,324	47.6	▲19.1
Conservative	Martin Leaves*	2,081	42.6	▲3.4
Liberal Democrats	George Maunder	284	5.8	▲1.0
Green	Nicholas Casley	173	3.5	▼4.7
Vivamus	Bernard Toolan	24	0.5	▲0.0
Majority		243	5.0	N/A
Turnout		4,886	46.9	▲2.5
Labour gain from Conservative		Swing	▲7.9	

=== Plympton Chaddlewood ===
Location of Plympton Chaddlewood ward

Plympton Chaddlewood 2018
Party	Candidate	Votes	%	±%
Conservative	Glenn Jordan*	1,051	61.3	▲21.9
Labour	Janet Wise	532	31.0	▲10.3
Liberal Democrats	Louise Ayres	132	7.7	N/A
Majority		519	30.3	▲27.3
Turnout		1,715	28.4	▼3.2
Conservative hold		Swing	▲5.8	

=== Plympton St Mary ===
Location of Plympton St Mary ward

Plympton St Mary 2018
Party	Candidate	Votes	%	±%
Conservative	David James*	2,649	70.8	▲22.4
Labour	Rob de Jong	850	22.7	▲4.0
Liberal Democrats	Jeffrey Hall	241	6.4	N/A
Majority		1,799	48.1	▲27.1
Turnout		3,740	37.0	▼2.6
Conservative hold		Swing	▲9.2	

=== Plymstock Dunstone ===
Location of Plymstock Dunstone ward

Plymstock Dunstone 2018
Party	Candidate	Votes	%	±%
Conservative	Vivien Pengelly*	2,411	64.5	▲20.6
Labour	David Owen	905	24.2	▲3.2
Liberal Democrats	Sima Davarian-Dehsorkhe	424	11.3	N/A
Majority		1,506	40.3	▲33.2
Turnout		3,740	38.6	▼3.3
Conservative hold		Swing	▲8.7	

=== Plymstock Radford ===
Location of Plymstock Radford ward

Plymstock Radford 2018
Party	Candidate	Votes	%	±%
Conservative	Rebecca Smith	1,964	48.7	▲9.6
Labour Co-op	Vince Barry	842	20.9	▼0.1
Independent	John Wheeler	453	11.2	N/A
Independent	Gordon Miller	314	7.8	N/A
Liberal Democrats	Roy Plumley	247	6.1	N/A
Green	Matthew Faith	212	5.3	N/A
Majority		1,122	27.8	▲26.6
Turnout		4,032	37.5	▼3.0
Conservative hold		Swing	▲4.9	

=== Southway ===
Location of Southway ward

Southway 2018
Party	Candidate	Votes	%	±%
Labour	Jonny Morris*	1,838	52.6	▲18.0
Conservative	Tim Velkavrh-Blazevic	1,359	38.9	▲15.5
Liberal Democrats	Jacqui Spencer	217	6.2	N/A
TUSC	Nik Brookson	79	2.3	▲1.4
Majority		479	13.7	▲11.3
Turnout		3,493	30.2	▼9.3
Labour hold		Swing	▲1.3	

=== St Budeaux ===
Location of St Budeaux ward

St Budeaux 2018
Party	Candidate	Votes	%	±%
Labour	Sally Bowie*	1,458	49.2	▲10.3
Conservative	Pat Patel	1,189	40.1	▲20.4
Independent	Margaret Bennett Jones	165	5.6	N/A
Liberal Democrats	Stuart Spicer	93	3.1	N/A
TUSC	Andrew White	57	1.9	▼1.1
Majority		269	9.1	▲8.7
Turnout		2,962	30.2	▼2.8
Labour hold		Swing	▼5.1	

=== St Peter and the Waterfront ===
Location of St Peter and the Waterfront ward

St Peter and the Waterfront 2018
Party	Candidate	Votes	%	±%
Labour	Sue McDonald*	1,981	54.5	▲18.7
Conservative	Mark Thompson	1,232	33.9	▲11.4
Liberal Democrats	Hugh Janes	221	6.1	▲1.0
Green	Brian Banks	157	4.3	▼3.8
TUSC	Ian Groeber	41	1.1	▼1.3
Majority		749	20.6	▲9.6
Turnout		3,632	31.8	▼2.6
Labour hold		Swing	▲3.7	

=== Stoke ===
Location of Stoke ward

Stoke 2018
Party	Candidate	Votes	%	±%
Labour	Kevin Neil	1,915	52.5	▲15.6
Conservative	Kathy Watkin	1,219	33.4	▲10.9
Green	Daniel Sheaff	186	5.1	▼4.1
Liberal Democrats	Helen Guy	184	5.0	N/A
UKIP	Michael Arthur	143	3.9	▼18.3
Majority		696	19.1	▲4.7
Turnout		3,647	36.0	▼4.0
Labour hold		Swing	▲2.4	

=== Sutton and Mount Gould ===
Location of Sutton and Mount Gould ward

Sutton and Mount Gould 2018
Party	Candidate	Votes	%	±%
Labour Co-op	Mary Aspinall*	2,102	63.7	▲22.4
Conservative	Chip Tofan	910	27.6	▲8.0
Liberal Democrats	Peter York	209	6.3	N/A
TUSC	Ryan Aldred	80	2.4	▲0.4
Majority		1,192	36.1	▲20.5
Turnout		3,301	33.5	▼2.6
Labour hold		Swing	▲7.2	

== Aftermath ==
Following this election, the Labour group had a majority of councillors. This meant that Labour group leader Tudor Evans became the new leader of Plymouth City Council. Leader of the Labour Party Jeremy Corbyn visited Plymouth to celebrate the result. Outgoing council leader Ian Bowyer remained leader of the Conservative group.

Conservative MP for Plymouth Moor View Johnny Mercer said that the result was due to Plymouth voters believing that defence funding was reducing under the Conservatives. Defeated Drake councillor Steve Ricketts wrote that his defeat was due to students voting Labour.

The Herald described the election as voters deserting UKIP, with Plymouth returning to a two-party political system. The newspaper also emphasised Sima Davarian-Dehsorkhe as the best-performing Liberal Democrat candidate, winning more than 10% of the vote in Plymstock Dunstone.

Labour held its seat in a subsequent by-election in Stoke ward, which took place in July 2018.
