= 2011 Plymouth City Council election =

2011 UK local government election

← 2010	5 May 2011	2012 →

20 of the 57 seats to Plymouth City Council 29 seats needed for a majority
	First party	Second party	Third party
Leader	Vivien Pengelly	Tudor Evans	None
Party	Conservative	Labour	UKIP
Last election	36	20	0
Seats before	36	20	1
Seats won	8	12	1
Seats after	31	25	1
Seat change	▼5	▲5	Steady
Popular vote	28,219	28,340	8,176
Percentage	40.5%	40.7%	11.7%
- Map showing the results of contested wards in the 2011 Plymouth City Council elections.
Council control before election
Conservative
Council control after election
Conservative

The 2011 Plymouth City Council election took place on 5 May 2011 to elect members to Plymouth City Council in England. One third of the council was up for election, in addition to a by-election, making twenty seats in total. The previous election produced a majority for the Conservative Party. The election resulted in Labour gaining 5 seats with Conservatives retaining control.

== Background ==
Plymouth City Council held local elections on 5 May 2011 as part of the 2011 local elections. The council elects its councillors in thirds, with a third being up for election every year for three years, with no election in the fourth year. Councillors defending their seats in this election were previously elected in 2007. In that election, eleven Conservative candidates and eight Labour candidates were elected.

Ahead of this election, the Conservatives had controlled the council for four years, with the main opposition being the Labour Party.

== Overall results ==
2011 Plymouth City Council Election
Party	Seats	Gains	Losses	Net gain/loss	Seats %	Votes %	Votes	+/−
Labour	12	4	0	▲5	60.0	40.7	28,340	▲10.8
Conservative	8	0	4	▼5	40.0	40.5	28,219	▼2.6
Liberal Democrats	0	0	0	Steady	0.0	4.3	3,017	▼10.9
UKIP	0	0	0	Steady	0.0	11.7	8,176	▲8.8
Green	0	0	0	Steady	0.0	2.2	1,510	▼2.0
Independent	0	0	0	Steady	0.0	0.5	378	▼3.5
TUSC	0	0	0	Steady	0.0	0.1	75	New
Total	20						69,715	

Note: All changes in vote share are in comparison to the corresponding 2007 election.

The Conservatives maintained their overall majority on the council, though reduced from six seats to two.

After the previous election, the composition of the council was:

36	20	1
Conservative	Labour	Ind

Immediately before the election, the composition of the council was:

36	20	1
Conservative	Labour	UKIP

After this election, the composition of the council was:

31	25	1
Conservative	Labour	UKIP

== Ward results ==
=== Budshead ===
Location of Budshead ward

Budshead 2011
Party	Candidate	Votes	%
Conservative	Jonathan Charles Thomas Drean	1,756	45.8
Labour Co-op	Mike Fox	1,641	42.8
UKIP	Hugh Martyn Williams	437	11.4
Majority		115	3.0
Turnout		3834	40.0
Conservative hold			

=== Compton ===
Location of Compton ward

Compton 2011
Party	Candidate	Votes	%
Conservative	David John Stark	1,938	48.3
Labour	Stephen Paul Randall	1,086	27.0
UKIP	Michael Robert Cooke	364	9.1
Liberal Democrats	Paul Huntley	359	8.9
Green	Colin James Trier	268	6.7
Majority		852	21.2
Turnout		4,015	42.8
Conservative hold			

=== Devonport ===
Location of Devonport ward

Devonport 2011
Party	Candidate	Votes	%
Labour	Mark Antony Coker	1,519	52.1
Conservative	Betty Gray	830	28.5
UKIP	Syd Brooks	403	13.8
Green	Andrew Robert Pratt	162	5.6
Majority		689	23.6
Turnout		2914	30.0
Labour hold			

=== Drake ===
Location of Drake ward

Drake 2011
Party	Candidate	Votes	%
Labour	Chaz Singh	589	37.1
Conservative	Andy Fox	506	31.9
Liberal Democrats	Rebecca Jane Trimnell	178	11.2
Green	Wendy Margaret Miller	116	7.3
UKIP	Chris Palmer	99	6.2
Independent	David Santillo	97	6.1
Majority		83	5.2
Turnout		1,585	33.8
Labour gain from Conservative			

=== Efford and Lipson ===
Location of Efford and Lipson ward

Efford and Lipson 2011
Party	Candidate	Votes	%
Labour Co-op	Pauline Murphy	1,785	53.6
Conservative	Nick Kelly	832	25.0
UKIP	Ramon Philip Fereday	362	10.9
Liberal Democrats	Duncan Telford Beasley	189	5.7
Green	Roger Michael Creagh-Osborne	161	4.8
Majority		953	28.6
Turnout		3,329	36.0
Labour hold			

=== Eggbuckland ===
Location of Eggbuckland ward

Eggbuckland 2011
Party	Candidate	Votes	%
Conservative	Lynda Margaret Bowyer	2,185	48.4
Labour	Mark Andrew Thompson	1,670	37.0
UKIP	Roger Kenneth Thomas	664	14.7
Majority		953	21.1
Turnout		4,519	44.0
Conservative hold			

=== Ham ===
Location of Ham ward

Ham 2011
Party	Candidate	Votes	%
Labour Co-op	Tudor Evans	1,843	54.7
Conservative	Tim Delbridge	969	28.8
UKIP	Alan John Skuse	558	16.6
Majority		874	25.9
Turnout		3,370	35.0
Labour hold			

=== Honicknowle ===
Location of Honicknowle ward

Honicknowle 2011
Party	Candidate	Votes	%
Labour	Mark John Lowry	1,790	54.0
UKIP	Ron Northcott	675	20.3
Conservative	Paul Rielly	671	20.2
Green	David Wildman	181	5.5
Majority		1,115	33.6
Turnout		3,317	32.0
Labour hold			

=== Moor View ===
Location of Moor View ward

Moor View 2011
Party	Candidate	Votes	%
Labour	Alison Marie Casey	2,049	55.3
Conservative	Mark Christie	1,655	44.7
Majority		394	10.6
Turnout		3,704	40.0
Labour hold			

=== Peverell ===
Location of Peverell ward

Peverell 2011
Party	Candidate	Votes	%
Conservative	John Mahoney	2,059	45.5
Labour	Jonathan Taylor	1,461	32.3
Liberal Democrats	Richard Lawrie	604	13.3
UKIP	John Read	405	8.9
Majority		598	13.2
Turnout		4,529	45.0
Conservative hold			

=== Plympton Erle ===
Location of Plympton Erle ward

Plympton Erle 2011
Party	Candidate	Votes	%
Conservative	Terri Beer	1,597	55.2
Labour	Roger Williams	834	28.8
UKIP	John Roberts	461	15.9
Majority		763	26.4
Turnout		2,892	42.5
Conservative hold			

=== Plympton St Mary ===
Location of Plympton St Mary ward

Plympton St Mary 2011
Party	Candidate	Votes	%
Conservative	Patrick John Nicholson	2,687	59.8
Labour	Prathees Kristino Kishore	943	21.0
UKIP	Jonathan Brian Frost	581	12.9
Independent	James Alexander Sanderson	281	6.3
Majority		1,744	38.8
Turnout		4,492	45.1
Conservative hold			

=== Plymstock Dunstone ===
Location of Plymstock Dunstone ward

Plymstock Dunstone 2011
Party	Candidate	Votes	%
Conservative	Nigel Andrew Churchill	2,201	49.4
Labour	Bethan Rose Davey	955	21.5
Liberal Democrats	Sima Davarian	515	17.5
UKIP	David Salmon	781	11.6
Majority		1,246	28.0
Turnout		4,452	46.0
Conservative hold			

=== Plymstock Radford ===
Location of Plymstock Radford ward

Plymstock Radford 2011
Party	Candidate	Votes	%
Conservative	Ken Foster	2,132	50.4
Labour	Shirley Margaret Smith	1,071	25.3
UKIP	Andrea Bullock	599	14.2
Liberal Democrats	Michael James Symons	430	10.2
Majority		1,061	25.1
Turnout		4,232	
Conservative hold			

=== St Budeaux ===
Location of St Budeaux ward

St Budeaux 2011
Party	Candidate	Votes	%
Labour	George William Wheeler	1,901	57.2
Conservative	Stuart Bernard Charles	844	25.4
UKIP	Paul Bedson	579	17.4
Majority		1,057	31.8
Turnout		3,324	34.0
Labour gain from Conservative			

=== St Peter and the Waterfront ===
Location of St Peter and the Waterfront ward

St Peter and the Waterfront 2011 (2 Councillors)
Party	Candidate	Votes	%
Labour	Chris Penberthy	1,607	24.5
Labour	Ian Glenn Tuffin	1,383	21.1
Conservative	Tam MacPherson	1,204	18.3
Conservative	Chris Robinson	1,165	17.7
Liberal Democrats	Hugh Janes	415	6.3
UKIP	Roy Alfred Kettle	400	6.1
Green	Matt Ray	396	6.0
Majority		224	3.4
Turnout		6,570	34.8
Labour hold			
Labour gain from Conservative			

=== Southway ===
Location of Southway ward

Southway 2011
Party	Candidate	Votes	%
Labour	John David Smith	2,096	53.3
Conservative	Brian William George Roberts	1,839	46.7
Majority		257	6.5
Turnout		3,935	41.0
Labour gain from Conservative			

=== Stoke ===
Location of Stoke ward

Stoke 2011
Party	Candidate	Votes	%
Labour Co-op	Philippa Davey	1,875	48.2
Conservative	Joan Mary Watkins	1,492	38.4
UKIP	Fiona Hurst-Baird	520	13.4
Majority		383	9.9
Turnout		3,887	41.0
Labour gain from Conservative			

=== Sutton and Mount Gould ===
Location of Sutton and Mount Gould ward

Sutton and Mount Gould 2011
Party	Candidate	Votes	%
Labour	Jean Florence Neider	1,625	48.3
Conservative	Katy Hitchman	822	22.4
UKIP	Jonquil Patricia Webber	288	8.6
Green	Tean Jane Mitchell	226	6.7
TUSC	Louise Anne Parker	75	2.2
Liberal Democrats	Peter York	327	9.7
Majority		806	24.0
Turnout		3,363	34.7
Labour hold			
