= 2015 Plymouth City Council election =

2015 UK local government election

← 2014	7 May 2015	2016 →

19 of the 57 seats to Plymouth City Council 29 seats needed for a majority
	First party	Second party	Third party
Leader	Tudor Evans	Ian Bowyer	None
Party	Labour	Conservative	UKIP
Seats before	30	24	3
Seats won	9	10	0
Seats after	28	26	3
Seat change	▼2	▲2	Steady
Popular vote	36,521	44,388	23,404
Percentage	31.1%	37.8%	19.9%
- Map showing the results of contested positions in the 2015 Plymouth City Council elections.
Council control before election
Labour
Council control after election
No overall control

The 2015 Plymouth City Council election took place on 7 May 2015 to elect members of Plymouth City Council in England.

The Labour Party lost its narrow majority, resulting in no party having overall control.

== Background ==
Plymouth City Council held local elections on 7 May 2015 along with councils across the United Kingdom as part of the 2015 local elections. The council elects its councillors in thirds, with a third being up for election every year for three years, with no election in the fourth year.

Councillors defending their seats in this election were previously elected in 2011. In that election, twelve Labour candidates and eight Conservative candidates were elected. Two Labour candidates had been elected in St Peter and the Waterfront due to a by-election coinciding with the council election, only one of whom was defending their seat in this election.

== Overall results ==
2015 Plymouth City Council Election
Party	Seats	Gains	Losses	Net gain/loss	Seats %	Votes %	Votes	+/−
Conservative	10	2	0	▲2	52.6	37.8	44,388	▼2.7
Labour	9	0	2	▼2	47.4	31.1	36,521	▼9.6
UKIP	3	3	0	▲3	15.8	19.9	23,404	▲8.2
Green	0	0	0	Steady	0.0	6.2	7,328	▲4.0
Liberal Democrats	0	0	0	Steady	0.0	3.4	4,008	▼0.9
TUSC	0	0	0	Steady	0.0	0.9	1,025	▲0.8
Independent	0	0	0	Steady	0.0	0.5	624	0.0
Vivamus	0	0	0	Steady	0.0	0.0	50	New
Both Parents Matter	0	0	0	Steady	0.0	0.0	36	New
Total	19						117,348	

Note: All changes in vote share are in comparison to the corresponding 2011 election.

The Labour Party lost their majority on the council, leaving the council under no overall control.

After the previous election, the composition of the council was:

↓
30	24	3
Labour	Conservative	UKIP

After this election, the composition of the council was:

↓
28	26	3
Labour	Conservative	UKIP

== Ward results ==
Asterisks denote sitting councillors seeking re-election.

=== Budshead ===
Location of Budshead ward

Budshead 2015
Party	Candidate	Votes	%	±%
Conservative	Jonathan Drean*	2,473	41.2	▼4.6
Labour Co-op	Linda Crick	1,802	30.0	▼12.8
UKIP	John McCarthy	1,256	20.9	▲9.5
Green	Kathryn Driscoll	206	3.4	N/A
Liberal Democrats	Anthony Williams	203	3.4	N/A
Both Parents Matter	Andrew Bull	36	0.6	N/A
TUSC	Henry Redmond	29	0.5	N/A
Majority		671	11.2	▲8.2
Turnout		6,005	62.9	
Conservative hold		Swing	▲4.1	

=== Compton ===
Location of Compton ward

Compton 2015
Party	Candidate	Votes	%	±%
Conservative	David Fletcher	2,876	44.4	▼3.9
Labour	Simon Healy	1,781	27.5	▲0.5
UKIP	Alex Thomson	898	13.8	▲4.7
Green	Daniel van Cleak	504	7.8	▲1.1
Liberal Democrats	Stephen Guy	378	5.8	▼3.1
TUSC	Nigel Buckley	47	0.7	N/A
Majority		1,095	16.9	▲4.4
Turnout		6,484	71.9	
Conservative hold		Swing	▼1.7	

=== Devonport ===
Location of Devonport ward

Devonport 2015
Party	Candidate	Votes	%	±%
Labour	Mark Coker*	2,360	40.0	▼12.1
Conservative	Sandy Borthwick	1,617	27.7	▼0.8
UKIP	Michael Ellison	1,221	20.9	▲7.1
Green	Dave Bertelli	351	6.0	▲0.4
Liberal Democrats	John Brooks	244	4.2	N/A
TUSC	Paddy Ryan	42	0.7	N/A
Majority		743	12.7	▼9.9
Turnout		5,835	56.9	
Labour hold		Swing	▼5.7	

=== Drake ===
Location of Drake ward

Drake 2015
Party	Candidate	Votes	%	±%
Labour	Chaz Singh*	1,547	38.3	▲1.1
Conservative	Mark Christie	1,154	28.6	▼3.3
Green	Daniel Sheaff	819	20.3	▲13.0
UKIP	Alan Skuse	271	6.7	▲0.5
Liberal Democrats	Jeffrey Hall	208	5.2	▼6.0
TUSC	Ryan Aldred	35	0.9	N/A
Majority		393	9.7	▲4.4
Turnout		4,034	61.2	
Labour hold		Swing	▲2.2	

=== Efford and Lipson ===
Location of Efford and Lipson ward

Efford and Lipson 2015
Party	Candidate	Votes	%	±%
Labour Co-op	Pauline Murphy*	2,429	41.2	▼12.4
Conservative	Colin Berry	1,499	25.4	▲0.4
UKIP	Grace Stickland	1,175	19.9	▲9.0
Green	Ian Poyser	439	7.4	▲2.6
Liberal Democrats	Fleur Ball	234	4.0	▼1.7
Independent	Terry Luscombe	80	1.4	N/A
TUSC	Hannah Lewis	43	0.7	N/A
Majority		1,254	15.8	▼12.8
Turnout		5,899	60.2	
Labour Co-op hold		Swing	▼6.0	

=== Eggbuckland ===
Location of Eggbuckland ward

Eggbuckland 2015
Party	Candidate	Votes	%	±%
Conservative	Lynda Bowyer*	3,382	48.0	▼0.4
Labour	Chris Mavin	1,829	25.9	▼11.1
UKIP	Hugh Davies	1,440	20.4	▲5.7
Green	Jonathan Noades	351	5.0	N/A
TUSC	Marc Chudley	51	0.7	N/A
Majority		1,553	22.1	▲10.7
Turnout		7,053	68.2	
Conservative hold		Swing	▲5.4	

=== Ham ===
Location of Ham ward

Ham 2015
Party	Candidate	Votes	%	±%
Labour Co-op	Tudor Evans*	2,176	38.6	▼16.1
UKIP	Jason Shopland	1,512	26.8	▲10.2
Conservative	Jon Runge	1,465	26.0	▼2.8
Liberal Democrats	Richard Bray	251	4.4	N/A
Green	Cameron Hayward	195	3.5	N/A
TUSC	John Williams	43	0.8	N/A
Majority		664	11.2	▼14.7
Turnout		5,642	59.5	
Labour Co-op hold		Swing	▼13.2	

=== Honicknowle ===
Location of Honicknowle ward

Honicknowle 2015
Party	Candidate	Votes	%	±%
Labour	Mark Lowry*	2,414	41.7	▼12.3
UKIP	Shaun Hooper	1,718	29.7	▲9.4
Conservative	Gloria Bragg	1,371	23.7	▲3.5
Green	Andrew Pratt	211	3.6	▼1.9
Independent	Arthur Watson	38	0.7	N/A
TUSC	George Fidler	37	0.6	N/A
Majority		696	12.0	▼22.3
Turnout		5,789	56.5	
Labour hold		Swing	▼10.8	

=== Moor View ===
Location of Moor View ward

Moor View 2015
Party	Candidate	Votes	%	±%
Conservative	Nick Kelly	2,417	38.3	▼6.4
Labour Co-op	Janet Wise	1,912	30.3	▼25.0
UKIP	Bill Wakeham	1,457	23.1	N/A
Liberal Democrats	Jack Dubois	283	4.5	N/A
Green	Emma Weatherhead	184	2.9	N/A
Independent	Alison Casey	39	0.6	N/A
TUSC	Keith Low	26	0.4	N/A
Majority		505	8.0	N/A
Turnout		6,318	67.6	
Conservative gain from Labour		Swing	▲9.3	

=== Peverell ===
Location of Peverell ward

Peverell 2015
Party	Candidate	Votes	%	±%
Conservative	John Mahony*	3,288	42.9	▼2.6
Labour	Paul McNamara	2,237	29.2	▼3.1
UKIP	Peter Brooksbank	944	12.3	▲3.4
Green	Wendy Miller	624	8.1	N/A
Liberal Democrats	Richard Lawrie	452	5.9	▼7.4
TUSC	Justin Pollard	71	0.9	N/A
Vivamus	Bernard Toolan	71	0.7	N/A
Majority		1,051	13.7	▲0.5
Turnout		7,666	74.2	
Conservative hold		Swing	▼0.3	

=== Plympton Erle ===
Location of Plympton Erle ward

Plympton Erle 2015
Party	Candidate	Votes	%	±%
Conservative	Terri Beer*	2,273	47.9	▼7.3
Labour	Roger Williams	935	19.7	▼9.1
UKIP	Peter Endean	934	19.7	▲3.8
Liberal Democrats	Sara Jennett	312	6.6	N/A
Green	Tom Pointon	239	5.0	N/A
TUSC	Louise Alldridge	54	1.1	N/A
Majority		1,338	28.2	▲1.8
Turnout		4,747	68.6	
Conservative hold		Swing	▲0.9	

=== Plympton St Mary ===
Location of Plympton St Mary ward

Plympton St Mary 2015
Party	Candidate	Votes	%	±%
Conservative	Patrick Nicholson*	4,326	59.2	▼0.6
UKIP	Jonathan Frost	1,287	17.6	▲4.7
Labour Co-op	Rob De Jong	1,252	17.1	▼3.9
Green	David Owen	372	5.1	N/A
TUSC	Tom Nally	70	1.0	N/A
Majority		3,039	41.6	▲2.8
Turnout		7,307	71.5	
Conservative hold		Swing	▼2.7	

=== Plymstock Dunstone ===
Location of Plymstock Dunstone ward

Plymstock Dunstone 2015
Party	Candidate	Votes	%	±%
Conservative	Nigel Churchill*	3,424	48.7	▼0.7
UKIP	David Salmon	1,730	24.6	▲7.1
Labour Co-op	Dena Rafati	1,154	16.4	▼5.1
Liberal Democrats	Sima Davarian-Dehsorkhe	433	6.2	▼5.2
Green	Aaron Scott-Carter	260	3.7	N/A
TUSC	Teresa Stuart	35	0.5	N/A
Majority		1,694	24.1	▼3.8
Turnout		7,036	72.8	
Conservative hold		Swing	▼3.9	

=== Plymstock Radford ===
Location of Plymstock Radford ward

Plymstock Radford 2015
Party	Candidate	Votes	%	±%
Conservative	Ken Foster*	3,417	49.3	▼1.1
UKIP	John Wheeler	1,786	25.8	▲11.6
Labour	Mark Thompson	1,600	23.1	▼2.1
TUSC	Thomas Sloman	126	1.8	N/A
Majority		1,631	23.5	▼1.6
Turnout		6,929	70.0	
Conservative hold		Swing	▼6.4	

=== Southway ===
Location of Southway ward

Southway 2015
Party	Candidate	Votes	%	±%
Conservative	Mark Deacon	2,232	34.9	▼11.8
Labour	John Shillabeer	2,147	33.6	▼19.7
UKIP	David Coles	1,447	22.6	N/A
Independent	Dennis Silverwood	302	4.7	N/A
Green	Thomas Hathway	226	3.5	N/A
TUSC	Nik Brookson	40	0.6	N/A
Majority		85	1.3	N/A
Turnout		6,394	64.2	
Conservative gain from Labour		Swing	▲4.0	

=== St Budeaux ===
Location of St Budeaux ward

St Budeaux 2015
Party	Candidate	Votes	%	±%
Labour	George Wheeler*	2,137	39.0	▼18.2
Conservative	James Carlyle	1,537	28.1	▲2.7
UKIP	Adam Duffield	1,486	27.2	▲9.8
Green	Mark Ovenden	257	4.7	N/A
TUSC	Aaron Smith	56	1.0	N/A
Majority		600	10.9	▼20.9
Turnout		5,473	56.2	
Labour hold		Swing	▼10.5	

=== Stoke ===
Location of Stoke ward

Stoke 2015
Party	Candidate	Votes	%	±%
Labour	Philippa Davey*	2,299	36.1	▼12.1
Conservative	Tony Carson	2,150	33.7	▼4.7
UKIP	Philip Partridge	930	14.6	▲1.2
Green	Cameron Millar	637	10.0	N/A
Liberal Democrats	Helen Guy	298	4.7	N/A
TUSC	Lesley Duncan	63	1.0	N/A
Majority		149	2.4	▼7.4
Turnout		6,377	66.7	
Labour hold		Swing	▼3.4	

=== St Peter and the Waterfront ===
St Peter and the Waterfront 2015
Party	Candidate	Votes	%	±%
Labour	Chris Penberthy*	2,239	35.6	▼4.4
Conservative	Karen Thurston	1,801	28.6	▼1.3
UKIP	Paul Chapman	981	15.6	▲5.7
Green	Colin Trier	730	11.6	▲1.8
Liberal Democrats	Hugh Janes	329	5.2	▼5.1
TUSC	Roxy Castell	80	1.3	N/A
Independent	Michael Moore	72	1.1	N/A
Independent	Ray Rees	57	0.9	N/A
Majority		438	7.0	▼3.1
Turnout		6,289	30.4	
Labour hold		Swing	▼1.6	

=== Sutton and Mount Gould ===
Location of Sutton and Mount Gould ward

Sutton and Mount Gould 2015
Party	Candidate	Votes	%	±%
Labour	Sue Dann	2,271	37.4	▼10.9
Conservative	Edmund Shillabeer	1,686	27.8	▲3.4
UKIP	Peter Hubble	931	15.3	▲6.7
Green	Josh Leal	723	11.9	▲5.2
Liberal Democrats	Peter York	383	6.3	▼3.4
TUSC	Louise Parker	77	1.3	▼0.9
Majority		585	9.6	▼14.3
Turnout		6,071	63.5	
Labour hold		Swing	▼3.8	

== Aftermath ==
The Labour Party lost control of the council, remaining the largest party with one seat short of an overall majority.
