= 1997 Plymouth City Council election =

1997 UK local government election

- 1 May 1997

All 60 seats in the Plymouth City Council 31 seats needed for a majority
	First party	Second party
Party	Labour	Conservative
Last election	54 seats, 61.2%	6 seats, 26.4%
Seats won	47	13
Seat change	▼7	▲7
Popular vote	62,966	43,731
Percentage	47.2%	32.8%
Swing	▼14.0%	▲6.4%
- Map showing the results of the 1997 Plymouth City Council elections.
Council control before election
Labour
Council control after election
Labour

The 1997 Plymouth City Council election took place on 1 May 1997 to elect members of Plymouth City Council in Devon, England. This was on the same day as other local elections. The Labour Party retained control of the council, which it had held since 1991.

== Overall results ==
1997 Plymouth City Council Election
Party	Seats	Gains	Losses	Net gain/loss	Seats %	Votes %	Votes	+/−
Labour	47	1	8	▼7	78.3	47.2	62,966	▼13.5
Conservative	13	8	1	▲7	21.7	32.8	43,731	▲6.6
Liberal Democrats	0	0	0	Steady	0.0	17.3	23,146	▲9.2
Independent	0	0	0	Steady	0.0	1.1	1,405	▲0.6
Green	0	0	0	Steady	0.0	0.8	1,030	▲0.4
Independent Democrat	0	0	0	Steady	0.0	0.7	999	New
UKIP	0	0	0	Steady	0.0	0.2	244	▼0.6
Total	60						133,521	

== Ward results ==
=== Budshead (3 seats) ===
Location of Budshead ward

Budshead (3 seats)
Party	Candidate	Votes	%
Labour	Ronald Sydney Simmonds	3,997	
Labour	Paul Carter	3,746	
Labour	Thomas Barry Coleman	3,474	
Liberal Democrats	S. Hutty	1,203	
Conservative	K. Watkin	1,168	
Liberal Democrats	M. Trench	1,058	
Turnout			65.0%
Labour hold			
Labour hold			
Labour hold			

=== Compton (3 seats) ===
Location of Compton ward

Compton (3 seats)
Party	Candidate	Votes	%
Conservative	Albert Fry	3,402	
Conservative	Thomas Edward James Savery	3,362	
Conservative	David John Stark	3,221	
Labour	K. French	1,677	
Labour	L. Harris	1,674	
Labour	I. Tuffin	1,526	
Liberal Democrats	R. Casley	1,390	
Liberal Democrats	J. Rushton	1,307	
Liberal Democrats	D. Van Eetvelt	1,063	
Green	F. Allen	502	
Turnout			67.4%
Conservative hold			
Conservative hold			
Conservative hold			

=== Drake (3 seats) ===
Location of Drake ward

Drake (3 seats)
Party	Candidate	Votes	%
Labour	Christopher Peter Burgess	2,376	
Labour	Ernest Alexander Colley	2,340	
Labour	Pauline Mary Purnell	2,245	
Liberal Democrats	G. Nye	2,031	
Liberal Democrats	B. Yardley	1,962	
Conservative	P. Parnall	1,917	
Conservative	W. Hodges	1,881	
Liberal Democrats	P. York	1,842	
Conservative	M. White	1,824	
Green	G. Grindrod	528	
Turnout			60.8%
Labour hold			
Labour hold			
Labour hold			

=== Efford (3 seats) ===
Location of Efford ward

Efford (3 seats)
Party	Candidate	Votes	%
Labour	Bernard Claude Alexander Miller	3,404	
Labour	Jane Margaret Jones	3,314	
Labour	Brian Vincent	3,161	
Conservative	K. Banks	1,671	
Conservative	M. Leaves	1,550	
Conservative	M. Orchard	1,524	
Liberal Democrats	R. Bray	982	
Liberal Democrats	D. Taylor	941	
Liberal Democrats	R. Vosper	911	
Turnout			68.6%
Labour hold			
Labour hold			
Labour hold			

=== Eggbuckland (3 seats) ===
Location of Eggbuckland ward

Eggbuckland (3 seats)
Party	Candidate	Votes	%
Labour	Derick Brian Bray	4,034	
Labour	Michael George Wright	3,787	
Labour	Robert Anthony Gachagan	3,527	
Conservative	G. Bragg	2,633	
Conservative	M. Foster	2,372	
Conservative	J. Wallace	2,365	
Liberal Democrats	A. Nelmes	1,627	
Turnout			72.7%
Labour hold			
Labour hold			
Labour hold			

=== Estover (3 seats) ===
Location of Estover ward

Estover (3 seats)
Party	Candidate	Votes	%
Labour	Michael Robert Fox	3,937	
Labour	Charles Joseph William Demuth	3,736	
Labour	Valentine Hiromeris	3,269	
Conservative	P. Brookshaw	3,184	
Conservative	M. Gibson	3,146	
Conservative	B. Brookshaw	3,139	
Liberal Democrats	T. Wickett	1,634	
Turnout			68.3%
Labour hold			
Labour hold			
Labour hold			

=== Ham (3 seats) ===
Location of Ham ward

Ham (3 seats)
Party	Candidate	Votes	%
Labour	Frederick James Ball	3,533	
Labour	Tudor Evans	3,143	
Labour	D. Knott	2,911	
Conservative	G. Monahan	1,288	
Independent Democrat	P. Stanner	999	
Turnout			65.5%
Labour hold			
Labour hold			
Labour hold			

=== Honicknowle (3 seats) ===
Location of Honicknowle ward

Honicknowle (3 seats)
Party	Candidate	Votes	%
Labour	John Joseph Ingham	4,639	
Labour	Alan George Ford	4,135	
Labour	A. Bennett	3,976	
Conservative	R. Mahony	1,765	
Turnout			67.6%
Labour hold			
Labour hold			
Labour hold			

=== Keyham (3 seats) ===
Location of Keyham ward

Keyham (3 seats)
Party	Candidate	Votes	%
Labour	Michael John Sheaff	3,100	
Labour	Alan Stephens	2,704	
Labour	Steven Paul Lemin	2,152	
Conservative	J. Johnson	1,471	
Conservative	S. Wheeler	1,331	
Liberal Democrats	M. Gallagher	1,213	
Conservative	D. McKechnie	1,171	
Turnout			61.4%
Labour hold			
Labour hold			
Labour hold			

=== Mount Gould (3 seats) ===
Location of Mount Gould ward

Mount Gould (3 seats)
Party	Candidate	Votes	%
Labour	Patrica Nora Coyle	2,410	
Labour	Edwin Shaun Rennie	2,251	
Labour	John Gerard Williams	2,249	
Conservative	C. Atkey	1,447	
Conservative	M. Campbell	1,440	
Conservative	M. Turner	1,283	
Liberal Democrats	N. Black	1,119	
Liberal Democrats	C. Summerfield	1,116	
Liberal Democrats	H. Biles	1,078	
Independent	C. Brown	450	
Independent	S. Mitchell	335	
Independent	M. Roberts	286	
Turnout			61.8%
Labour hold			
Labour hold			
Labour hold			

=== Plympton Erle (3 seats) ===
Location of Plympton Erle ward

Plympton Erle (3 seats)
Party	Candidate	Votes	%
Conservative	Kathleen Lucy Banks	3,627	
Conservative	John Frederick Fox	3,473	
Conservative	David John James	3,379	
Labour	R. Rogers	3,262	
Labour	K. Hill	2,992	
Labour	I. Gordon	2,962	
Liberal Democrats	K. Hill	2,725	
Liberal Democrats	M. Neale	2,448	
Turnout			70.0%
Conservative gain from Labour			
Conservative gain from Labour			
Conservative gain from Labour			

=== Plympton St Mary (3 seats) ===
Location of Plympton St Mary ward

Plympton St Mary (3 seats)
Party	Candidate	Votes	%
Conservative	Joan Iris Stopporton	3,510	
Conservative	Patrick Nicholson	3,321	
Conservative	Maureen Lawley	3,294	
Labour	P. Smith	2,613	
Labour	A. Wellington	2,313	
Labour	G. Shears	2,303	
Liberal Democrats	D. Tyrie	1,711	
Turnout			73.7%
Conservative gain from Labour			
Conservative gain from Labour			
Conservative hold			

=== Plymstock Dunstone (3 seats) ===
Location of Plymstock Dunstone ward

Plymstock Dunstone (3 seats)
Party	Candidate	Votes	%
Conservative	David Frank Viney	3,687	
Conservative	Vivien Anne Pengelly	3,360	
Conservative	Kevin Charles Wigens	3,174	
Labour	J. Kirk	2,493	
Labour	R. Evans	2,411	
Labour	E. Cohen	2,217	
Liberal Democrats	S. Byatt	1,796	
Liberal Democrats	J. Coker	1,689	
Liberal Democrats	M. Coker	1,571	
Turnout			72.4%
Conservative hold			
Conservative gain from Labour			
Conservative gain from Labour			

=== Plymstock Radford (3 seats) ===
Location of Plymstock Radford ward

Plymstock Radford (3 seats)
Party	Candidate	Votes	%
Labour	Ruth Earl	2,496	
Conservative	Kenneth James Foster	2,288	
Labour	Peter Francis Allan	2,284	
Conservative	A. Lugger	2,207	
Labour	S. Polkinghorn	2,035	
Conservative	M. Leaves	2,016	
Liberal Democrats	C. Burrows	1,407	
Liberal Democrats	J. Tisdall	1,333	
Liberal Democrats	J. Byatt	1,184	
UKIP	R. Bullock	244	
Turnout			72.4%
Labour hold			
Conservative gain from Labour			
Labour hold			

=== Southway (3 seats) ===
Location of Southway ward

Southway (3 seats)
Party	Candidate	Votes	%
Labour	Dennis John Camp	4,204	
Labour	Eileen Ruby Evans	4,102	
Labour	John George Jones	4,036	
Conservative	J. Harden	2,143	
Conservative	E. Willey	2,002	
Conservative	G. Horler	1,980	
Turnout			67.7%
Labour hold			
Labour hold			
Labour hold			

=== St Budeax (3 seats) ===
Location of St Budeax ward

St Budeax (3 seats)
Party	Candidate	Votes	%
Labour	John Ambrose Coyle	3,619	
Labour	Debre Ann Roche	3,424	
Labour	Thomas Trerise Wildy	3,075	
Conservative	J. Plymsol	2,145	
Turnout			64.0%
Labour hold			
Labour hold			
Labour hold			

=== St Peter (3 seats) ===
Location of St Peter ward

St Peter (3 seats)
Party	Candidate	Votes	%
Labour	Sylvia Yvonne Bellamy	2,918	
Labour	Mark Anthony King	2,521	
Labour	Ashley Telford Mason	2,338	
Liberal Democrats	R. Egerton	968	
Conservative	D. Gamble	964	
Conservative	J. Parry	949	
Conservative	J. Paton	879	
Liberal Democrats	P. Jones	859	
Liberal Democrats	H. Guy	858	
Independent	D. Kelway	271	
Independent	M. Howes	186	
Independent	T. Russell	181	
Turnout			55.6%
Labour hold			
Labour hold			
Labour hold			

=== Stoke (3 seats) ===
Location of Stoke ward

Stoke (3 seats)
Party	Candidate	Votes	%
Labour	David Alexander Millar	2,961	
Labour	Janet Millar	2,831	
Labour	William John Stevens	2,577	
Conservative	C. Pascoe	1,993	
Conservative	B. Pascoe	1,990	
Conservative	B. Fox	1,976	
Liberal Democrats	J. Evans	1,277	
Liberal Democrats	S. Guy	1,258	
Liberal Democrats	M. Hazell	1,174	
Turnout			63.2%
Labour hold			
Labour hold			
Labour hold			

=== Sutton (3 seats) ===
Location of Sutton ward

Sutton (3 seats)
Party	Candidate	Votes	%
Labour	Christopher Mavin	2,602	
Labour	Jean Nelder	2,592	
Labour	George Wheeler	2,403	
Conservative	F. Brimacombe	1,397	
Conservative	D. Brimacombe	1,291	
Conservative	R. Garley	1,139	
Liberal Democrats	J. Dean	895	
Liberal Democrats	M. Flippance	789	
Liberal Democrats	T. Longworth	784	
Independent	K. Kelway	684	
Independent	G. Fletcher	419	
Independent	J. Preece	359	
Turnout			61.4%
Labour hold			
Labour hold			
Labour hold			

=== Trelawny (3 seats) ===
Location of Trelawny ward

Trelawny (3 seats)
Party	Candidate	Votes	%
Labour	Howard Leslie Davey	2,691	
Labour	David Martin Palmer	2,645	
Labour	Thelma Hilda Irene Rider	2,608	
Conservative	P. Nicholson	2,031	
Conservative	D. Kaye	2,007	
Conservative	R. Lloyd	1,897	
Liberal Democrats	K. D'Arcy	901	
Liberal Democrats	A. Robins	878	
Liberal Democrats	S. Simmonds	776	
Turnout			73.7%
Labour hold			
Labour hold			
Labour gain from Conservative			
