= 2016 Plymouth City Council election =

2016 UK local government election

← 2015	5 May 2016	2018 →

19 of the 57 seats to Plymouth City Council 29 seats needed for a majority
	First party	Second party	Third party
Leader	Tudor Evans	Ian Bowyer	None
Party	Labour	Conservative	UKIP
Seats before	28	26	3
Seats won	11	8	0
Seats after	27	27	3
Seat change	▼1	▲1	Steady
Popular vote	21,394	20,797	9,577
Percentage	36.5%	35.5%	16.3%
- Map showing the results of contested wards in the 2016 Plymouth City Council elections.
Council control before election
No overall control
Council control after election
No overall control

The 2016 Plymouth City Council election took place on 5 May 2016 to elect members of Plymouth City Council in England. The Conservatives gained one seat from Labour, resulting in both parties having twenty-seven members of the council. A coalition of Conservative and UKIP members took overall control of the Council, having thirty members in total and a working majority.

== Background ==
Plymouth City Council held local elections on 5 May 2016 along with councils across the United Kingdom as part of the 2016 local elections. The council elects its councillors in thirds, with a third being up for election every year for three years, with no election in the fourth year. Councillors defending their seats in this election were previously elected in 2012. In that election, twelve Labour candidates and seven Conservative candidates were elected.

Ahead of this election, the council was under no overall control with Labour running a minority administration. The party had the largest number of seats, but was one seat short of a majority.

The election was also contested by the Plymouth Independents, a new political party formed by former UKIP members. The party won no seats, and has subsequently been dissolved having contested no further elections.

== Overall results ==
Plymouth City Council Election 2016
Party	Seats	Gains	Losses	Net gain/loss	Seats %	Votes %	Votes	+/−
Labour	11	0	1	▼1	57.9	36.5	21,394	▼7.1
Conservative	8	1	0	▲1	42.1	35.5	20,797	▲5.3
UKIP	0	0	0	Steady	0.0	16.3	9,577	▼4.3
Liberal Democrats	0	0	0	Steady	0.0	4.4	2,553	▲1.4
Plymouth Independents	0	0	0	Steady	0.0	3.1	1,790	New
Green	0	0	0	Steady	0.0	2.5	1,454	▲0.9
TUSC	0	0	0	Steady	0.0	1.8	1,033	▲1.7

Note: All changes in vote share are in comparison to the corresponding 2012 election.

At the previous election the composition of the council was:

↓
28	26	3
Labour	Conservative	UKIP

After the election the composition of the council was:

↓
27	27	3
Labour	Conservative	UKIP

== Ward results ==
Asterisks denote sitting councillors seeking re-election.

=== Budshead ===
Location of Budshead ward

Budshead 2016
Party	Candidate	Votes	%	±%
Labour	Jon Taylor*	1,373	39.9	▼6.0
Conservative	Charlotte Bladen	1,283	37.3	▼1.6
UKIP	Gordon Miller	585	17.0	▲1.7
Green	Joshua Pope	99	2.9	N/A
Liberal Democrats	Roger Mitchell	75	2.2	N/A
TUSC	Andrew White	29	0.8	N/A
Majority		90	2.6	▼4.5
Labour hold		Swing	▼2.2	

=== Compton ===
Location of Compton ward

Compton 2016
Party	Candidate	Votes	%	±%
Conservative	Richard Ball*	1,536	49.0	▲8.6
Labour	John Petrie	894	28.5	▲1.0
Green	Colin Trier	261	8.3	▲1.1
Liberal Democrats	Steven Guy	217	6.9	▲4.4
Plymouth Independents	Grace Stickland	161	5.1	N/A
TUSC	Nigel Buckley	65	2.1	N/A
Majority		642	20.5	▲7.6
Conservative hold		Swing	▲3.8	

=== Devonport ===
Location of Devonport ward

Devonport 2016
Party	Candidate	Votes	%	±%
Labour	Kate Taylor*	1,315	46.2	▼5.8
Conservative	Sandy Borthwick	630	22.1	▲4.5
UKIP	Michael Ellison	615	21.6	▲2.9
Green	Andrew Pratt	101	3.6	▼1.1
Liberal Democrats	Fleur Ball	92	3.2	▼3.8
Plymouth Independents	Scott Wardle	55	1.9	N/A
TUSC	Simon Gomery	37	1.3	N/A
Majority		685	24.1	▼10.2
Labour hold		Swing	▼5.1	

=== Efford and Lipson ===
Location of Efford and Lipson ward

Efford and Lipson 2016
Party	Candidate	Votes	%	±%
Labour	Brian Vincent*	1,757	60.7	▼4.4
Conservative	George Davis	561	19.4	▲3.1
Plymouth Independents	Terry Luscombe	336	11.6	N/A
TUSC	Hannah Marie Lewis	130	4.5	N/A
Liberal Democrats	Rafiqul Mazed	109	3.8	N/A
Majority		1196	41.3	▼7.6
Labour hold		Swing	▼3.8	

=== Eggbuckland ===
Location of Eggbuckland ward

Eggbuckland 2016
Party	Candidate	Votes	%	±%
Conservative	Heath Cook	1,523	41.0	▲3.2
Labour	Paul McNamara	1,023	27.5	▼12.0
UKIP	Hugh Davies	833	22.4	▼0.3
Liberal Democrats	Richard Simpson	123	3.3	N/A
Plymouth Independents	Chris Treise	107	2.9	N/A
Green	Sam Down	84	2.3	N/A
TUSC	Lesley Duncan	22	0.6	N/A
Majority		500	13.5	N/A
Conservative gain from Labour		Swing	▲7.6	

=== Ham ===
Location of Ham ward

Ham 2016
Party	Candidate	Votes	%	±%
Labour	Tina Tuohy*	1,271	45.0	▼13.6
UKIP	Stuart Charles	687	24.3	▲1.1
Conservative	Dean Seddon	592	20.9	▲2.7
Liberal Democrats	Matthew Radmore	127	4.5	N/A
Plymouth Independents	Jason Shopland	87	3.1	N/A
TUSC	Ryan Aldred	63	2.2	N/A
Majority		584	20.7	▼14.7
Labour hold		Swing	▼7.4	

=== Honicknowle ===
Location of Honicknowle ward

Honicknowle 2016
Party	Candidate	Votes	%	±%
Labour	Pete Smith*	1,261	42.3	▼13.8
UKIP	Nikki Bale	966	32.4	▲6.7
Conservative	Sally Walker	582	19.5	▲6.3
Liberal Democrats	Dylan Morris	88	3.0	N/A
Plymouth Independents	Carl Evans	56	1.9	N/A
TUSC	Joshua Gray	28	0.9	N/A
Majority		295	9.9	▼20.5
Labour hold		Swing	▼10.2	

=== Moor View ===
Location of Moor View ward

Moor View 2016
Party	Candidate	Votes	%	±%
Labour	Chris Mavin	1,220	37.3	▼14.1
Conservative	Bethan Roberts	1134	34.7	▲6.9
UKIP	Philip Partridge	654	20.0	▲2.7
Liberal Democrats	Richard Bray	126	3.9	▲0.3
Plymouth Independents	Arthur Watson	111	3.4	N/A
TUSC	Keith Low	27	0.8	N/A
Majority		86	2.6	▼21.0
Labour hold		Swing	▼10.5	

=== Peverell ===
Location of Peverell ward

Peverell 2016
Party	Candidate	Votes	%	±%
Conservative	Tony Carson	1,582	42.2	▲4.8
Labour	Jeremy Goslin	1,314	35.0	▲0.8
Liberal Democrats	Charlotte Radmore	337	9.0	▲3.6
Plymouth Independents	Peter Brooksbank	253	6.7	N/A
Green	Wendy Miller	223	5.9	▼2.2
TUSC	Justin Pollard	42	1.1	N/A
Majority		268	7.1	▲4.1
Conservative hold		Swing	▲2.0	

=== Plympton Chaddlewood ===
Location of Plympton Chaddlewood ward

Plympton Chaddlewood 2016
Party	Candidate	Votes	%	±%
Conservative	Samantha Leaves	786	50.2	▲6.0
UKIP	Jonathan Frost	376	24.0	▼1.8
Labour	Connor Smart	373	23.8	▼6.2
TUSC	Teresa Stuart	33	2.1	N/A
Majority		410	26.1	▲12.0
Conservative hold		Swing	▲3.9	

=== Plympton Erle ===
Location of Plympton Erle ward

Plympton Erle 2016
Party	Candidate	Votes	%	±%
Conservative	Ian Darcy*	1,105	48.6	▲10.6
Labour	Janet Denise Wise	731	32.1	▲0.9
Plymouth Independents	Peter Endean	205	9.0	N/A
Liberal Democrats	Christianne Pollock	130	5.7	▼4.8
TUSC	Louise Alldridge	103	4.5	N/A
Majority		374	16.4	▲9.6
Conservative hold		Swing	▲4.8	

=== Plympton St Mary ===
Location of Plympton St Mary ward

Plympton St Mary 2016
Party	Candidate	Votes	%	±%
Conservative	Andrea Loveridge	2,318	68.0	▲23.3
Labour	Roger Williams	883	25.9	▼4.1
TUSC	Tom Nally	209	6.1	N/A
Majority		1435	42.1	▲27.4
Conservative hold		Swing	▲13.7	

=== Plymstock Dunstone ===
Location of Plymstock Dunstone ward

Plymstock Dunstone 2016
Party	Candidate	Votes	%	±%
Conservative	Kevin Wigens*	1,594	45.1	+1.2
UKIP	David Salmon	1,037	29.4	▼3.1
Labour	Dena Rafati	585	16.6	▼7.0
Liberal Democrats	Sima Davarian-Dehsorkhe	253	7.2	N/A
TUSC	Roxy Castell	63	1.8	N/A
Majority		557	15.8	+4.3
Conservative hold		Swing	▲2.1	

=== Plymstock Radford ===
Location of Plymstock Radford ward

Plymstock Radford 2016
Party	Candidate	Votes	%	±%
Conservative	Michael Leaves*	1,441	41.0	+3.1
UKIP	John Wheeler	1,077	30.6	+0.8
Labour	Vince Barry	664	18.9	▼8.1
Liberal Democrats	Jeffrey Hall	158	4.5	▼0.5
Green	Connor Clarke	154	4.4	N/A
TUSC	Thomas Sloman	22	0.6	N/A
Majority		364	10.4	+2.3
Conservative hold		Swing	▲1.2	

=== Southway ===
Location of Southway ward

Southway 2016
Party	Candidate	Votes	%	±%
Labour	Lorraine Parker*	1,223	36.1	▼15.2
Conservative	Rebecca Smith	1,135	33.5	+6.6
UKIP	Bill Wakeham	645	19.0	▼2.8
Plymouth Independents	Natasha Squires	224	6.6	N/A
Green	Daniel Sheaff	76	2.2	N/A
Liberal Democrats	Storm Norman	56	1.7	N/A
TUSC	Nik Brookson	30	0.8	N/A
Majority		88	2.6	▼21.8
Labour hold		Swing	▼10.9	

=== St Budeaux ===
Location of St Budeaux ward

St Budeaux 2016
Party	Candidate	Votes	%	±%
Labour	Darren Winter	1,186	42.8	▼18.2
UKIP	Margaret Storer	659	23.8	+3.9
Conservative	Dan Bothwick	598	21.6	+5.8
Plymouth Independents	Adam Duffield	115	4.2	N/A
Liberal Democrats	Stephen Luscombe	102	3.7	+0.4
Green	Stan Beal	81	2.9	N/A
TUSC	Aaron Smith	28	1.0	N/A
Majority		527	19.0	▼22.1
Labour hold		Swing	▲11.1	

=== St Peter and the Waterfront ===
Location of St Peter and the Waterfront ward

St Peter and the Waterfront 2016
Party	Candidate	Votes	%	±%
Labour	Ian Tuffin*	1,263	41.3	▼8.4
Conservative	Karen Thurston	844	27.6	▼0.1
UKIP	John Smith	503	16.4	+1.2
Green	Jessica Horner	209	6.8	N/A
Liberal Democrats	Hugh Janes	174	5.7	▼1.7
TUSC	Bob Brice	66	2.1	N/A
Majority		419	13.7	▼8.3
Labour hold		Swing	▼4.2	

=== Stoke ===
Location of Stoke ward

Stoke 2016
Party	Candidate	Votes	%	±%
Labour	Sam Davey*	1,645	49.5	+3.0
Conservative	Andrew Ford	964	29.0	▼6.0
UKIP	Ramon Fereday	506	15.2	+2.4
Liberal Democrats	Helen Guy	209	6.3	+0.6
Majority		681	20.5	+9.0
Labour hold		Swing	▲4.5	

=== Sutton and Mount Gould ===
Location of Sutton and Mount Gould ward

Sutton and Mount Gould 2016
Party	Candidate	Votes	%	±%
Labour	Eddie Rennie*	1,413	48.8	▼2.6
Conservative	Edmund Shillabeer	589	20.3	▼0.2
UKIP	Jonquil Webber	434	15.0	+0.3
Liberal Democrats	Peter York	177	6.1	+1.6
Green	Daniel van Cleak	166	5.7	▼0.1
Plymouth Independents	Andy Kerswell	80	2.8	N/A
TUSC	Louise Parker	36	1.2	▼1.9
Majority		824	28.5	▼2.4
Labour hold		Swing	▼1.2	

== Aftermath ==
After the election, the Conservatives and Labour held twenty-seven seats on the council each, with the other three held by UKIP councillors. Labour group leader Tudor Evans had led the council before the election, but the result cast control of the council into doubt. A coalition between the Conservatives and UKIP took control, with Conservative group leader Ian Bowyer becoming the new leader of the council.
