= 2010 Plymouth City Council election =

2010 UK local government election

- 6 May 2010

20 of the 57 seats to Plymouth City Council 29 seats needed for a majority
	First party	Second party	Third party
Leader	Vivien Pengelly	Tudor Evans	None
Party	Conservative	Labour	Independent
Last election	37	20	0
Seats before	37	18	2
Seats won	11	9	0
Seats after	36	20	1
Seat change	▼1	▲2	▼1
Popular vote	38,972	32,767	2,024
Percentage	35.4%	29.8%	1.8%
- Map showing the results of contested wards in the 2010 Plymouth City Council elections.
Council control before election
Conservative
Council control after election
Conservative

The 2010 Plymouth City Council election was held on 6 May 2010 to elect members of Plymouth City Council in England.

The Conservative Party remained in control of the council with a reduced majority.

== Background ==
Plymouth City Council held local elections on 6 May 2010 along with councils across the United Kingdom as part of the 2010 local elections. The council elects its councillors in thirds, with nineteen being up for election every year for three years, with no election in the fourth year.

Councillors defending their seats were previously elected in 2006. In that election, twelve Conservative candidates and seven Labour candidates were elected. This election followed a by-election in Ham, which resulted in a Labour hold.

The Conservative Party had control of the council ahead of this election, with 37 councillors and a majority of eight seats.

The Conservatives were defending 12 seats, the Labour Party 6 and the former Labour candidate, Andy Kerswell, was defending his seat in Efford and Lipson as an independent.

If the Labour Party was to regain the majority they held on the council until 2006, they needed to gain 11 seats, which they failed to do, although made two gains (one against a Conservative and the other against Andy Kerswell) despite a national swing against them.

== Overall results ==
2010 Plymouth City Council Election
Party	Seats	Gains	Losses	Net gain/loss	Seats %	Votes %	Votes	+/−
Conservative	11	0	1	▼1	55.0	35.4	38,972	▼4.2
Labour	9	1	0	▲1	45.0	29.8	32,767	▼0.1
Liberal Democrats	0	0	0	Steady	0.0	20.9	23,031	▲1.4
UKIP	0	0	0	Steady	0.0	9.8	10,792	▲3.5
Green	0	0	0	Steady	0.0	2.0	2,170	▼2.0
Independent	0	0	0	Steady	0.0	1.8	2,024	▼0.7
BNP	0	0	0	Steady	0.0	0.3	312	New
Vivamus	0	0	0	Steady	0.0	0.0	23	New
Total	20						110,091	

Note: All changes in vote share are in comparison to the corresponding 2006 election.

== Seats up for election in 2010 ==
Gains are shown by highlighting in the winning party's colours, comparing them to when these councillors were last up for election in 2006.

Ward	Previous Councillor (2006)	Previous Party (2006)	Winning Councillor	Winning Party
Budshead	Grant Monahan	Conservative	Grant Monahan	Conservative
Compton	Ted Fry	Conservative	Ted Fry	Conservative
Devonport	William Stevens	Labour Co-operative	William Stevens	Labour Co-operative
Drake	Steven Ricketts	Conservative	Steven Ricketts	Conservative
Efford and Lipson	Andy Kerswell	Labour Co-operative (later independent)	David Haydon and Pauline Murphy	Labour
Eggbuckland	Ian Bowyer	Conservative	Ian Bowyer	Conservative
Ham	Ian Gordon	Labour	Ian Gordon	Labour
Honicknowle	Pauline Purnell	Labour	Nicky Williams	Labour
Moor View	Michael Foster	Conservative	Mike Wright	Labour
Peverell	Martin Leaves	Conservative	Martin Leaves	Conservative
Plympton Chaddlewood	Glenn Jordan	Conservative	Glenn Jordan	Conservative
Plympton St Mary	David James	Conservative	David James	Conservative
Plymstock Dunstone	VivienPengelly	Conservative	VivienPengelly	Conservative
Plymstock Radford	Wendy Foster	Conservative	Wendy Foster	Conservative
St Budeaux	Sally Letcher	Labour	Sally Bowie (née Letcher)	Labour
St Peter and The Waterfront	Sue McDonald	Labour	Sue McDonald	Labour
Southway	James Kirk	Labour Co-operative	Tom Browne	Conservative
Stoke	Jill Dolan	Conservative	Jill Dolan	Conservative
Sutton and Mount Gould	Mary Aspinall	Labour Co-operative	Mary Aspinall	Labour Co-operative

== Ward results ==
=== Budshead ===
Location of Budshead ward

Budshead 2010
Party	Candidate	Votes	%
Conservative	Grant Monahan	2,077	36.2%
Labour	Mike Fox	2,012	35.1%
Liberal Democrats	Mathew Beynon	1,024	17.9%
UKIP	Thelma Dinham	623	10.9%
Majority		65	1.1%
Turnout		5,736	60.1%
Conservative hold			

=== Compton ===
Location of Compton ward

Compton 2010
Party	Candidate	Votes	%
Conservative	Ted Fry	2,698	41.9%
Liberal Democrats	Steven Smith	1,560	24.2%
Labour	Chaz Singh	1,358	21.1%
UKIP	Michael Cooke	545	8.5%
Green	Josie Bannon	278	4.3%
Majority		1,138	17.7%
Turnout		6,439	68.2%
Conservative hold			

=== Devonport ===
Location of Devonport ward

Devonport 2010
Party	Candidate	Votes	%
Labour	William Stevens	1,820	36.0%
Conservative	Betty Gray	1,461	28.9%
Liberal Democrats	John Brooks	1,074	21.2%
UKIP	Syd Brooks	573	11.3%
Green	Andrew Pratt	127	2.5%
Majority		359	7.1%
Turnout		5,055	54.0%
Labour hold			

=== Drake ===
Location of Drake ward

Drake 2010
Party	Candidate	Votes	%
Conservative	Steven Ricketts	984	34.6%
Liberal Democrats	Rebecca Trimnell	832	29.2%
Labour	John Smith	613	21.5%
Green	Colin Trier	170	6.0%
UKIP	Michael Ellison	159	5.6%
Independent	Sam Remmer	89	3.1%
Majority		152	5.3%
Turnout		2,847	55.2%
Conservative hold			

=== Efford and Lipson ===
Location of Efford and Lipson ward

Efford and Lipson 2010
Party	Candidate	Votes	%
Labour	David Haydon	1,950	
Labour	Pauline Murphy	1,903	
Conservative	Andy Ford	1,387	
Conservative	Mary Orchard	1,219	
Liberal Democrats	Elsie Clark	1,201	
Liberal Democrats	Rebecca Tidy	1,072	
UKIP	David Salmon	641	
Independent	Andy Kerswell	357	
Green	Alison Green	333	
Independent	Margaret Storer	110	
Turnout		10,173	57.8%
Labour hold			

=== Eggbuckland ===
Location of Eggbuckland ward

Eggbuckland 2010
Party	Candidate	Votes	%
Conservative	Ian Bowyer	2,691	38.7%
Labour	Ken Morrish	1,969	28.3%
Liberal Democrats	Emma Pedlar	1,256	18.1%
UKIP	Roger Thomas	625	9.0%
Independent	Lee Finn	405	5.8%
Majority		722	10.4%
Turnout		6,946	67.6%
Conservative hold			

=== Ham ===
Location of Ham ward

Ham 2010
Party	Candidate	Votes	%
Labour	Ian Gordon	2,252	40.3%
Conservative	Bethan Roberts	1,434	25.7%
Liberal Democrats	Stewart Campbell	920	16.5%
UKIP	John Read	717	12.8%
Independent	Mark West	164	2.9%
Green	Colin Bannon	96	1.7%
Majority		818	14.7%
Turnout		5,583	57.8%
Labour hold			

=== Honicknowle ===
Location of Honicknowle ward

Honicknowle 2010
Party	Candidate	Votes	%
Labour	Nicky Williams	2,407	43.2%
Conservative	Paul Rielly	1,265	22.7%
Liberal Democrats	Stephen Goldthorp	920	16.5%
UKIP	Stephen Hoffman	663	11.9%
BNP	Roy Cook	312	5.6%
Majority		1,142	20.5%
Turnout		5,567	55.4%
Labour hold			

=== Moor View ===
Location of Moor View ward

Moor View 2010
Party	Candidate	Votes	%
Labour	Mike Wright	2,206	36.8%
Conservative	Michael Foster	1,966	32.8%
Liberal Democrats	Andrew Campbell	1,123	18.7%
UKIP	Herbert Sandford	591	9.9%
Green	Nicola Bannon	109	1.8%
Majority		240	4.0%
Turnout		5,995	64.7%
Labour gain from Conservative			

=== Peverell ===
Location of Peverell ward

Peverell 2010
Party	Candidate	Votes	%
Conservative	Martin Leaves	2,871	40.0%
Labour	Jon Taylor	1,782	24.8%
Liberal Democrats	Emma Swann	1,769	24.6%
UKIP	Christopher Vitali	465	6.5%
Green	Gavin Fennell	270	3.8%
Vivamus	Bernard Toolan	23	0.3%
Majority		1,089	15.2%
Turnout		7,180	71.2%
Labour hold			

=== Plympton Chaddlewood ===
Location of Plympton Chaddlewood ward

Plympton Chaddlewood 2010
Party	Candidate	Votes	%
Conservative	Glenn Jordan	1,816	45.9%
Liberal Democrats	Michael Symons	970	24.5%
Labour	Val Burns	781	19.7%
UKIP	Jonathan Frost	393	9.9%
Majority		846	21.4%
Turnout		3,960	64.1%
Conservative hold			

=== Plympton St Mary ===
Location of Plympton St Mary ward

Plympton St Mary 2010
Party	Candidate	Votes	%
Conservative	David James	3,597	50.8%
Liberal Democrats	Catherine Symons	1,427	20.1%
Labour	Ross Burns	1,424	20.1%
UKIP	Bill Baser	639	9.0%
Majority		2,170	30.6%
Turnout		7,087	70.3%
Conservative hold			

=== Plymstock Dunstone ===
Location of Plymstock Dunstone ward

Plymstock Dunstone 2010
Party	Candidate	Votes	%
Conservative	Vivien Pengelly	3,363	48.5%
Liberal Democrats	Richard Smith	1,578	22.7%
Labour	Roger Williams	1,235	17.8%
UKIP	Alan Skuse	763	11.0%
Majority		1,785	25.7%
Turnout		6,939	70.6%
Conservative hold			

=== Plymstock Radford ===
Location of Plymstock Radford ward

Plymstock Radford 2010
Party	Candidate	Votes	%
Conservative	Wendy Foster	2,681	40.2%
Liberal Democrats	Ian Veater	1,463	21.9%
Labour	Steven Lemin	1,092	16.4%
Independent	Roger Dodd	828	12.4%
UKIP	Roger Bullock	613	9.2%
Majority		1,218	18.2%
Turnout		6,677	68.3%
Conservative hold			

=== St Budeaux ===
Location of St Budeaux ward

St Budeaux 2010
Party	Candidate	Votes	%
Labour	Sally Bowie	2,226	40.8%
Conservative	Frederick Brimacombe	1,450	26.6%
Liberal Democrats	Bailey Sam	905	16.6%
UKIP	Paul Bedson	696	12.7%
Green	Nick Byrne	105	1.9%
Independent	Paul Colwill	79	1.4%
Majority		776	14.2%
Turnout		5,461	63.9%
Labour hold			

=== St Peter and the Waterfront ===
Location of St Peter and the Waterfront ward

St Peter and the Waterfront 2010
Party	Candidate	Votes	%
Labour	Sue McDonald	1,689	33.8%
Conservative	Carol Ellmers	1,525	30.5%
Liberal Democrats	Hugh Janes	1,096	21.9%
UKIP	Sean O'Kane	398	8.0%
Green	Matt Slaughter	190	3.8%
Independent	Ray Rees	102	2.0%
Majority		164	3.3%
Turnout		5,000	56.9%
Labour hold			

=== Southway ===
Location of Southway ward

Southway 2010
Party	Candidate	Votes	%
Conservative	Thomas Browne	2,183	36.1%
Labour	David Weekes	2,160	35.7%
Liberal Democrats	Marion Roch	1,029	17.0%
UKIP	Fern Burgess	678	11.2%
Majority		23	0.4%
Turnout		6,050	52.8%
Conservative hold			

=== Stoke ===
Location of Stoke ward

Stoke 2010
Party	Candidate	Votes	%
Conservative	Jill Dolan	2,030	33.9%
Labour	Philippa Davey	1,880	31.4%
Liberal Democrats	Paul Brown-Church	1,335	22.3%
UKIP	John Elliott	542	9.0%
Green	Wendy Miller	209	3.5%
Majority		150	2.5%
Turnout		5,996	64.6%
Conservative hold			

=== Sutton and Mount Gould ===
Location of Sutton and Mount Gould ward

Sutton and Mount Gould 2010
Party	Candidate	Votes	%
Labour	Mary Aspinall	1,911	33.5%
Liberal Democrats	Peter York	1,549	27.2%
Conservative	Edmund Shillabeer	1,493	26.2%
UKIP	Jonquil Webber	468	8.2%
Green	Tean Mitchell	283	5.0%
Majority		362	6.3%
Turnout		5,704	57.6%
Labour hold			

== See also ==
- List of wards in Plymouth
