= Tudor Evans =

British Labour Co-operative politician

Cllr Tudor Evans OBE

Leader of Plymouth City Council
- Incumbent
- Assumed office May 2023
- Deputy: Jemima Laing
- Preceded by: Mark Shayer
- In office 18 May 2018 – 21 May 2021
- Preceded by: Ian Bowyer
- Succeeded by: Nick Kelly
- In office 18 May 2012 – 20 May 2016
- Preceded by: Vivien Pengelly
- Succeeded by: Ian Bowyer
- In office May 2003 – May 2007
- Preceded by: Kevin Wigens
- Succeeded by: Vivien Pengelly
- In office May 1998 – May 2000
- Preceded by: John Ingham
- Succeeded by: Patrick Nicholson

Member of the National Executive Committee of the Labour Party
- In office November 2022 – November 2024

Plymouth City Councillor for Ham ward
- Incumbent
- Assumed office 5 May 1988

Personal details
- Born: May 1959 Ebbw Vale
- Party: Labour Co-op
- Education: University of Plymouth

Tudor Evans OBE is a British Labour Co-op politician who has been the leader of Plymouth City Council five times, including since May 2023. He has been a councillor for Ham ward since 1988 and has led the Labour group on Plymouth City Council since 1998. He has previously served as leader of the council from 1998 to 2000, 2003 to 2007, 2012 to 2016, and 2018 to 2021.

From 2022 to 2024 he was a member of the Labour Party's governing body, the National Executive Committee

== Early life ==
Evans was born in Ebbw Vale in Wales. He moved to Plymouth as an undergraduate, studying environmental science. He was a director of a co-operative printing company for thirteen years, and works as a local government consultant.

== Political career ==
Evans first stood for election to Plymouth City Council in 1987 in Sutton and Mount Gould ward, losing to SDP–Liberal Alliance candidates. He was subsequently elected as a councillor to Ham ward in 1988, a seat he has held ever since.

After the 1998 local election, the Labour group leader John Ingham stood down, having led the council for seven years. Evans put himself forward as a candidate lead the Labour group against fellow councillors Chris Mavin and David Millar. Evans was elected, saying he wanted to prioritise investment, jobs and the tourism industry. He led the council until 2000, when the Conservatives won a majority of seats on the council.

Evans became council leader again in 2003, crediting his victory to Conservative plans to close old people's homes. When Labour lost its majority in 2007, he said he was "proud of what [his] council has achieved", but "puzzled" at having lost control.

Labour again took control of the council in 2012, with the defeated Conservative council leader Vivien Pengelly blaming a cut in the top rate of income tax and the proposed pasty tax from the Conservative chancellor of the Exchequer George Osborne's budget. Evans again returned as council leader on a platform including job creation, webcasting council meetings, and trying to stop the construction of an incinerator. He said he was not opposed to the incinerator, but to the planned location. In 2013, the council established an energy co-operative called Plymouth Energy Community. In 2014, he was a signatory to an open letter to The Observer calling for an end to cuts to local government. He advocated for Plymouth to be included in a national policy of compensation for businesses affected by flooding.

The party lost control after the 2015 election, which left the council under no overall control. Evans initially remained council leader. He was removed from that post after the 2016 local elections, with local UK Independence Party councillors forming a coalition with the Conservatives and later defecting to them. During this time, Evans supported a cross-party campaign for Plymouth to retain its warships.

After Labour restored its majority in the 2018 council election, Evans returned as council leader with a manifesto including pledges to create a thousand new parking spaces and to construct new low-cost homes. Evans opposed plans to merge Devon and Cornwall Police with Dorset Police. Labour lost the 2021 council election, and Evans was replaced by the Conservative councillor Nick Kelly as council leader.

In 2022, Evans successfully ran for a position on the Labour Party National Executive Committee as a Councillor representative. He did not run for re-election in 2024.

Labour regained control of the council in the 2023 council election. Evans returned as council leader.

== Honours and awards ==
Evans was named council leader of the year in 2015. He was made an Officer of the Order of the British Empire for services to politics and local government in January 2016.

== Elections contested ==
Date	Council	Ward	Party	Votes	% votes	Place	Ref
1987	Plymouth City Council	Mount Gould	Labour	911	22.4 (party)	7th	
1988 by-election	Plymouth City Council	Ham	Labour	?	?	1st	
1991	Plymouth City Council	Ham	Labour	2,650	68.5 (party)	3rd	
1995	Plymouth City Council	Ham	Labour	2,142	73.6 (party)	2nd	
1997	Plymouth City Council	Ham	Labour	2,142	60.7 (party)	2nd	
1997	Plymouth City Council	Ham	Labour	2,142	60.7 (party)	2nd	
2000	Plymouth City Council	Ham	Labour	1,150	50.0 (party)	1st	
2003	Plymouth City Council	Ham	Labour	1,912	62.9 (party)	1st	
2003	Plymouth City Council	Ham	Labour	1,912	62.9 (party)	1st	
2007	Plymouth City Council	Ham	Labour	1,460	44.4	1st	
2007	Plymouth City Council	Ham	Labour	1,460	44.4	1st	
2011	Plymouth City Council	Ham	Labour	1,843	54.7	1st	
2015	Plymouth City Council	Ham	Labour	2,176	38.6	1st	
2019	Plymouth City Council	Ham	Labour	1,441	45.9	1st	
2023	Plymouth City Council	Ham	Labour	1,390	47.3	1st	

Political offices
Preceded by John Ingham	Leader of Plymouth City Council; 1998–2000	Succeeded by Patrick Nicholson
Preceded by Kevin Wigens	Leader of Plymouth City Council; 2003–2007	Succeeded by Vivien Pengelly
Preceded by Vivien Pengelly	Leader of Plymouth City Council; 2012–2016	Succeeded by Ian Bowyer
Preceded by Ian Bowyer	Leader of Plymouth City Council; 2018–present	Incumbent
