= 2024 Plymouth City Council election =

| ← 2023 | 2 May 2024 | 2026 → |

19 of the 57 seats to Plymouth City Council 29 seats needed for a majority

| | First party | Second party |
|---|---|---|
| Leader | Tudor Evans | None |
| Party | Labour | Independent |
| Last election | 31 | 5 |
| Seats before | 33 | 7 |
| Seats won | 15 | 2 |
| Seats after | 42 | 6 |
| Seat change | ▲9 | ▼1 |
| Popular vote | 26,719 | 3,428 |
| Percentage | 43.6% | 5.6% |
| | Third party | Fourth party |
| Leader | Andy Lugger | Lauren McLay |
| Party | Conservative | Green |
| Last election | 18 | 2 |
| Seats before | 15 | 2 |
| Seats won | 1 | 1 |
| Seats after | 7 | 2 |
| Seat change | ▼8 | Steady |
| Popular vote | 14,617 | 5,620 |
| Percentage | 23.9% | 9.2% |
- Map showing the results of contested wards in the 2024 Plymouth City Council elections.
Leader before election
Tudor Evans
Labour
Leader after election
Tudor Evans
Labour

The 2024 Plymouth City Council election took place on 2 May 2024 to elect members of Plymouth City Council in Devon, England. It was held alongside other local elections across the United Kingdom.

Labour gained seats at the expense of the Conservatives, increasing Labour's overall majority on the council.

== Background ==
=== History ===
Result of the council election when these seats were last contested in 2021

Result of the most recent council election in 2023

The council elects its councillors in thirds, with a third of seats being up for election every year for three years, with no election each fourth year to correspond with councillors' four-year terms. Councillors defending their seats in this election were previously elected in 2021, which had been delayed by a year due to the COVID-19 pandemic. In that election, fourteen Conservative candidates and five Labour candidates were elected.

Elections in Plymouth are usually competitive between the Labour Party and the Conservative Party. The council was controlled by the Labour Party from the 2018 council election until the 2021 council election, when the council entered no overall control, with no party holding a majority of seats. Several Conservative councillors were suspended or resigned from their party, and the Conservative council leader Nick Kelly was replaced by Richard Bingley after Kelly lost a confidence vote in February 2022. Some former Conservative councillors rejoined their former group after the 2022 council election, giving the party an overall majority on 17 May 2022. Kelly resigned from the Conservative group on 15 October 2022 after being suspended, returning the council to no overall control. Several other councillors resigned from the Conservative group with some forming a group called the Independent Alliance, led by Kelly and also including the former Labour councillor Chaz Singh.

The Conservative council leader Richard Bingley signed an executive decision to approve the felling of 110 mature trees in Plymouth City Centre in March 2023, as part of longstanding plans to regenerate the city centre. The decision was legally challenged and criticised. He resigned as council leader the following week.

Labour won fifteen seats in the subsequent 2023 council election, winning overall control of the council. The Conservatives won only one seat, while independent candidates who had been members of the Independent Alliance group won in Plympton and the former Conservative councillor Steve Ricketts was elected as an independent candidate in Drake ward.

=== Developments since 2023 ===
==== Defections and suspensions ====
The Conservative councillor Philip Partridge left the Conservative group to form a new "Free Independents" group led by Ricketts. The independent Plympton councillors formed an "Independent Group". Andrea Loveridge left the Conservative group in December 2023 to sit as an independent councillor.

==== Efford and Lipson by-election ====
The Labour councillor Brian Vincent died in April 2023, having first being elected in 1997 and having served continuously as a councillor since 2006.

The Labour candidate Paul McNamara won the ensuing by-election on 15 June.

Efford and Lipson by-election
| Party | Candidate | Votes | % | ±% |
|---|---|---|---|---|
| Labour | Paul McNamara | 1,204 | 58.8 | ▲6.7 |
| Conservative | Will Jones | 423 | 20.6 | ▼15.6 |
| Green | Pat Bushell | 196 | 9.6 | ▲2.3 |
| Liberal Democrats | Alexander Primmer | 80 | 3.9 | ▲0.8 |
| Independent | Chaz Singh | 69 | 3.4 | N/A |
| Heritage | Darryl Ingram | 54 | 2.6 | N/A |
| TUSC | Neil Prentice | 23 | 1.1 | ▼0.3 |
| Turnout | | 2,049 | 20.2 | ▼12.5 |
| Labour hold | | Swing | 11.2 | |

==== July 2023 by-elections ====
In June 2023, the Conservative councillor and former council leader Vivien Pengelly died and the Labour councillor Sue McDonald resigned due to family health reasons. Both ensuing by-elections took place on 27 July 2023. The Labour candidate Stefan Kirzanac won Pengelly's Plymstock Dunstone seat and the former MP Alison Raynsford retained McDonald's St Peter and the Waterfront seat for the Labour Party.

Plymstock Dunstone by-election
| Party | Candidate | Votes | % | ±% |
|---|---|---|---|---|
| Labour | Stefan Krizanac | 1,072 | 33.2 | ▼6.5 |
| Conservative | Julie Hunt | 919 | 28.4 | ▼20.7 |
| Liberal Democrats | Peter Edwards | 596 | 18.4 | ▲12.4 |
| Independent | Grace Stickland | 480 | 14.9 | N/A |
| Green | Bruce Robinson | 97 | 3.0 | ▼1.9 |
| Heritage | Darryl Ingram | 55 | 1.7 | N/A |
| TUSC | Jackie Hilton | 12 | 0.4 | N/A |
| Turnout | | 3,231 | 32.0 | ▼6.6 |
| Labour gain from Conservative | | Swing | 7.1 | |

St Peter and the Waterfront by-election
| Party | Candidate | Votes | % | ±% |
|---|---|---|---|---|
| Labour | Alison Raynsford | 1,126 | 48.0 | ▼8.1 |
| Conservative | Ian Fleming | 488 | 20.8 | ▼9.0 |
| Green | Shayna Newham-Joynes | 206 | 8.8 | N/A |
| Liberal Democrats | Hugh Janes | 175 | 7.5 | ▲1.5 |
| Reform UK | Andy Gibbons | 174 | 7.4 | N/A |
| Independent candidate | Chaz Singh | 126 | 5.4 | N/A |
| TUSC | Ryan Aldred | 52 | 2.2 | ▼0.8 |
| Turnout | | 2,347 | 18.6 | ▼9.9 |
| Labour hold | | Swing | ▲0.5 | |

== Council composition ==
Council composition after the 2023 council election

Council composition ahead of the 2024 council election

| After 2023 election | | Before 2024 election | | After 2024 election | |
| Party | Seats | Party | Seats | Party | Seats |
|---|---|---|---|---|---|
| Labour | 31 | Labour | 33 | Labour | 42 |
| Conservative | 18 | Conservative | 15 | Conservative | 7 |
| Independent | 5 | Independent | 7 | Independent | 6 |
| Green | 2 | Green | 2 | Green | 2 |
| Vacant | 1 | | | | |

== Results ==
=== Overall ===
2024 Plymouth City Council election
| Party | This election | | | Full council | | | This election | | |
| Party | Seats | Net | Seats % | Other | Total | Total % | Votes | Votes % | +/− |
|---|---|---|---|---|---|---|---|---|---|
| Labour | 15 | ▲9 | 78.9 | 27 | 42 | 73.7 | 26,719 | 43.6 | ▲9.7 |
| Independent | 2 | ▼1 | 10.5 | 4 | 6 | 10.5 | 3,428 | 5.6 | ▲2.3 |
| Conservative | 1 | ▼8 | 5.3 | 6 | 7 | 12.3 | 14,617 | 23.9 | ▼26.7 |
| Green | 1 | Steady | 5.3 | 1 | 2 | 3.5 | 5,620 | 9.2 | ▲1.7 |
| Reform UK | 0 | Steady | 0.0 | 0 | 0 | 0.0 | 6,200 | 10.1 | N/A |
| Liberal Democrats | 0 | Steady | 0.0 | 0 | 0 | 0.0 | 3,364 | 5.5 | ▲2.4 |
| TUSC | 0 | Steady | 0.0 | 0 | 0 | 0.0 | 1,276 | 2.1 | ▲1.3 |
| Heritage | 0 | Steady | 0.0 | 0 | 0 | 0.0 | 15 | 0.0 | ▼0.1 |

Results for individual wards are listed below.

=== Budshead ===
Budshead
| Party | Candidate | Votes | % | ±% |
|---|---|---|---|---|
| Labour Co-op | Alison Simpson | 1,448 | 45.7 | ▲17.6 |
| Conservative | Jonathan Drean | 1,065 | 33.6 | ▼16.5 |
| Reform UK | Sue Smale | 313 | 9.9 | N/A |
| Liberal Democrats | Jim Spencer | 169 | 5.3 | ▲2.8 |
| Green | Caroline Bennett | 148 | 4.7 | ▲0.1 |
| TUSC | Nik Brookson | 25 | 0.8 | ▲0.2 |
| Majority | | 383 | 12.1 | N/A |
| Turnout | | 3,168 | | |
| Labour Co-op gain from Conservative | | Swing | ▲17.1 | |

=== Compton ===
Compton
| Party | Candidate | Votes | % | ±% |
|---|---|---|---|---|
| Labour Co-op | Matt Smith | 1,708 | 46.4 | ▲9.8 |
| Conservative | Charlote Carlyle* | 1,249 | 33.9 | ▼17.2 |
| Green | Ewan Melling Flavell | 243 | 6.6 | ▲0.1 |
| Reform UK | Charlie Robinson-Hodge | 240 | 6.5 | N/A |
| Liberal Democrats | Richard Bray | 210 | 5.7 | ▲0.8 |
| TUSC | Matthew Whitear | 34 | 0.9 | ▲0.1 |
| Majority | | 459 | 12.5 | N/A |
| Turnout | | 3,684 | | |
| Labour Co-op gain from Conservative | | Swing | ▲13.5 | |

=== Devonport ===
Devonport
| Party | Candidate | Votes | % | ±% |
|---|---|---|---|---|
| Labour | Anne Freeman | 1,573 | 47.1 | ▲6.2 |
| Conservative | Jon Gatward | 429 | 12.8 | ▼25.6 |
| Reform UK | Lee Bunker | 425 | 12.7 | N/A |
| Green | James Dyson | 218 | 6.5 | ▲1.1 |
| Liberal Democrats | Jeffrey Hall | 139 | 4.2 | ▲0.9 |
| TUSC | Alex Moore | 56 | 1.7 | ▲1.0 |
| Majority | | 1,017 | 34.3 | ▲9.5 |
| Turnout | | 3,340 | 30.4 | |
| Labour Co-op hold | | Swing | ▼4.9 | |

=== Efford and Lipson ===
Efford and Lipson
| Party | Candidate | Votes | % | ±% |
|---|---|---|---|---|
| Labour Co-op | Paul McNamara* | 1,593 | 57.7 | ▲5.6 |
| Conservative | Ian Fleming | 380 | 13.8 | ▼22.4 |
| Reform UK | Bill Bertram | 361 | 13.1 | N/A |
| Green | Pat Bushell | 263 | 9.5 | ▲2.2 |
| Liberal Democrats | Alexander Primmer | 140 | 5.1 | ▲2.0 |
| TUSC | Neil Prentice | 24 | 0.9 | ▼0.5 |
| Majority | | 1,213 | 44.0 | ▲28.0 |
| Turnout | | 2,761 | | |
| Labour Co-op hold | | Swing | ▲14.0 | |

=== Eggbuckland ===
Eggbuckland
| Party | Candidate | Votes | % | ±% |
|---|---|---|---|---|
| Conservative | Chris Wood | 1,478 | 43.3 | ▼21.9 |
| Labour Co-op | Virginia Pike | 1,461 | 42.8 | ▲19.5 |
| Liberal Democrats | Dennis Draper | 233 | 6.8 | ▲0.9 |
| Green | Clint Jones | 190 | 5.6 | ▲0.1 |
| TUSC | Bethany Lowe | 51 | 1.5 | N/A |
| Majority | | 17 | 0.5 | ▼41.4 |
| Turnout | | 3,716 | | |
| Conservative hold | | Swing | ▼20.7 | |

=== Ham ===
Ham
| Party | Candidate | Votes | % | ±% |
|---|---|---|---|---|
| Labour Co-op | Kate Taylor | 1,404 | 48.6 | ▲9.4 |
| Independent | Stephen Hulme* | 484 | 16.7 | N/A |
| Conservative | Charlie Carson | 409 | 14.2 | ▼34.1 |
| Reform UK | Chris Hudson | 303 | 10.5 | N/A |
| Liberal Democrats | Stuart Bonar | 134 | 4.6 | N/A |
| Green | Leesa Alderton | 131 | 4.5 | ▼0.6 |
| TUSC | Edward Evans | 25 | 0.9 | ▼0.3 |
| Majority | | | | |
| Turnout | | | | |
| Labour Co-op gain from Conservative | | Swing | | |

=== Honicknowle ===
Honicknowle
| Party | Candidate | Votes | % | ±% |
|---|---|---|---|---|
| Labour Co-op | Ray Morton | 1,440 | 55.2 | ▲12.8 |
| Reform UK | Shaun Hooper | 519 | 19.9 | N/A |
| Conservative | Margaret Boadella | 447 | 17.1 | ▼33.4 |
| Green | Verity Thong | 153 | 5.9 | ▲0.3 |
| TUSC | Louise Alldridge | 49 | 1.9 | ▲0.5 |
| Majority | | | | |
| Turnout | | | | |
| Labour Co-op gain from Conservative | | Swing | | |

=== Moor View ===
Moor View
| Party | Candidate | Votes | % | ±% |
|---|---|---|---|---|
| Labour Co-op | Will Noble* | 1,622 | 48.1 | ▲18.7 |
| Conservative | Andrea Johnson | 929 | 27.6 | ▼35.9 |
| Reform UK | Nicky Cooke | 460 | 13.7 | N/A |
| Liberal Democrats | Richard Simpson | 135 | 4.0 | ▲1.7 |
| Green | Frank Hartkopf | 128 | 3.8 | ▼0.5 |
| Independent | Arthur Watson | 74 | 2.2 | N/A |
| TUSC | Andrew White | 21 | 0.6 | N/A |
| Majority | | | | |
| Turnout | | | | |
| Labour Co-op gain from Conservative | | Swing | | |

=== Peverell ===
Peverell
| Party | Candidate | Votes | % | ±% |
|---|---|---|---|---|
| Labour Co-op | Jamie Bannerman | 2,196 | 51.3 | ▲8.6 |
| Conservative | John Mahony* | 1,295 | 30.3 | ▼14.6 |
| Green | Nicholas Casley | 365 | 8.5 | ▲1.8 |
| Reform UK | Peter Hughes | 218 | 5.1 | N/A |
| Liberal Democrats | Steven Guy | 158 | 3.7 | N/A |
| TUSC | Duncan Moore | 45 | 1.1 | ▲0.5 |
| Majority | | | | |
| Turnout | | | | |
| Labour Co-op gain from Conservative | | Swing | | |

=== Plympton Chaddlewood ===
Plympton Chaddlewood
| Party | Candidate | Votes | % | ±% |
|---|---|---|---|---|
| Green | Lauren McLay* | 1,063 | 53.2 | ▲10.0 |
| Conservative | Ashley Ward | 437 | 21.9 | ▼25.7 |
| Labour | Chris Mavin | 219 | 11.0 | ▲1.8 |
| Reform UK | Vanessa Tyler | 217 | 10.9 | N/A |
| Liberal Democrats | Jacquelie Spencer | 46 | 2.3 | N/A |
| TUSC | Benjamin Davy | 17 | 0.9 | N/A |
| Majority | | | | |
| Turnout | | | | |
| Green gain from Conservative | | Swing | | |

=== Plympton Erle ===
Plympton Erle
| Party | Candidate | Votes | % | ±% |
|---|---|---|---|---|
| Independent | Andrea Loveridge* | 896 | 38.9 | ▼20.3 |
| Labour Co-op | Seb Soper | 483 | 20.9 | ▲5.4 |
| Conservative | Suzanne Glenie | 336 | 14.6 | ▼44.6 |
| Liberal Democrats | Christopher Oram | 235 | 10.2 | ▲7.3 |
| Reform UK | Peter Endean | 221 | 9.6 | N/A |
| Green | Mickey James | 114 | 4.9 | ▼0.8 |
| TUSC | Helen Yeo | 21 | 0.9 | N/A |
| Majority | | | | |
| Turnout | | | | |
| Independent gain from Conservative | | Swing | | |

=== Plympton St Mary ===
Plympton St Mary
| Party | Candidate | Votes | % | ±% |
|---|---|---|---|---|
| Independent | Sally Nicholson | 1,287 | 35.2 | N/A |
| Conservative | Natalie Harrison* | 1,002 | 27.4 | ▼46.3 |
| Labour | Pete Smith | 690 | 18.9 | ▲3.9 |
| Reform UK | Marc Archer | 372 | 10.2 | N/A |
| Green | Byran Driver | 172 | 4.7 | ▼2.1 |
| Liberal Democrats | Cristina Draper | 105 | 2.9 | ▼0.7 |
| TUSC | Alan Frost | 26 | 0.7 | ▼0.1 |
| Majority | | | | |
| Turnout | | | | |
| Independent gain from Conservative | | Swing | | |

=== Plymstock Dunstone ===
Plymstock Dunstone
| Party | Candidate | Votes | % | ±% |
|---|---|---|---|---|
| Labour Co-op | Maria Lawson | 1,410 | 36.0 | ▲5.0 |
| Conservative | David Salmon* | 1,226 | 31.3 | ▼25.6 |
| Liberal Democrats | Peter Edwards | 684 | 17.5 | ▲6.7 |
| Reform UK | Richie Teft | 317 | 8.1 | N/A |
| Independent | Grace Stickland | 120 | 3.1 | N/A |
| Green | Piers Driver | 117 | 3.0 | N/A |
| TUSC | Jackie Hilton | 27 | 0.7 | ▼0.6 |
| Heritage | Darryl Ingram | 15 | 0.4 | N/A |
| Majority | | | | |
| Turnout | | | | |
| Labour Co-op gain from Conservative | | Swing | | |

=== Plymstock Radford ===
Plymstock Radford
| Party | Candidate | Votes | % | ±% |
|---|---|---|---|---|
| Labour Co-op | Daniel Steel | 1,452 | 35.6 | ▲9.0 |
| Conservative | Bill Wakeham* | 1,214 | 29.8 | ▼28.9 |
| Independent | Chaz Singh | 463 | 11.4 | N/A |
| Reform UK | Glenn Linsay | 420 | 10.3 | N/A |
| Green | Bruce Robinson | 333 | 8.2 | ▼0.9 |
| Liberal Democrats | Sara Jennett | 166 | 4.1 | ▼1.6 |
| TUSC | Mathew Bligh | 27 | 0.7 | N/A |
| Majority | | | | |
| Turnout | | | | |
| Labour Co-op gain from Conservative | | Swing | | |

=== Southway ===
Southway
| Party | Candidate | Votes | % | ±% |
|---|---|---|---|---|
| Labour Co-op | Carol Ney | 1,515 | 48.8 | ▲21.2 |
| Conservative | Will Jones | 641 | 20.6 | ▼28.4 |
| Reform UK | Jacqueline Sansom | 556 | 17.9 | N/A |
| Liberal Democrats | Katie McManus | 179 | 5.8 | ▲2.9 |
| Green | Helen McCall | 163 | 5.2 | ▲1.5 |
| TUSC | Tony Bligh | 53 | 1.7 | ▲1.1 |
| Majority | | | | |
| Turnout | | | | |
| Labour Co-op gain from Conservative | | Swing | | |

=== St Budeaux ===
St Budeaux
| Party | Candidate | Votes | % | ±% |
|---|---|---|---|---|
| Labour Co-op | Josh McCarty | 1,064 | 38.7 | ▲3.3 |
| Green | George Wheeler | 787 | 28.6 | ▲22.8 |
| Conservative | Kyle Lewis | 465 | 16.9 | ▼36.1 |
| Reform UK | Rich Bennett | 246 | 8.9 | N/A |
| Independent | Terry Deans | 104 | 3.8 | N/A |
| Liberal Democrats | Stephen Goldthorp | 69 | 2.5 | N/A |
| TUSC | Laurie Moore | 15 | 0.5 | ▼0.8 |
| Majority | | | | |
| Turnout | | | | |
| Labour Co-op gain from Conservative | | Swing | | |

=== St Peter and the Waterfront ===
St Peter and the Waterfront
| Party | Candidate | Votes | % | ±% |
|---|---|---|---|---|
| Labour Co-op | Lewis Allison | 1,777 | 51.6 | ▲9.9 |
| Conservative | Kevin Kelway | 558 | 16.2 | ▼21.9 |
| Reform UK | Andy Gibbons | 457 | 13.3 | N/A |
| Green | Richard Worrall | 345 | 10.0 | ▲0.1 |
| Liberal Democrats | Hugh Janes | 212 | 6.2 | ▲1.4 |
| TUSC | Ryan Aldred | 96 | 2.8 | ▲0.9 |
| Majority | | | | |
| Turnout | | | | |
| Labour Co-op hold | | Swing | | |

=== Stoke ===
Stoke
| Party | Candidate | Votes | % | ±% |
|---|---|---|---|---|
| Labour | Sally Cresswell* | 1,963 | 62.3 | ▲12.5 |
| Conservative | Ehren Duke | 608 | 19.3 | ▼17.3 |
| Green | Lucy Mackay | 342 | 10.9 | ▲3.7 |
| Liberal Democrats | Michael Gillbard | 143 | 4.5 | ▲1.3 |
| TUSC | Lesley Duncan | 94 | 3.0 | ▲2.1 |
| Majority | | | | |
| Turnout | | | | |
| Labour hold | | Swing | | |

=== Sutton and Mount Gould ===
Sutton and Mount Gould
| Party | Candidate | Votes | % | ±% |
|---|---|---|---|---|
| Labour | Chris Cuddihee | 1,701 | 56.4 | ▲4.9 |
| Conservative | Edmund Shillabeer | 449 | 14.9 | ▼18.3 |
| Green | Michael Kewish | 345 | 11.4 | ▼1.5 |
| Reform UK | Jamie Beale | 252 | 8.4 | N/A |
| Liberal Democrats | Fleur Ball | 197 | 6.5 | N/A |
| TUSC | Sita Dhanipersad | 70 | 2.3 | Steady |
| Majority | | | | |
| Turnout | | | | |
| Labour hold | | Swing | | |
