= 2026 Plymouth City Council election =

Local election in Devon, England

- 7 May 2026

19 out of 57 seats to Plymouth City Council 29 seats needed for a majority
- Turnout: 39.6% (▲8.0%)
| | First party | Second party | Third party |
|---|---|---|---|
| Leader | Tudor Evans | Steve Ricketts | None |
| Party | Labour | Reform | Independent |
| Last election | 42 seats, 43.6% | 0 seats, 10.1% | 6 seats, 5.6% |
| Seats before | 39 | 2 | 6 |
| Seats won | 2 | 14 | 0 |
| Seats after | 31 | 16 | 4 |
| Seat change | ▼8 | ▲14 | ▼2 |
| Popular vote | 16,697 | 28,331 | 2,320 |
| Percentage | 21.9% | 37.2% | 3.0% |
| Swing | ▼21.6% | ▲27.1% | ▼2.6% |
| | Fourth party | Fifth party | Sixth party |
| Leader | Lauren McLay | Andy Lugger (retiring) | None |
| Party | Green | Conservative | Liberal Democrats |
| Last election | 2 seats, 9.2% | 7 seats, 23.9% | 0 seats, 5.5% |
| Seats before | 2 | 7 | 1 |
| Seats won | 2 | 1 | 0 |
| Seats after | 3 | 3 | 0 |
| Seat change | ▲1 | ▼4 | ▼1 |
| Popular vote | 12,783 | 11,867 | 3,950 |
| Percentage | 16.8% | 15.6% | 5.2% |
| Swing | ▲7.6% | ▼8.3% | ▼0.3% |
- Winner of each seat at the 2026 Plymouth City Council election.
Leader before election
Tudor Evans
Labour
Leader after election
Tudor Evans
Labour

The 2026 Plymouth City Council election was held on 7 May 2026, alongside the other local elections across the United Kingdom held on the same day, to elect 19 of 57 members of Plymouth City Council.

Labour made a net loss of eight seats at this election, but narrowly retained their majority on the council. Reform UK won 14 of the 19 seats being contested at this election, taking them from having had just two seats prior to the election to being the second largest party on the council.

== Council composition ==
| After 2024 election | | Before 2026 election | |
| Party | Seats | Party | Seats |
|---|---|---|---|
| Labour | 42 | Labour | 39 |
| Conservative | 7 | Conservative | 7 |
| Green | 2 | Green | 2 |
| Reform | 0 | Reform | 2 |
| Liberal Democrats | 0 | Liberal Democrats | 1 |
| Independent | 6 | Independent | 6 (Note: All independent councillors bar Zoe Reilly sit as part of The Independents group.) |

Changes 2024–2026:

- May 2025: Carol Ney (Labour) and Zoe Reilly (Labour) leave party to sit as independents; Dylan Tippetts (Labour) joins Liberal Democrats
- February 2026: Steve Ricketts (Independent) joins Reform
- March 2026: Carol Ney (Independent) joins Reform

== Summary ==
=== Background ===
In 2024, the Labour Party retained control of the council. In 2025, it was reported that the elections were potentially being cancelled. However, this plan was ultimately abandoned in early 2026 after legal challenges.

=== Election result ===
2026 Plymouth City Council election
| Party | This election | | | | Full council | | | This election | | |
| Party | Candidates | Seats | Net | Seats % | Other | Total | Total % | Votes | Votes % | +/− |
|---|---|---|---|---|---|---|---|---|---|---|
| Labour | {{{candidates}}} | 2 | ▼8 | 10.5 | 29 | 31 | 54.4 | 16,697 | 21.9 | –21.6 |
| Reform | {{{candidates}}} | 14 | ▲14 | 73.7 | 2 | 16 | 28.1 | 28,331 | 37.2 | +27.1 |
| Independent | {{{candidates}}} | 0 | ▼2 | 0.0 | 4 | 4 | 7.0 | 2,320 | 3.0 | –2.6 |
| Green | {{{candidates}}} | 2 | ▲1 | 10.5 | 1 | 3 | 5.3 | 12,783 | 16.8 | +7.6 |
| Conservative | {{{candidates}}} | 1 | ▼4 | 5.3 | 2 | 3 | 5.3 | 11,867 | 15.6 | –8.3 |
| Liberal Democrats | {{{candidates}}} | 0 | ▼1 | 0.0 | 0 | 0 | 0.0 | 3,950 | 5.2 | –0.3 |
| TUSC | {{{candidates}}} | 0 | Steady | 0.0 | 0 | 0 | 0.0 | 229 | 0.3 | –1.8 |

== Incumbents ==
| Ward | Incumbent councillor | Party | Re-standing |
|---|---|---|---|
| Budshead | Lee Finn | Conservative | No |
| Compton | Dylan Tippetts | Liberal Democrats | No |
| Devonport | Bill Stevens | Labour | Yes |
| Drake | Charlotte Holloway | Labour | No |
| Efford & Lipson | Neil Hendy | Labour | Yes |
| Eggbuckland | Chip Tofan | Conservative | Yes |
| Ham | Tina Tuohy | Labour | Yes |
| Honicknowle | Zoe Reilly | Independent | Yes (Note: Standing in Plympton Chaddlewood ward as a Green candidate.) |
| Moor View | Maddi Bridgeman | Independent | Yes (Note: Standing in Plympton St Mary ward.) |
| Peverell | Jeremy Goslin | Labour | Yes |
| Plympton Chaddlewood | Ian Poyser | Green | No |
| Plympton St Mary | Ian Darcy | Conservative | No |
| Plymsotck Dunstone | Stefan Krizanac | Labour | No |
| Plymstock Radford | Rebecca Smith | Conservative | No |
| Southway | Andy Lugger | Conservative | Yes |
| St Budeaux | Sally Haydon | Labour | No |
| St Peter & The Waterfront | Alison Raynsford | Labour | Yes |
| Stoke | Tom Briars-Delve | Labour | Yes |
| Sutton & Mount Gould | Mary Aspinall | Labour | Yes |

== Results by ward ==
=== Budshead ===
Budshead
| Party | Candidate | Votes | % | ±% |
|---|---|---|---|---|
| Reform | Nicola Cooke | 1,544 | 40.6 | +30.7 |
| Conservative | Charlie Carson | 633 | 16.6 | –17.0 |
| Independent | Dave Downie | 611 | 16.1 | N/A |
| Labour | Howard Simpson | 513 | 13.5 | –32.2 |
| Green | Hilary Fursdon | 353 | 9.3 | +4.6 |
| Liberal Democrats | Jim Spencer | 149 | 3.9 | –1.4 |
| Majority | | 911 | 24.0 | N/A |
| Turnout | | 3,803 | 37.6 | +5.8 |
| Registered electors | | ~10,109 | | |
| Reform gain from Conservative | | Swing | ▲23.9 | |

=== Compton ===
Compton
| Party | Candidate | Votes | % | ±% |
|---|---|---|---|---|
| Reform | Helen Kelly | 1,418 | 31.7 | +25.2 |
| Labour | James Chesson | 1,248 | 27.9 | –18.5 |
| Green | Ellie Crockett | 729 | 16.3 | +9.7 |
| Conservative | Richard Evans | 678 | 15.2 | –18.7 |
| Liberal Democrats | Richard Bray | 399 | 8.9 | +3.2 |
| Majority | | 170 | 3.8 | N/A |
| Turnout | | 4,472 | 46.9 | +9.4 |
| Registered electors | | ~9,541 | | |
| Reform gain from Labour | | Swing | ▲21.9 | |

=== Devonport ===
Devonport
| Party | Candidate | Votes | % | ±% |
|---|---|---|---|---|
| Reform | Paul Rielly | 1,509 | 40.2 | +27.5 |
| Labour | Bill Stevens* | 1,089 | 29.0 | –18.1 |
| Green | Simon Pannett | 602 | 16.0 | +9.5 |
| Conservative | Ian Fleming | 300 | 8.0 | –4.8 |
| Liberal Democrats | Alan Jagodzinski | 151 | 4.0 | –0.2 |
| Independent | David Rixon | 70 | 1.9 | N/A |
| TUSC | Lesley Duncan | 30 | 0.8 | –0.9 |
| Majority | | 420 | 11.2 | N/A |
| Turnout | | 3,751 | 32.4 | +6.1 |
| Registered electors | | ~11,577 | | |
| Reform gain from Labour | | Swing | ▲22.8 | |

=== Drake ===
Drake
| Party | Candidate | Votes | % | ±% |
|---|---|---|---|---|
| Green | Saahi Aroori | 1,019 | 38.5 | ▲30.9 |
| Labour | Chelsea Shelton | 798 | 30.1 | ▼7.7 |
| Reform | Mark Ingrouille | 485 | 18.3 | N/A |
| Independent | Chaz Singh | 183 | 6.9 | N/A |
| Conservative | Tim Blazevic | 89 | 3.4 | ▲1.3 |
| Liberal Democrats | Mark Ingall | 63 | 2.4 | ▲0.9 |
| TUSC | Edward Evans | 12 | 0.5 | ▼1.1 |
| Majority | | 221 | 8.4 | N/A |
| Turnout | | 2,649 | 37.5 | ▲4.8 |
| Registered electors | | ~7,070 | | |
| Green gain from Labour | | Swing | ▲19.3 | |

=== Efford and Lipson ===
Efford and Lipson
| Party | Candidate | Votes | % | ±% |
|---|---|---|---|---|
| Reform | Chris Sharpe | 1,543 | 40.2 | +27.1 |
| Labour | Neil Hendy* | 1,057 | 27.6 | –30.1 |
| Green | Pat Bushell | 726 | 18.9 | +9.4 |
| Conservative | Edmund Shillabeer | 293 | 7.6 | –6.2 |
| Liberal Democrats | Alex Primmer | 189 | 4.9 | –0.2 |
| TUSC | Nik Brookson | 27 | 0.7 | –0.2 |
| Majority | | 486 | 12.6 | N/A |
| Turnout | | 3,835 | 37.5 | +8.2 |
| Registered electors | | ~10,224 | | |
| Reform gain from Labour | | Swing | ▲28.6 | |

=== Eggbuckland ===
Eggbuckland
| Party | Candidate | Votes | % | ±% |
|---|---|---|---|---|
| Reform | Paul Hagan | 1,723 | 41.5 | N/A |
| Conservative | Chip Tofan* | 948 | 22.8 | –20.5 |
| Labour | Seb Soper | 648 | 15.6 | –27.2 |
| Green | Lorna Gaskin | 382 | 9.2 | +3.6 |
| Liberal Democrats | Dennis Draper | 303 | 7.3 | +0.5 |
| Independent | Kevin Neil | 151 | 3.6 | N/A |
| Majority | | 775 | 18.7 | N/A |
| Turnout | | 4,155 | 40.8 | +7.8 |
| Registered electors | | ~10,174 | | |
| Reform gain from Conservative | | | | |

=== Ham ===
Ham
| Party | Candidate | Votes | % | ±% |
|---|---|---|---|---|
| Reform | Ben Rowe | 1,649 | 44.4 | +33.9 |
| Labour | Tina Tuohy* | 785 | 21.1 | –27.5 |
| Green | Josh Ayres | 427 | 11.5 | +7.0 |
| Conservative | Charlotte Carlyle | 378 | 10.2 | –4.0 |
| Independent | Stephen Hulme | 295 | 7.9 | –8.8 |
| Liberal Democrats | Tim Parkin | 169 | 4.5 | –0.1 |
| TUSC | Kara Odinsdottir | 15 | 0.4 | –0.5 |
| Majority | | 864 | 23.3 | N/A |
| Turnout | | 3,718 | 33.9 | +4.4 |
| Registered electors | | ~10,981 | | |
| Reform gain from Labour | | Swing | ▲30.7 | |

=== Honicknowle ===
Honicknowle
| Party | Candidate | Votes | % | ±% |
|---|---|---|---|---|
| Reform | Shaun Hooper | 1,868 | 52.9 | +33.0 |
| Labour | Tina Scott | 835 | 23.6 | –31.6 |
| Green | Frank Hartkopf | 348 | 9.8 | +3.9 |
| Conservative | Margaret Boadella | 307 | 8.7 | –8.4 |
| Liberal Democrats | Magda Janczak-Hogarth | 175 | 5.0 | N/A |
| Majority | | 1,033 | 29.3 | N/A |
| Turnout | | 3,533 | 33.2 | +6.1 |
| Registered electors | | ~10,638 | | |
| Reform gain from Independent | | Swing | ▲32.3 | |

=== Moor View ===
Moor View
| Party | Candidate | Votes | % | ±% |
|---|---|---|---|---|
| Reform | Andrew Crumplin | 2,076 | 50.6 | +36.9 |
| Labour | Nicky Williams | 713 | 17.4 | –30.7 |
| Conservative | Caroline Mills | 688 | 16.8 | –10.8 |
| Green | Aiden Nicholls | 376 | 9.2 | +5.4 |
| Liberal Democrats | Jacqui Spencer | 233 | 5.7 | +1.7 |
| TUSC | Andy White | 16 | 0.4 | –0.2 |
| Majority | | 1,363 | 33.2 | N/A |
| Turnout | | 4,102 | 40.4 | +5.6 |
| Registered electors | | ~10,161 | | |
| Reform gain from Independent | | Swing | ▲33.8 | |

=== Peverell ===
Peverell
| Party | Candidate | Votes | % | ±% |
|---|---|---|---|---|
| Labour | Jeremy Goslin* | 1,911 | 37.2 | –14.1 |
| Reform | Luke Hudson | 1,442 | 28.1 | +23.0 |
| Green | Nicholas Casley | 828 | 16.1 | +7.6 |
| Conservative | Colin Wells | 732 | 14.2 | –16.1 |
| Liberal Democrats | Stuart Bonar | 206 | 4.0 | +0.3 |
| TUSC | Alison Stallard | 20 | 0.4 | –0.7 |
| Majority | | 469 | 9.1 | –11.9 |
| Turnout | | 5,139 | 49.1 | +4.5 |
| Registered electors | | ~10,471 | | |
| Labour hold | | Swing | ▼18.6 | |

=== Plympton Chaddlewood ===
Plympton Chaddlewood
| Party | Candidate | Votes | % | ±% |
|---|---|---|---|---|
| Reform | Angie Smith | 1,013 | 40.6 | +29.7 |
| Green | Zoe Reilly* | 877 | 35.1 | –18.1 |
| Conservative | Ben Manning | 309 | 12.4 | –9.5 |
| Independent | Nicky Trevaskis | 137 | 5.5 | N/A |
| Labour | Chris Mavin | 106 | 4.2 | –6.8 |
| Liberal Democrats | Ben Ferrier | 55 | 2.2 | –0.1 |
| Majority | | 137 | 5.5 | N/A |
| Turnout | | 2,497 | 39.7 | +4.0 |
| Registered electors | | ~6,285 | | |
| Reform gain from Green | | Swing | ▲23.9 | |

=== Plympton St Mary ===
Plympton St Mary
| Party | Candidate | Votes | % | ±% |
|---|---|---|---|---|
| Reform | Vanessa Tyler | 1,448 | 32.8 | +22.6 |
| Conservative | Natalie Harrison | 1,383 | 31.3 | +3.9 |
| Independent | Maddi Bridgeman* | 620 | 14.0 | –21.2 |
| Green | Robin Furner | 422 | 9.6 | +4.9 |
| Labour | Julia Wildman | 340 | 7.7 | –11.2 |
| Liberal Democrats | Ioana-Cristina Draper | 205 | 4.6 | +1.7 |
| Majority | | 65 | 1.5 | N/A |
| Turnout | | 4,418 | 43.6 | +9.8 |
| Registered electors | | ~10,138 | | |
| Reform gain from Conservative | | Swing | ▲9.4 | |

=== Plymstock Dunstone ===
Plymstock Dunstone
| Party | Candidate | Votes | % | ±% |
|---|---|---|---|---|
| Reform | Grace Stickland | 1,791 | 36.9 | +28.8 |
| Conservative | Andy Lugger | 1,232 | 25.4 | –5.9 |
| Labour | Alistair Philpot | 870 | 17.9 | –18.1 |
| Liberal Democrats | Steve Guy | 565 | 11.6 | –5.9 |
| Green | Sara O’Hanlon | 401 | 8.3 | +5.3 |
| Majority | | 559 | 11.5 | N/A |
| Turnout | | 4,859 | 47.1 | +8.5 |
| Registered electors | | ~10,321 | | |
| Reform gain from Labour | | Swing | ▲17.4 | |

=== Plymstock Radford ===
Plymstock Radford
| Party | Candidate | Votes | % | ±% |
|---|---|---|---|---|
| Conservative | John Mahony | 1,799 | 34.6 | +4.8 |
| Reform | Peter Gold | 1,708 | 32.8 | +22.5 |
| Labour | Elena Agapescu | 767 | 14.7 | –20.9 |
| Green | Simon Adderley | 603 | 11.6 | +3.4 |
| Liberal Democrats | Roy Plumley | 326 | 6.3 | +2.2 |
| Majority | | 91 | 1.8 | N/A |
| Turnout | | 5,203 | 45.5 | +10.3 |
| Registered electors | | ~11,445 | | |
| Conservative hold | | Swing | ▼8.9 | |

=== Southway ===
Southway
| Party | Candidate | Votes | % | ±% |
|---|---|---|---|---|
| Reform | Jacqueline Sansom | 1,733 | 46.2 | +28.3 |
| Labour | Jean Hebson | 622 | 16.6 | –32.2 |
| Conservative | John McCurdy | 589 | 15.7 | –4.9 |
| Green | Dan Browning | 475 | 12.7 | +7.5 |
| Liberal Democrats | Simon Batchelor | 206 | 5.5 | –0.3 |
| Independent | Jon Dredge | 109 | 2.9 | N/A |
| TUSC | Anthony Bligh | 14 | 0.4 | –1.3 |
| Majority | | 1,111 | 29.6 | N/A |
| Turnout | | 3,748 | 36.7 | +5.7 |
| Registered electors | | ~10,224 | | |
| Reform gain from Conservative | | Swing | ▲30.3 | |

=== St Budeaux ===
St Budeaux
| Party | Candidate | Votes | % | ±% |
|---|---|---|---|---|
| Reform | Mark Hadfield | 1,627 | 49.9 | +41.0 |
| Green | Jon Anderson | 584 | 17.9 | –10.7 |
| Labour | Joanne Bowden | 538 | 16.5 | –22.2 |
| Conservative | Mark Deacon | 512 | 15.7 | –1.2 |
| Majority | | 1,043 | 32.0 | N/A |
| Turnout | | 3,261 | 33.4 | +5.2 |
| Registered electors | | ~9,752 | | |
| Reform gain from Labour | | Swing | ▲25.9 | |

=== St Peter and the Waterfront ===
St Peter and the Waterfront
| Party | Candidate | Votes | % | ±% |
|---|---|---|---|---|
| Reform | Andy Rose | 1,297 | 29.4 | +16.1 |
| Labour | Alison Raynsford* | 1,250 | 28.4 | –23.2 |
| Green | Rachel Ali | 1,072 | 24.3 | +14.3 |
| Conservative | Kevin Kelway | 426 | 9.7 | –6.5 |
| Liberal Democrats | Hugh Janes | 225 | 5.1 | –1.1 |
| Independent | Benjamin Barton | 85 | 1.9 | N/A |
| TUSC | Ryan Aldred | 51 | 1.2 | –1.6 |
| Majority | | 47 | 1.0 | N/A |
| Turnout | | 4,406 | 34.7 | +6.2 |
| Registered electors | | ~12,701 | | |
| Reform gain from Labour | | Swing | ▲19.7 | |

=== Stoke ===
Stoke
| Party | Candidate | Votes | % | ±% |
|---|---|---|---|---|
| Labour | Tom Briars-Delve* | 1,665 | 38.1 | –24.2 |
| Reform | Nigel Theyer | 1,294 | 29.6 | N/A |
| Green | Jess Duffy | 834 | 19.1 | +8.2 |
| Conservative | Ehren Duke | 320 | 7.3 | –12.0 |
| Liberal Democrats | Helen Guy | 174 | 4.0 | –0.5 |
| Independent | Jacqui Cant | 59 | 1.4 | N/A |
| TUSC | Alex Moore | 19 | 0.4 | –2.6 |
| Majority | | 371 | 8.5 | –34.5 |
| Turnout | | 4,365 | 42.3 | +8.9 |
| Registered electors | | ~10,319 | | |
| Labour hold | | | | |

=== Sutton and Mount Gould ===
Sutton and Mount Gould
| Party | Candidate | Votes | % | ±% |
|---|---|---|---|---|
| Green | Byran Driver | 1,725 | 40.5 | ▲29.1 |
| Reform | Lee Bunker | 1,163 | 27.3 | ▲18.9 |
| Labour | Mary Aspinall* | 942 | 22.1 | ▼34.3 |
| Conservative | Robert Zajko | 251 | 5.9 | ▼9.0 |
| Liberal Democrats | Fleur Ball | 157 | 3.7 | ▼2.8 |
| TUSC | Alexandra Sampson | 25 | 0.6 | ▼1.7 |
| Majority | | 562 | 13.2 | N/A |
| Turnout | | 4,263 | 41.2 | ▲10.3 |
| Registered electors | | ~10,279 | | |
| Green gain from Labour | | Swing | ▲5.1 | |
