= Plymouth Civic Centre =

Municipal building in Plymouth, Devon, England

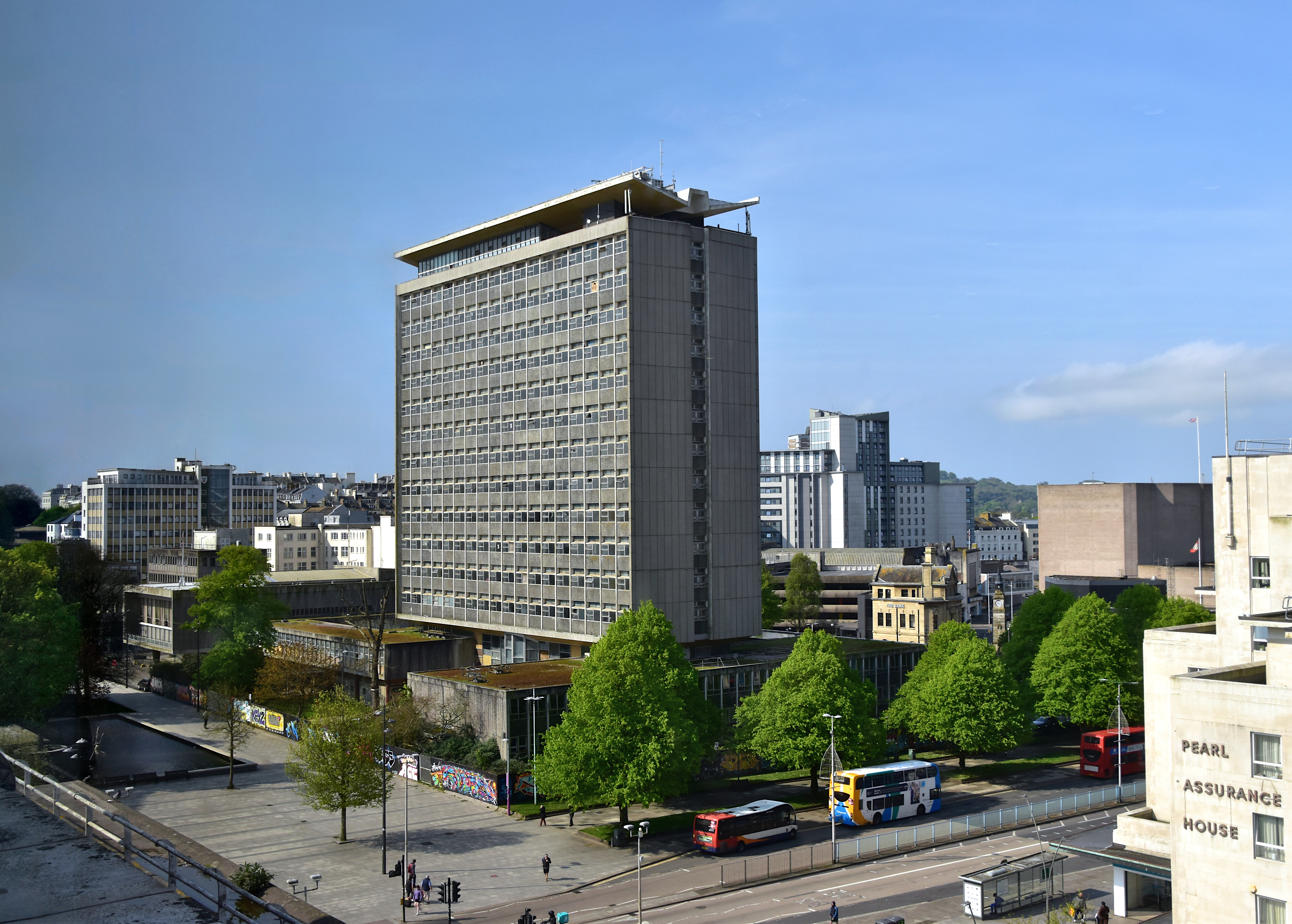

General information
- Classification

Listed Building – Grade II
- Official name: Council House and former Civic Centre
- Designated: 21 June 2007
- Reference no.: 1392038
- Location: Plymouth, England, Armada Way, Plymouth PL1 2AA
- Coordinates: 50.369762°N 4.143204°W
- Inaugurated: 1962

Plymouth Civic Centre is the former headquarters of Plymouth City Council on Armada Way in Plymouth, Devon, England. The building is in two sections, comprising a 14-storey tower block which housed the council's offices, and a two-storey southern wing called the Council House which includes the council chamber and is linked to the tower block by a bridge at first floor level. The building was completed in 1962. The council sold the tower block part of the building in 2015, but the Council House remains the council's meeting place. The whole complex has been a Grade II listed building since 2007.

== History ==
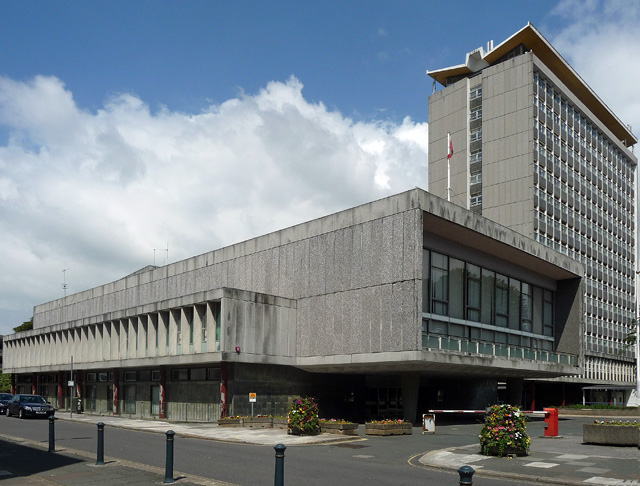
The southern wing, Council House, with the Civic Centre behind, in 2014.

Plymouth City Council's previous permanent headquarters had been the Municipal Offices, built in 1874 on the north side of Guildhall Square, opposite the Guildhall, which was built at the same time. The Municipal Offices were destroyed in March 1941 during the Plymouth Blitz. For the next 21 years the council's departments were scattered across the city in temporary premises.

As part of the post-war plans to rebuild the city, the Civic Centre was designed by city architect Hector Stirling and the design was approved in 1957. The architects Jellicoe, Ballantyne & Colleridge were subsequently given authority to make amendments to his design, although Stirling's general layout and concept remained.

Excavation work was commenced by Messrs Richard Costain in January 1958, and Messrs Staverton Builders Ltd began the foundation and substructure work in August 1958. The construction of the adjoining Council House was initiated by Messrs Humphreys Ltd in November 1959. After budget overruns, there were concerns over whether the tower building would ever be finished, but the Civic Centre was eventually completed at a cost of £1,600,000. It was handed over to the council on 21 March 1962 and Queen Elizabeth II officially opened the building on 26 July 1962.

By the 21st century, Plymouth City Council felt the building was uneconomic to maintain and inadequate for their needs. Plans to demolish the building were scrapped when the centre became a Grade II listed building in June 2007. The council then began looking at possible future uses for the building.

In 2013, plans for the tower to become a hotel were announced, with the Akkeron Group set to purchase the building. The purchase did not come to fruition and the tower was sold to developers Urban Splash instead for £1. The council began to vacate the building in 2014 and the last of the staff left in 2015. The council has retained the adjacent Council House, while the tower awaits redevelopment. In January 2020, Urban Splash presented plans to convert the tower for residential use creating 144 apartments.

In March 2024, Plymouth City Council announced that they would buy the Civic Centre back from Urban Splash for £1 after securing £8.7 million in levelling-up funding to convert the lower floors of the building into a new campus for City College Plymouth's "Blue-Green Skills Hub". The scheme was announced on 11 March 2024, and approved on 18 March 2024 by the council.

== Design ==
The Civic Centre is a fourteen-storey tower block, with a 'butterfly' roof canopy and an attached two-storey block to the north. The tower housed the offices of the various municipal departments. The top storey of the tower was originally the Rooftop Restaurant, which was open to the public and closed in 1975. The adjoining two-storey building Council House has a number of committee rooms, a council chamber, reception room and the Lord Mayor's suite. The members' entrance to the Council House contains a mural depicting local scenes painted by Mary Adshead in 1962.
