= 2023 Plymouth City Council election =

2023 local election in Plymouth

- 4 May 2023

19 of the 57 seats to Plymouth City Council 29 seats needed for a majority

	First party	Second party	Third party
Leader	Tudor Evans	Nick Kelly (defeated)	Mark Shayer
Party	Labour	Independent Alliance	Conservative
Last election	24	0	24
Seats before	24	5	23
Seats won	15	2	1
Seats after	31	3	18
Seat change	▲7	▼2	▼5
Popular vote	27,615	5,770	15,242
Percentage	45.3%	9.5%	25.0%
	Fourth party	Fifth party
Leader	None	Ian Poyser
Party	Independent	Green
Last election	8	1
Seats before	1	3
Seats won	1	0
Seats after	2	2
Seat change	▲1	▼1
Popular vote	1,877	5,195
Percentage	3.1%	8.5%
- Map showing the results of contested wards in the 2023 Plymouth City Council elections.
Leader before election
Mark Shayer
(Acting leader)
Conservative
No overall control
Leader after election
Tudor Evans
Labour

The 2023 Plymouth City Council election was held on 4 May 2023 to elect members of Plymouth City Council in England. It coincided with local elections across the United Kingdom.

In the previous election in 2022, both Labour and the Conservative Party gained seats, primarily due to councillors who had left their party groups standing down or unsuccessfully seeking re-election. The Green Party won its first ever seat on Plymouth Council in that election. After being deselected by the Conservative Party, the former council leader Nick Kelly started a new "Independent Alliance" group with the ex-Conservative councillor Terri Beer and the ex-Labour councillor Chaz Singh. The Independent Alliance group grew with more defections from the Conservative group. After two Conservative councillors who had moved to Gloucestershire resigned, by-elections took place in Moor View and Plympton Chaddlewood, which were won by Labour and the Green Party respectively. The Conservative council leader Richard Bingley, who had been elected to replace Kelly in March 2022, resigned in March 2023 after controversially ordering the felling of trees on Armada Way. His deputy, Mark Shayer, took over as leader of the Conservative group and interim council leader.

The election was won by the Labour Party, who gained seven seats to hold an overall majority for the first time since the 2021 election. The Conservatives only won a single seat, with ex-Conservative councillors winning as independent candidates in Plympton, where they were aligned with the Independent Alliance, and in Drake, where Steve Ricketts returned to the council after losing his seat as a Conservative in 2018.

== Background ==
=== History ===
Result of the council election when these seats were last contested in 2019

Result of the most recent council election in 2022

Plymouth City Council held local elections, along with councils across England as part of the 2023 local elections. The council elects its councillors in thirds, with a third of seats being up for election every year for three years, with no election each fourth year to correspond with councillors' four-year terms. Councillors defending their seats in this election were previously elected in 2019. In that election, ten Labour candidates and nine Conservative candidates were elected.

Elections in Plymouth are usually competitive between the Labour Party and the Conservative Party. The council was controlled by the Labour Party from the 2018 council election until the 2021 council election, when the council entered no overall control, with no party holding a majority of seats. One Labour councillor elected in 2018—Kevin Neil—was suspended from his party in the same year. Another councillor, Chaz Singh, left the Labour Party in 2019. Several Conservative councillors left their group to sit as independents, including the former council leader Ian Bowyer, after two of them were suspended by the group leader Nick Kelly for publishing a press release supporting a reduction in the speed limit on the A38 road through the city. Kelly was later suspended from his party after making comments about a local murder that were characterised as victim-blaming. He was later reinstated. Around the same time, other Conservative councillors left the group or were suspended. After Kelly was unable to pass a budget in February 2022, Labour called a vote of no confidence in him. Kelly lost, and the council selected a new leader: the Conservative councillor Richard Bingley, who had previously been a member of the Labour Party and the UK Independence Party. Terri Beer resigned from the Conservative group to sit as an independent councillor in response to Bingley's election.

The council remained under no overall control after the 2022 council election. Neil and several of the former Conservative councillors who had left their group didn't seek re-election; the former Conservative councillor Dave Downie unsuccessfully sought re-election as an independent candidate. The Green Party won their first ever seat on the council in Plympton Chaddlewood. Labour won Compton ward for the first time, with the winning candidate, Dylan Tippetts, becoming Plymouth's first trans councillor. The overall result saw the council remain under no overall control, with Labour and the Conservatives each on 24 seats. The independent councillor George Wheeler, who had originally been elected as a Labour candidate, joined the Green Party shortly after the election. Five independent councillors who had been suspended from or left the Conservative group rejoined it on 17 May, giving the Conservatives an overall majority on the council.

=== Developments since 2022 ===
==== Defections and suspensions ====
In October 2022, Kelly was again suspended from the Conservative group after "complaints and allegations" were made against him. He resigned from the group on 15 October, complaining that he had been deselected and accusing Bingley of a "vile, defamatory, and inaccurate outburst against me and fellow councillors". His resignation meant that the council returned to no overall control only five months after the Conservatives had held a majority of seats on the council. Later that month, Kelly formed an independent group on the council called the Independent Alliance with the former Conservative councillor Terri Beer and the former Labour councillor Chaz Singh. The Conservative councillor Maddi Bridgeman, who had recently had complaints upheld against Bingley in an independent investigation, was suspended from the Conservative group in the same month. In December, the councillor Stephen Hulme left the Conservative group to sit as an independent councillor, saying "I don't think the council listens to the people of Plymouth". He joined Kelly's Independent Alliance group later that month. In January 2023, another Conservative councillor and former council leader, Patrick Nicholson, left his party to join the Independent Alliance in protest against the proposed council budget and not being reselected as a candidate for the 2023 elections. Bridgman left the Conservative Party in January, saying that her local party had "harassed, bullied, and publicly humiliated" her because she was a woman. A report into her from the Conservative association said that her claims of sexism "amount to unbefitting conduct".

==== January 2023 by-elections ====
Two Conservative councillors, Dan Collins and Shannon Burden, moved from Plymouth to Gloucestershire in May 2022. Labour councillors called on them to resign while Bingley said he was "confident that they are doing their job as councillors" and that he was "comfortable with the situation". In November 2022, the council passed a motion proposed by Beer calling on them to resign immediately. They resigned, saying that they had previously planned to stay until the 2023 elections. By-elections took place on 12 January 2023. Independent by-election candidates Gavin Marshall and Andrew Hill said they would join the Independent Alliance group if they were successful. The Moor View by-election was won by the Labour candidate, Will Noble, a cleaner at Derriford Hospital. The Plympton Chaddlewood by-election was won by the Green candidate, Lauren McLay, a communications specialist. Bingley blamed his party's losses on national politics, and declined to resign. The BBC journalist Ewan Murrie wrote that the Labour group would be "unlikely to call a no confidence vote before the May elections".

Moor View by-election
Party	Candidate	Votes	%	±%
Labour	Will Noble	1,415	53.2	▲23.8
Conservative	Andrea Johnson	877	33.0	▼30.5
Independent	Gavin Marshall	184	6.9	N/A
Green	Frank Hartkopf	87	3.3	▼1.0
Liberal Democrats	Colin MacKenzie	77	2.9	▲0.6
TUSC	Andrew White	18	0.7	N/A
Turnout		2,658	26.0	▼12.5
Labour gain from Conservative		Swing	27.2	

Plympton Chaddlewood by-election
Party	Candidate	Votes	%	±%
Green	Lauren McLay	653	44.9	▲1.7
Conservative	Ashley Ward	425	29.2	▼18.4
Independent	Andrew Hill	182	12.5	N/A
Labour	Lindsay Gilmour	147	10.1	▲0.9
Liberal Democrats	Mike Gillbard	33	2.3	N/A
TUSC	Benjamin Davy	15	1.0	N/A
Turnout		1,455	23.8	▼13.4
Green gain from Conservative		Swing	10.0	

==== Armada Way tree felling ====
Since 2017, the council had been preparing for regeneration work along Armada Way, a major commercial street in the city centre. The plans would create public meeting places, areas of wildflowers, a cycle lane and new seating. They also required cutting down mature trees along the road, with more being planted than would be initially removed. After opposition to the tree felling from the group Save the Trees of Armada Way (Straw), the council announced an additional one-week consultation. A majority of responses to the consultation opposed the plan, but the council said that most opposition did not include a reason and that the numbers were increased by activism from Straw. The council leader Richard Bingley said that the public supported the scheme, saying it would make the road safer and provide better drainage.

During the night of 14 March, contractors cut down 110 mature trees after Bingley signed an executive order to approve the work. Sixteen more had been planned to be cut down, but the work had to be stopped after a judge "granted an injunction against the tree felling" requested by Straw. One of Straw's lawyers said that the group wanted to preserve the stumps of felled trees as "we view them as living trees still". The council said it would dispute the injunction. The injunction was upheld pending judicial review of the decision-making process, preventing the council from cutting down any remaining trees but allowing the council to remove the trees that had been felled "under expert advice and with Straw involved". Bingley said that there should be a public inquiry into the regeneration scheme, suggesting that Labour and Green Party politicians should share responsibility for decisions about it. He accused Labour and the Green Party of "political extremism" for their opposition to the felling.

On 22 March, the Independent Alliance and Green Party group both called for Bingley to resign, with the latter proposing a vote of no confidence. Later that day, he announced that he would resign as leader of the Conservative group on the following Monday. The two Conservative MPs whose constituencies include parts of Plymouth City Council, Johnny Mercer and Gary Streeter, said that Evans should take over the council until the local elections in May. Evans said that his party should not take control of the council without a mandate from the May election. The deputy leader of the Conservative group, Mark Shayer, took over as leader of the Conservative group and interim leader of the council until the election. At the same meeting, the council unanimously voted to establish an independent review of the regeneration project.

Nick Kelly collapsed at a public event in his ward on 25 March. The former Labour councillor Chaz Singh took on the role of acting leader of the Independent Alliance group while Kelly recovered. The Labour councillor Brian Vincent died in April. Vincent had first been elected in 1997 and had served a continuous term since 2003.

== Campaign ==
Statements of persons nominated were published on 5 April listing all validly nominated candidates. To hold a majority of seats after the election, the Conservatives needed to win thirteen out of the nineteen seats up for election, while Labour needed to win twelve. Labour activists said they were confident they would be able to win at least twelve seats.

Mark Shayer, who took over as acting leader of the council after Bingley resigned, said he would not seek re-election as Conservative group leader after the council election.

The Labour group leader Tudor Evans said that the Conservative administration felling trees in the city centre was not one of the issues raised most often by voters, who were instead focused on the cost of living, particularly food and energy prices. He said that a Labour council would increase the number of trees, wildflowers and greenery in the city centre alongside "economic diversification". The Conservative candidate and former councillor Andrea Johnson said that most voters who bring up the cost of living were grateful for government support rather than critical. All parties except the Conservatives said they would protect the remaining healthy trees on Armada Way. The Conservatives "said they did not have a policy".

The Conservatives campaigned on their support for freeport status, saying that it would increase local earnings. Labour promised to take action against antisocial behaviour, build new affordable homes including homes for social rent, and work to reduce waiting times for local NHS services. The Independent Alliance promised to protect trees in the city centre and reduce management costs at the city council. The Green Party, who do not whip their councillors to a single position, said they would prioritise environmental issues and ensure that residents are more thoroughly consulted to prevent issues like the Armada Way tree felling controversy.

A multilevel regression with poststratification model by the polling firm YouGov suggested that Labour were likely to get 42% of the vote, with the Conservatives on 32%, the Liberal Democrats and Greens on 7% each, and independents and minor parties on 11% together. They described the probable council control as "leaning Labour" reflecting "modest Labour gains". The Times predicted further losses for the Conservatives, highlighting Labour's need to make gains in the city in the 2024 United Kingdom general election to be able to form a government.

== Council composition ==
Council composition following the 2022 council election

Council composition ahead of the 2023 council election

Council composition after the 2023 council election

After 2022 election		Before 2023 election		After 2023 election	
Party	Seats	Party	Seats	Party	Seats
Labour	24	Labour	24	Labour	31
Conservative	24	Conservative	23	Conservative	18
Independent	8	Independent Alliance	5	Independent Alliance	3
Green	1	Green	3	Green	2
		Independent	1	Independent	2
		Vacant	1	Vacant	1

== Results ==
=== Overall ===
Labour gained seven seats, taking majority control of the council. The leader of the Independent Alliance group, Nick Kelly, lost his seat.

2023 Plymouth City Council election
Party	This election				Full council			This election		
Party	Candidates	Seats	Net	Seats %	Other	Total	Total %	Votes	Votes %	+/−
Labour	{{{candidates}}}	15	▲7	78.9	16	31	54.3	27,615	45.3	▲7.9
Ind. Alliance	{{{candidates}}}	2	▼2	10.5	1	3	5.3	5,770	9.5	N/A
Conservative	{{{candidates}}}	1	▼5	5.3	17	18	31.6	15,242	25.0	▼11.9
Independent	{{{candidates}}}	1	▲1	5.3	1	2	3.5	1,877	3.1	▲1.3
Green	{{{candidates}}}	0	▼1	0.0	2	2	3.5	5,195	8.5	▲4.6
Liberal Democrats	{{{candidates}}}	0	Steady	0.0	0	0	0.0	3,349	5.5	▼1.5
TUSC	{{{candidates}}}	0	Steady	0.0	0	0	0.0	882	1.4	N/A
Change for Plymouth	{{{candidates}}}	0	Steady	0.0	0	0	0.0	584	0.9	N/A
Reform	{{{candidates}}}	0	Steady	0.0	0	0	0.0	269	0.4	N/A
Heritage	{{{candidates}}}	0	Steady	0.0	0	0	0.0	139	0.2	N/A

Results for individual wards are listed below. Incumbent councillors are marked with an asterisk (*), except councillors running in a new ward who are marked with a dagger (†). Candidates for the Independent Alliance are listed on ballots as independent candidates but are marked here as "Ind. Alliance".

=== Budshead ===
Budshead
Party	Candidate	Votes	%	±%
Labour	Kevin Sproston	1,328	44.6	▲11.7
Conservative	Jonathan Drean*	1,177	39.5	▼7.5
Liberal Democrats	Jacqui Spencer	234	7.9	N/A
Green	Caroline Bennett	183	6.1	N/A
TUSC	Nik Brookson	54	1.8	N/A
Turnout		2,976		
Labour gain from Conservative		Swing	▲9.6	

=== Compton ===
Compton
Party	Candidate	Votes	%	±%
Labour	Angela Penrose	1,627	43.1	▲6.4
Conservative	Chris Wood	1,207	32.0	▼8.7
Ind. Alliance	Nick Kelly* (Note: Originally elected as a Conservative)	445	11.8	N/A
Green	Ewan Melling Flavell	269	7.1	N/A
Liberal Democrats	Richard Bray	185	4.9	▼5.2
TUSC	Samuel Hey	44	1.2	N/A
Turnout		3,777		
Labour gain from Conservative		Swing	▲7.5	

=== Devonport ===
Devonport
Party	Candidate	Votes	%	±%
Labour	Mark Coker*	1,693	62.1	▲15.8
Conservative	Jon Gatward	544	19.9	▼0.4
Green	James Ellwood	224	8.2	▲0.5
Liberal Democrats	Jim Spencer	187	6.9	▲1.5
TUSC	Lesley Duncan	80	2.9	N/A
Turnout		2,728		
Labour hold		Swing	▲8.1	

=== Drake ===
Drake
Party	Candidate	Votes	%	±%
Independent	Steve Ricketts	1,024	48.8	▲4.8
Labour Co-op	Paul McNamara	794	37.8	▼6.9
Green	Byran Driver	159	7.6	N/A
Conservative	Andy Evans	45	2.1	▼3.2
TUSC	Christopher Bligh	33	1.6	N/A
Liberal Democrats	Jeffrey Hall	31	1.5	▼3.2
Independent	Joe Vosper	14	0.7	N/A
Turnout		2,100		
Independent gain from Labour		Swing	▲5.8	

=== Efford and Lipson ===
Efford and Lipson
Party	Candidate	Votes	%	±%
Labour	Pauline Murphy*	1,701	58.9	▲4.5
Conservative	Will Jones	623	21.6	▲3.1
Green	Pat Bushell	338	11.7	N/A
Liberal Democrats	Alexander Primmer	155	5.4	▲2.3
TUSC	Matthew Whitear	69	2.4	N/A
Turnout		2,886		
Labour hold		Swing	▲0.7	

=== Eggbuckland ===
Eggbuckland
Party	Candidate	Votes	%	±%
Labour Co-op	Tess Blight	1,520	44.9	▲22.4
Conservative	Nigel Churchill†	1,125	33.2	▼19.6
Liberal Democrats	Dennis Draper	383	11.3	▲5.0
Green	Clint Jones	208	6.1	N/A
Heritage	Wayne Crow	120	3.5	N/A
TUSC	Neil Prentice	29	0.9	N/A
Turnout		3,385		
Labour gain from Conservative		Swing	▲21.0	

=== Ham ===
Ham
Party	Candidate	Votes	%	±%
Labour Co-op	Tudor Evans*	1,390	47.3	▲1.4
Conservative	Charlie Carson	569	19.4	▲0.1
Ind. Alliance	Chaz Singh† (Note: Originally elected as Labour)	509	17.3	N/A
Green	Leesa Alderton	167	5.7	N/A
Liberal Democrats	Stuart Bonar	164	5.6	▲0.6
Independent	Alison Casey	59	2.0	N/A
Independent	Andy Kerswell	58	2.0	N/A
TUSC	Katie Holden	20	0.7	N/A
Turnout		2,936		
Labour hold		Swing	▲0.6	

=== Honicknowle ===
Honicknowle
Party	Candidate	Votes	%	±%
Labour	Keith Moore	1,426	58.6	▲9.8
Conservative	Margaret Boadella	554	22.8	▲1.9
Green	Mickey Jakes	222	9.1	N/A
Liberal Democrats	Richard Simpson	179	7.4	▲3.5
TUSC	Louise Alldridge	54	2.2	N/A
Turnout		2,435		
Labour hold		Swing	▲3.9	

=== Moor View ===
Moor View
Party	Candidate	Votes	%	±%
Labour	Lindsay Gilmour	1,545	45.9	▲11.2
Conservative	Andrea Johnson	1,138	33.8	▼3.1
Ind. Alliance	Danny Bamping	254	7.5	N/A
Green	Frank Hartkopf	151	4.5	N/A
Liberal Democrats	Colin MacKenzie	149	4.4	▼0.3
Independent	Arthur Watson	109	3.2	▼1.6
TUSC	Andrew White	22	0.7	N/A
Turnout		3,368		
Labour gain from Conservative		Swing	▲7.1	

=== Peverell ===
Peverell
Party	Candidate	Votes	%	±%
Labour Co-op	Sarah Allen*	2,203	52.5	▲11.2
Conservative	Tim Lever	1,029	24.5	▼12.6
Ind. Alliance	Dave Cann	374	8.9	N/A
Green	Nicholas Casley	371	8.8	▲1.1
Liberal Democrats	William Preen	169	4.0	▼1.1
TUSC	Duncan Moore	48	1.1	N/A
Turnout		4,194		
Labour hold		Swing	11.9	

=== Plympton Erle ===
Plympton Erle
Party	Candidate	Votes	%	±%
Ind. Alliance	Terri Beer*	1,236	51.1	N/A
Labour	Roger Williams	498	20.6	▼2.6
Conservative	Ashley Ward	442	18.3	▼44.4
Green	Lucy Mackay	147	6.1	N/A
Liberal Democrats	Ioana-Cristina Draper	71	2.9	▼11.2
TUSC	Helen Yeo	25	1.0	N/A
Turnout		2,419		

=== Plympton St Mary ===
Plympton St Mary
Party	Candidate	Votes	%	±%
Ind. Alliance	Patrick Nicholson*	1,965	50.7	N/A
Conservative	Matthew Booté	827	21.3	▼51.3
Labour	Pete Smith	649	16.7	▼0.5
Green	Richard Worrall	266	6.9	N/A
Liberal Democrats	Sara Jennett	139	3.6	▼6.7
TUSC	Alan Frost	29	0.7	N/A
Turnout		3,875		

=== Plymstock Dunstone ===
Plymstock Dunstone
Party	Candidate	Votes	%	±%
Labour	John Stephens	2,210	50.7	▲27.2
Conservative	Julie Hunt	1,315	30.1	▼27.5
Ind. Alliance	Grace Stickland	309	7.1	N/A
Liberal Democrats	Peter Edwards	211	4.8	▼14.0
Green	Piers Driver	160	3.7	N/A
Reform	Peter Endean	117	2.7	N/A
TUSC	Jackie Hilton	21	0.5	N/A
Heritage	Darryl Ingram	19	0.4	N/A
Turnout		4,362		
Labour gain from Conservative		Swing	▲27.3	

=== Plymstock Radford ===
Plymstock Radford
Party	Candidate	Votes	%	±%
Conservative	Kathy Watkin*	1,381	35.5	▼14.5
Labour	Roger Dodd	1,150	29.6	▲6.7
Independent	John Wheeler	486	12.5	N/A
Green	James Dyson	379	9.7	▼6.2
Ind. Alliance	Neal Stoneman	247	6.3	N/A
Liberal Democrats	Roy Plumley	234	6.0	▼5.2
TUSC	Martin Wright	13	0.3	N/A
Turnout		3,890		
Conservative hold		Swing	▼10.6	

=== Southway ===
Southway
Party	Candidate	Votes	%	±%
Labour Co-op	Mark Lowry	1,361	45.0	▲7.4
Conservative	Mark Deacon*	884	29.2	▼11.5
Change for Plymouth	Emily Quick	427	14.1	N/A
Green	Clara Southby	171	5.7	N/A
Liberal Democrats	Katie McManus	142	4.7	▼1.0
TUSC	Anthony Bligh	40	1.3	N/A
Turnout		3,025		
Labour gain from Conservative		Swing	▲9.4	

=== St Budeaux ===
St Budeaux
Party	Candidate	Votes	%	±%
Labour	Jon Dingle	1,006	37.2	▼2.8
Green	George Wheeler*	714	26.4	N/A
Conservative	Kyle Lewis	614	22.7	▼10.7
Ind. Alliance	Gavin Marshall	147	5.4	N/A
Independent	Terry Deans	127	4.7	N/A
Liberal Democrats	Stephen Goldthorp	72	2.7	N/A
TUSC	Laurie Moore	21	0.8	N/A
Turnout		2,701		
Labour hold		Swing	N/A	

=== St Peter and the Waterfront ===
St Peter and the Waterfront
Party	Candidate	Votes	%	±%
Labour Co-op	Chris Penberthy*	1,689	48.0	▲4.5
Conservative	Ian Fleming	641	18.2	▼1.6
Green	Shayna Newham-Joynes	373	10.6	▲0.5
Liberal Democrats	Hugh Janes	244	6.9	▲0.7
Ind. Alliance	Darren Denslow	160	4.5	N/A
Change for Plymouth	Dean Bowles	157	4.5	N/A
Reform	Andy Gibbons	152	4.3	N/A
TUSC	Ryan Aldred	104	3.0	N/A
Turnout		3,520		
Labour hold		Swing	▲3.0	

=== Stoke ===
Stoke
Party	Candidate	Votes	%	±%
Labour Co-op	Jemima Laing*	2,041	61.8	▲14.7
Conservative	Ehren Duke	615	18.6	▼7.8
Green	Nicholas Ireland	330	10.0	▼3.2
Liberal Democrats	Mike Gillbard	224	6.8	▼0.1
TUSC	Alex Moore	92	2.8	N/A
Turnout		3,302		
Labour hold		Swing	▲11.2	

=== Sutton and Mount Gould ===
Sutton and Mount Gould
Party	Candidate	Votes	%	±%
Labour	Sue Dann*	1,784	58.6	▲4.9
Conservative	Edmund Shillabeer	512	16.8	▼4.6
Green	Michael Kewish	363	11.9	▼2.1
Liberal Democrats	Fleur Ball	176	5.8	▼1.3
Ind. Alliance	Tinny Sivasothy	124	4.1	N/A
TUSC	Alexandra Sampson	84	2.8	N/A
Turnout		3,043		
Labour hold		Swing	▲4.7	

== Aftermath ==
Labour took majority control of the council with Tudor Evans due to become council leader for the fifth time after being re-elected leader of the Labour group. Evans said that he would prepare an action plan to support people struggling during the cost-of-living crisis and deliver on the promised priorities from his party's election campaign. The Plymouth Herald said that Labour were likely to hold majority control of the council until at least the 2026 election, as they only needed to win three seats in the 2024 election to hold a majority and no election was due in 2025 due to the council electing by thirds. A by-election in Efford and Lipson is due to be held on 12 June 2023 to fill the seat of Brian Vincent, a Labour councillor who died in April 2023.

The Conservative group elected Andy Lugger as leader, who had served as councillor for Southway since the 2022 council election. Lugger re-appointed Pat Patel as the Conservative chief whip and campaign lead, asserting that Patel would enable the Conservatives to win the Efford and Lipson by-election. The Conservative councillor Philip Partridge left the Conservative group to form the new "Free Independent" group with Steve Ricketts. The Labour candidate, Paul McNamara, won the Efford and Lipson by-election.

In June 2023, the Conservative councillor Vivien Pengelly died. She was first elected as a councillor in 1989 and had served continuously since 1997, including leading the council from 2007 to 2012. Later that month, the Labour councillor Sue McDonald announced her resignation for "family health reasons". She had served as a councillor since 2006. By-elections took place in July fill their seats of Plymstock Dunstone and St Peter and the Waterfront. Labour won both seats.

In December 2023, the councillor Andrea Loveridge resigned from the Conservative group to sit as an independent councillor saying she had "lost confidence" in her party.
