= 2022 Plymouth City Council election =

2022 local election in Plymouth

← 2021	5 May 2022	2023 →

19 of the 57 seats to Plymouth City Council 29 seats needed for a majority
	First party	Second party
Leader	Tudor Evans	Richard Bingley
Party	Labour	Conservative
Last election	24	26
Seats before	23	22
Seats won	11	7
Seats after	24	24
Seat change	▲1	▲2
Popular vote	26,557	23,055
Percentage	43.6%	37.8%
	Third party	Fourth party
Leader	Ian Poyser	None
Party	Green	Independent
Last election	0	7
Seats before	0	12
Seats won	1	0
Seats after	1	8
Seat change	▲1	▼4
Popular vote	4,393	3,310
Percentage	7.2%	5.4%
- Map showing the results of contested wards in the 2022 Plymouth City Council elections.
Council control before election
No overall control
Council control after election
No overall control

The 2022 Plymouth City Council election took place on 5 May 2022 to elect members of Plymouth City Council in England. It coincided with local elections across the United Kingdom. The Conservative Party made gains in the previous election in 2021, resulting in the council entering no overall control with no party holding a majority of seats. Immediately following the results of the 2022 election, the council remained in no overall control. Labour and the Conservatives gained seats from independent councillors who had left their parties and exchanged seats with each other. The election saw the elections of the city's first Green Party councillor, Ian Poyser, and first trans councillor, Dylan Tippetts of the Labour Party.

Shortly after the election, five councillors who had resigned from the Conservative group under the previous council leader Nick Kelly returned to their party, giving the Conservatives an overall majority. The independent councillor George Wheeler, who had originally been elected as a Labour councillor, joined the Green Party.

== Background ==
=== History ===
Result of the council election when these seats were last contested in 2018

Result of the most recent council election in 2021

Plymouth City Council held local elections as part of the 2022 local elections. The council elects its councillors in thirds, with a third of seats being up for election every year for three years, and no election each fourth year, to correspond with councillors' four-year terms. Councillors defending their seats in this election were previously elected in 2018. In that election, eleven Labour candidates and eight Conservative candidates were elected.

Elections in Plymouth are usually competitive between the Labour Party and the Conservative Party. The council was controlled by the Labour Party from the 2018 Plymouth City Council election until the 2021 Plymouth City Council election, when the council entered no overall control, with no party holding a majority of seats. One Labour councillor elected in 2018—Kevin Neil—was suspended from his party in the same year. Another Labour councillor, Chaz Singh, left his party in 2019. Several Conservative councillors left their group to sit as independents, including the former council leader Ian Bowyer, after two of them were suspended by the group leader Nick Kelly for publishing a press release supporting a reduction in the speed limit on the A38 road through the city.

=== Developments since 2021 ===
The Conservatives made gains in the 2021 Plymouth City Council election and Nick Kelly was voted in as council leader with a minority of seats. In October 2021, the Conservative councillor Shannon Burden left the Conservative group to sit as an independent. In November 2021, the Conservative councillor Nigel Churchill left his party to sit as an independent councillor after he said complaints about breaches of the code of conduct were not being properly investigated. In the same month, Kelly was suspended from the Conservative Party over an interview about the murder of Bobbi-Anne McLeod in which he had said "everybody has a responsibility not to try to put themselves in a compromising position", which was characterised as victim blaming by women politicians in the city. In January 2022, another Conservative councillor, Stephen Hulme, left the Conservative group to sit as an independent. Kelly's suspension was lifted in the same month. In February 2022, another Conservative councillor, David Downie, was suspended from the group, leading to the Conservatives and Labour each having the same number of seats on the council.

Kelly's budget failed to pass in February, with a Labour amendment passing instead that froze council tax. Labour called a vote of no confidence in Kelly. A Conservative councillor told the Plymouth Herald that some group members might abstain in the vote. Kelly lost the vote, with 29 councillors voting no confidence, 23 voting confidence and one abstaining. Independent councillors were split, with Singh supporting Kelly in the debate. Two Conservative candidates were nominated to replace him: Vivien Pengelly, a former council leader, and Richard Bingley. Bingley was elected council leader with 26 votes to Pengelly's 12, with the remaining councillors abstaining. Bingley had previously been in the Labour Party and the UK Independence Party.

Later in March, the lord mayor of Plymouth, the Conservative councillor Terri Beer, resigned from the Conservative group and the Conservative Party to sit as an independent councillor in response to Bingley's election, calling his new cabinet "lacking in experience and ability" and that her party locally had "been run into the ground by unelected chairpersons not from South West Devon". She accused the new leadership of bullying. Her resignation meant that the Labour group had more councillors than the Conservatives.

== Campaign ==
The Conservative councillor David Downie was blocked from seeking selection by his local party in early 2022. He was suspended from the Conservative Party after questioning the decision, and later resigned his party membership after Richard Bingley became council leader. He said that the new cabinet had too many new councillors and he was "very concerned for the city, for the lack of experience and knowledge". In March 2022, he announced that he would run in Budshead as an independent candidate.

Plymouth Labour published their manifesto on 30 March 2022. They pledged to cancel plans to remove bus shelters, invest money in roads and pavements, build more homes and buy empty properties.

In April, recordings were published of a conversation between Bingley and the independent candidate Danny Bamping that had taken place in February. Bingley was recorded saying the then council leader Nick Kelly was a "weak, two-faced git" who had "been caught crossing me big time", and predicting that he would shortly no longer be council leader. He compared the Conservative councillor Maddi Bridgman to Izzat Ibrahim al-Douri, who served as vice president to Saddam Hussein, and said that the independent councillor Chaz Singh, who had supported Kelly, "needs to quickly shift his alliance". Kelly said he was "disappointed, appalled, and shocked". Bridgeman said she was "devastated by the vitriolic attack", and called for Bingley to resign, as well as asking their Conservative Association to suspend his membership. Margaret Boadella, the Conservative Association chair, said that people upset at Bingley's remarks should "do what I did when Downie was ranting at me, shut up and grow up".

Plymouth Live reported that Bingley had appeared in a YouTube video in June 2020 in which he said people shouldn't "worry too much about climate change in itself", that people should cycle less, and that the COVID-19 pandemic was a "mildly severe flu pandemic". In response to the report, he said that he had taken action against climate change since becoming council leader, and that his comments about COVID had been made early in the pandemic. Six councillors who had left the Conservative group to sit as independents during Kelly's leadership defended Bingley, saying that he had been smeared by "a small collective of disgruntled councillors".

Statements of persons nominated were published on 6 April listing all validly nominated candidates. In order to control a majority of seats on the council, the Conservatives would need to win twelve of the nineteen seats up for election, and Labour would need to win sixteen.

== Council composition ==
Council composition following the 2021 council election

Council composition ahead of the 2022 council election

Council composition following the 2022 council election

After 2021 election		Before 2022 election		After 2022 election		After 17 May 2022	
Party	Seats	Party	Seats	Party	Seats	Party	Seats
Conservative	26	Conservative	22	Labour	24	Conservative	29
Labour	24	Labour	23	Conservative	24	Labour	24
Independent	7	Independent	12	Independent	8	Green	2
				Green	1	Independent	2

== Results ==
=== Overall ===
The results saw Labour and the Conservatives level on twenty-four seats each. Each party gained seats from independent councillors who were originally elected from their parties. Dave Downie, originally a Conservative, was the only independent councillor to contest his former seat, Budshead, where he was beaten by the Conservative candidate. The Conservatives gained Southway from Labour, while Labour gained Compton from the Conservatives for the first time ever. The Green Party won their first ever seat on the council, with their candidate Ian Poyser gaining Plympton Chaddlewood from the Conservatives. Dylan Tippetts, the new Labour councillor for Compton, became the first trans councillor for the city.

2022 Plymouth City Council election
Party	This election			Full council			This election		
Party	Seats	Net	Seats %	Other	Total	Total %	Votes	Votes %	+/−
Labour	11	▲1	57.9	13	24	42.1	26,557	43.6	▼0.4
Conservative	7	▲2	36.8	17	24	42.1	23,055	37.8	▼6.9
Green	1	▲1	5.3	0	1	1.8	4,393	7.2	▲5.4
Independent	0	▼4	0.0	8	8	14.0	3,310	5.4	▲3.8
Liberal Democrats	0	Steady	0.0	0	0	0.0	2,545	4.2	▼1.1
TUSC	0	Steady	0.0	0	0	0.0	626	1.0	▲0.5
Change for Plymouth	0	Steady	0.0	0	0	0.0	382	0.6	N/A
Heritage	0	Steady	0.0	0	0	0.0	92	0.2	N/A

All changes are relative to the previous time these seats were up in the 2018 election.

=== Budshead ===
Downie was previously elected as the Conservative candidate.

Budshead
Party	Candidate	Votes	%	±%
Conservative	Lee Finn	1,097	35.7	▼16.0
Independent	Dave Downie*	956	31.2	N/A
Labour Co-op	Isabel Saxby	866	28.2	▼10.8
Liberal Democrats	Colin Mackenzie	150	4.9	▲1.3
Turnout		3,069	31.2	▼3.4
Conservative hold		Swing	N/A	

=== Compton ===
Compton
Party	Candidate	Votes	%	±%
Labour Co-op	Dylan Tippetts	1,431	40.6	▲1.3
Conservative	Martin Leaves	1,327	37.7	▼12.7
Liberal Democrats	Richard Bray	308	8.7	▲3.4
Green	Ewan Melling Flavell	273	7.8	▲2.8
Independent	Danny Bamping	156	4.4	N/A
TUSC	Nigel Buckley	26	0.7	N/A
Turnout		3,521	37.5	▼3.8
Labour gain from Conservative		Swing	▲7.0	

=== Devonport ===
Devonport
Party	Candidate	Votes	%	±%
Labour	Bill Stevens*	1,633	55.2	▼2.0
Conservative	Kyle Lewis	828	28.0	▼0.2
Change for Plymouth	Karen Pilkington	193	6.5	N/A
Green	Andrew Pratt	152	5.1	▲2.1
Liberal Democrats	Jeffrey Hall	108	3.6	▲0.1
TUSC	Lesley Duncan	45	1.5	▲0.8
Turnout		2,959	26.3	▼3.7
Labour hold		Swing	▼0.9	

=== Drake ===
Drake
Party	Candidate	Votes	%	±%
Labour Co-op	Charlotte Holloway	955	48.4	▼3.4
Independent	Steve Ricketts	891	45.2	N/A
Conservative	Ross Farr-Semmens	67	3.4	▼39.4
Liberal Democrats	Fleur Ball	33	1.7	▼2.4
TUSC	Samuel Hey	26	1.3	N/A
Turnout		1,972	32.7	▲3.3
Labour hold		Swing	N/A	

=== Efford and Lipson ===
Efford and Lipson
Party	Candidate	Votes	%	±%
Labour	Neil Hendy*	1,770	60.6	▲0.6
Conservative	Gregg Black	740	25.3	▼5.5
Green	Pat Bushell	211	7.2	▲2.3
Liberal Democrats	Alex Primmer	135	4.6	▲1.6
TUSC	Matthew Whitear	65	2.2	▲1.0
Turnout		2,921	29.3	▲0.1
Labour hold		Swing	▲3.1	

=== Eggbuckland ===
The incumbent councillor, Ian Bowyer, was elected as a Conservative in 2018 but later sat as an independent.

Eggbuckland
Party	Candidate	Votes	%	±%
Conservative	Chip Tofan	1,679	50.3	▼10.5
Labour Co-op	Francesca Rees	1,133	33.9	▲5.1
Liberal Democrats	Dennis Draper	529	15.8	▲11.2
Turnout		3,341	33.1	▼4.3
Conservative hold		Swing	▼7.8	

=== Ham ===
Tuohy previously served as councillor for Ham, losing her seat in the 2021 election.

Ham
Party	Candidate	Votes	%	±%
Labour Co-op	Tina Tuohy	1,691	55.2	▼1.4
Conservative	Sonia Hosking	1,064	34.7	▲1.3
Green	Caroline Bennett	252	8.2	N/A
TUSC	Andrew White	58	1.9	N/A
Turnout		3,065	29.4	▼3.5
Labour hold		Swing	▼1.4	

=== Honicknowle ===
Honicknowle
Party	Candidate	Votes	%	±%
Labour Co-op	Zoë Reilly	1,608	57.2	▲4.9
Conservative	Margaret Boadella	1,003	35.7	▼3.2
Green	Benjamin Osborn	199	7.1	N/A
Turnout		2,810	27.1	▼5.1
Labour hold		Swing	▲4.1	

=== Moor View ===
Moor View
Party	Candidate	Votes	%	±%
Conservative	Maddi Bridgeman*	1,929	54.0	▲4.5
Labour	William Noble	1,303	36.5	▼3.3
Liberal Democrats	James Spencer	158	4.4	▲0.2
Green	James Ellwood	143	4.0	N/A
TUSC	Edison Notman	39	1.1	N/A
Turnout		3,572	34.8	▼2.6
Conservative hold		Swing	▲3.9	

=== Peverell ===
Peverell
Party	Candidate	Votes	%	±%
Labour	Jeremy Goslin*	2,549	56.0	▲8.4
Conservative	Tim Lever	1,520	33.4	▼9.2
Green	Nicholas Casley	249	5.5	▲2.0
Liberal Democrats	Sima Davarian-Dehsorkhe	143	3.1	▼2.7
Heritage	Bernard Toolan	92	2.0	N/A
Turnout		4,553	44.6	▼2.3
Labour hold		Swing	▲8.8	

=== Plympton Chaddlewood ===
Plympton Chaddlewood
Party	Candidate	Votes	%	±%
Green	Ian Poyser	1,273	57.7	N/A
Conservative	Glenn Jordan*	770	34.9	▼26.4
Labour	Christopher Cuddihee	163	7.4	▼23.6
Turnout		2,206	35.7	▲5.4
Green gain from Conservative		Swing	N/A	

=== Plympton St Mary ===
Plympton St Mary
Party	Candidate	Votes	%	±%
Conservative	Ian Darcy	2,146	64.7	▼6.1
Labour Co-op	Paul McNamara	793	23.9	▲1.2
Green	Lucy Mackay	377	11.4	N/A
TUSC	Alan Frost	91	2.7	N/A
Turnout		3,407	33.8	▼3.2
Conservative hold		Swing	▼3.7	

=== Plymstock Dunstone ===
Plymstock Dunstone
Party	Candidate	Votes	%	±%
Conservative	Vivien Pengelly*	1,907	49.1	▼15.3
Labour	John Stephens	1,540	39.7	▲15.5
Liberal Democrats	Katie McManus	243	6.2	▼5.1
Green	Frank Hartkopf	190	4.9	N/A
Turnout		3,880	38.55	▼0.05
Conservative hold		Swing	▼15.1	

=== Plymstock Radford ===
Plymstock Radford
Party	Candidate	Votes	%	±%
Conservative	Rebecca Smith*	2,055	52.3	▲3.6
Labour	Jon Davies	1,022	26.0	▲5.1
Independent	Neal Stoneman	339	8.6	N/A
Green	Byran Driver	294	7.5	▲0.3
Liberal Democrats	Roy Plumley	219	5.6	▼0.5
Turnout		3,929	35.1	▼2.4
Conservative hold		Swing	▲1.5	

=== Southway ===
Southway
Party	Candidate	Votes	%	±%
Conservative	Andy Lugger	1,153	36.8	▼2.1
Labour Co-op	Daniella Marley	1,140	36.4	▼16.2
Independent	Emily Quick	626	20.0	N/A
Green	Fi Smart	155	4.9	N/A
TUSC	Benjamin Davy	61	1.9	▼0.4
Turnout		3,135	31.0	▲0.8
Conservative gain from Labour		Swing	▲7.1	

=== St Budeaux ===
St Budeaux
Party	Candidate	Votes	%	±%
Labour	Sally Haydon*	1,262	47.1	▼2.1
Conservative	Adam Duffield	1,065	39.8	▼0.3
Independent	Terry Deans	190	7.1	N/A
Green	Leesa Alderton	162	6.0	N/A
Turnout		2,679	28.2	▼2.0
Labour hold		Swing	▼0.9	

=== St Peter and the Waterfront ===
St Peter and the Waterfront
Party	Candidate	Votes	%	±%
Labour Co-op	Sue McDonald*	1,990	56.1	▲1.6
Conservative	Jon Hill	1,049	29.6	▼4.3
Liberal Democrats	Hugh Janes	211	6.0	▼0.1
Change for Plymouth	Dean Bowles	189	5.3	N/A
TUSC	Ryan Aldred	106	3.0	▲1.9
Turnout		3,545	28.5	▼3.3
Labour hold		Swing	▲3.0	

=== Stoke ===
The previous councillor, Kevin Neil, was elected as Labour in 2018 but sat as an independent after being suspended from his party.

Stoke
Party	Candidate	Votes	%	±%
Labour	Tom Briars-Delve	1,968	58.8	▲6.3
Conservative	Marie-Desirée Rivière	906	27.1	▼6.3
Green	Nicholas Ireland	238	7.1	▲2.0
Liberal Democrats	Jacqui Spencer	179	5.3	▲0.3
TUSC	Nik Brookson	56	1.7	N/A
Turnout		3,347	33.4	▼2.6
Labour hold		Swing	▲6.3	

=== Sutton and Mount Gould ===
Sutton and Mount Gould
Party	Candidate	Votes	%	±%
Labour Co-op	Mary Aspinall*	1,740	57.1	▼6.6
Conservative	Grace Stickland	750	24.6	▼3.0
Green	Mike Kewish	225	7.4	N/A
Independent	Tinny Sivasothy	152	5.0	N/A
Liberal Democrats	Stuart Bonar	129	4.2	▼2.1
TUSC	Duncan Moore	53	1.7	▼0.7
Turnout		3,049	31.0	▼2.5
Labour hold		Swing	▼1.8	

== Aftermath ==
The council remained in no overall control. The Labour group leader and former council leader Tudor Evans said Labour had performed "better than anticipated" and that people "want the Tories gone". Ian Poyser, elected as the city's first Green Party councillor, said he wouldn't "any pacts or allegiances to either of those other two parties at this stage", referring to Labour and the Conservatives, saying he would try to enable "cross-party working in the background". The independent councillor George Wheeler, who had originally been elected as a Labour candidate, joined the Green Party later in May. Wheeler said he had left the Labour group, and later the Labour Party, because he "could no longer work with Plymouth's Labour leadership". The Plymouth Herald reported that Bingley was planning to invite independent councillors who had left the Conservative group to rejoin. One Conservative councillor, Dan Collins for Plympton Chaddlewood, and one former Conservative independent councillor, Shannon Burden, continued to serve as councillors despite having moved to Gloucestershire. The independent councillors Lynda Bowyer, Shannon Burden, Nigel Churchill, Stephen Hulme and Kathy Watkin rejoined the Conservative group on 17 May, meaning that the Conservative Party held a majority of seats on the council.
