= Dylan Tippetts =

British Liberal Democrats politician

Plymouth City Councillor for Compton ward
- In office 6 May 2022 – 7 May 2026
- Preceded by: Andrea Johnson
- Succeeded by: Helen Kelly

Personal details
- Born: 2 December 2000 (age 25) Taunton, Somerset
- Party: Liberal Democrats
- Other political affiliations: Independent (2025); Labour (until 2025)
- Education: University of Plymouth

Dylan James Tippetts (born 2 December 2000) is a British politician who served as councillor for Compton in Plymouth from 2022 until 2026. He was Plymouth City Council's first openly transgender councillor and one of the first trans councillors in the UK.

== Early life ==
Dylan Tippetts was born in Taunton in Somerset on 2 December 2000, and grew up in Bridgwater. He came out as transgender in 2018, and moved to Plymouth shortly after. At time of election, he was a law student at the University of Plymouth.

== Political career ==
Tippetts stood as the Labour Co-operative candidate for Compton ward in the 2022 Plymouth City Council election. He won the seat, becoming the ward's first Labour councillor. His election also saw him become the first trans councillor in the city. Speaking about winning the seat, he said:

“If I can help someone realise that trans people are just normal human beings like everyone else, with the same hopes and dreams, (and) just help dial down some of the real hate and division at the moment, that would be incredible. It would be even more of an honour to show a young person who might be scared of coming out that everything’s going to be OK and everything that they want in life can come true.”

On 9 May 2025 Tippetts resigned as a member of the Labour Party, and announced he would be sitting for his final year on Plymouth City Council as an independent councillor. He cited the Labour Party's lack of support for transgender people. In his resignation statement, he said:

"The Labour Party nationally has thrown transgender people under the bus and has taken us backwards decades. Everyone deserves the right to live peacefully, and the Labour Party continues to deny transgender people that basic right.I cannot continue to represent a party that does not support my fundamental rights. I cannot as a trans person continue to support the Labour Party."

Despite stating that he would serve the rest of his term as an independent, on 15 May 2025 he announced he had joined the Liberal Democrats.

== Personal life ==
Tippetts lives in Mutley Plain in Plymouth.
