= Plymouth City Council =

Unitary local authority for Plymouth, Devon

Type
- Type: Unitary authority of Plymouth

History
- Founded: 1 April 1974

Leadership
- Lord Mayor: Kevin Sproston, Labour since 22 May 2026
- Leader: Tudor Evans, Labour since 19 May 2023
- Chief Executive: Tracey Lee since October 2012

Structure
- Seats: 57 councillors
- Graph of the party split among 57 seats.
- Political groups: Administration (30) Labour (30) Other parties (27) Reform (12) Green (3) Conservative (3) Restore (2) Independent (7)

Elections
- Voting system: Plurality-at-large
- Last election: 7 May 2026
- Next election: 6 May 2027

Meeting place
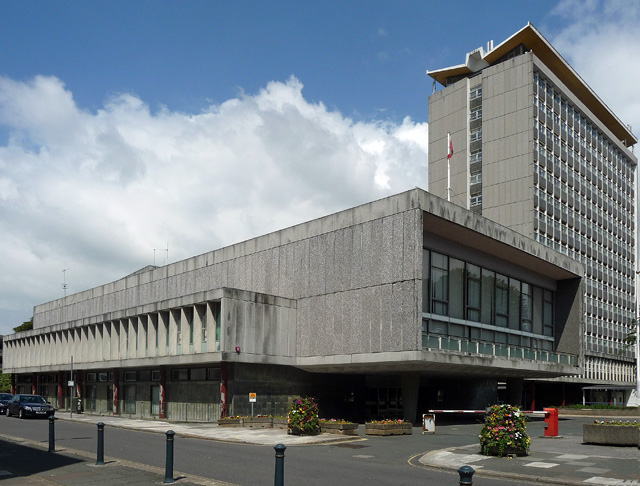
- Council House, Armada Way, Plymouth, PL1 2AA

Website
- www.plymouth.gov.uk

Constitution
- The Constitution and rule book of Plymouth City Council

Plymouth City Council is the local authority for the city of Plymouth, in the ceremonial county of Devon, England. Plymouth has had a council since 1439, which has been reformed on numerous occasions. Since 1998 the council has been a unitary authority, being a district council which also performs the functions of a county council; it is independent from Devon County Council.

The council has been under Labour majority control since 2023. It meets at the Council House in the city centre and has its main offices at Ballard House in the Millbay area of the city. The population of the unitary authority is 277,695.

== History ==
Plymouth was an ancient borough, having been incorporated in 1439. It was reformed to become a municipal borough in 1836, governed by a corporate body officially called the "mayor, aldermen and burgesses of the borough of Plymouth", but generally known as the corporation or town council. When elected county councils were established in 1889, Plymouth was considered large enough for its existing corporation to provide county-level services and so it was made a county borough, independent from Devon County Council.

In 1914 Plymouth absorbed the neighbouring towns of Devonport and East Stonehouse. The enlarged Plymouth was awarded city status on 18 October 1928, after which the corporation's formal title was the "mayor, aldermen and citizens of the city of Plymouth", also known as the city council. The position of mayor was raised to a lord mayor in 1935.

In 1974 Plymouth became a lower-tier non-metropolitan district under the Local Government Act 1972, with Devon County Council providing county-level services to the city for the first time. Plymouth's city status was re-conferred on the reformed district, allowing the council to take the name Plymouth City Council.

Plymouth regained its independence from the county council on 1 April 1998 when it was made a unitary authority following the recommendations of the Banham Commission. The way this change was implemented was to create a new non-metropolitan county of Plymouth covering the same area as the existing district, but with no separate county council; instead the existing city council took on county council functions, making it a unitary authority. This therefore had the effect of restoring the city council to the powers it had held when Plymouth had been a county borough prior to 1974. The city remains part of the ceremonial county of Devon for the purposes of lieutenancy.

== Governance ==
As a unitary authority, Plymouth City Council has the responsibilities of both a district council and county council combined. There are no civil parishes in the city. Some functions are carried out in partnership with neighbouring authorities, notably with the city council appointing four members to the Devon and Somerset Combined Fire Authority. The council is also responsible for arranging elections both for its own councillors and for three Parliamentary constituencies: Plymouth Moor View; Plymouth, Sutton and Devonport; and South West Devon.

=== Political control ===
The council has been under Labour majority control since the 2023 election.

Political control of the council since the 1974 reforms has been as follows:

Lower tier non-metropolitan district

Party in control	Years
Conservative	1974–1991
Labour	1991–1998

Unitary authority

Party in control	Years
Labour	1998–2000
Conservative	2000–2003
Labour	2003–2006
No overall control	2006–2006
Labour	2006–2007
Conservative	2007–2012
Labour	2012–2015
No overall control	2015–2017
Conservative	2017–2018
Labour	2018–2021
No overall control	2021–2022
Conservative	2022–2022
No overall control	2022–2023
Labour	2023–present

=== Leadership ===
The role of Lord Mayor is largely ceremonial in Plymouth. Political leadership is instead provided by the leader of the council. The leaders since 1974 have been:

Councillor	Party	From	To
George Creber	Conservative	1 Apr 1974	Jan 1987
Tom Savery	Conservative	Jan 1987	1991
John Ingham	Labour	1991	May 1998
Tudor Evans	Labour	May 1998	May 2000
Patrick Nicholson	Conservative	May 2000	2002
Kevin Wigens	Conservative	2002	May 2003
Tudor Evans	Labour	May 2003	May 2007
Vivien Pengelly	Conservative	May 2007	May 2012
Tudor Evans	Labour	18 May 2012	20 May 2016
Ian Bowyer	Conservative	20 May 2016	May 2018
Tudor Evans	Labour	18 May 2018	May 2021
Nick Kelly	Conservative	21 May 2021	21 Mar 2022
Richard Bingley	Conservative	21 Mar 2022	27 Mar 2023
Tudor Evans	Labour	19 May 2023	

=== Composition ===
Following the 2026 election and subsequent changes up to August 2026, the composition of the council was:

Party	Seats
Labour	30
Reform	12
Green	3
Conservative	3
Restore	2
Independent	7
Total	57

== Premises ==
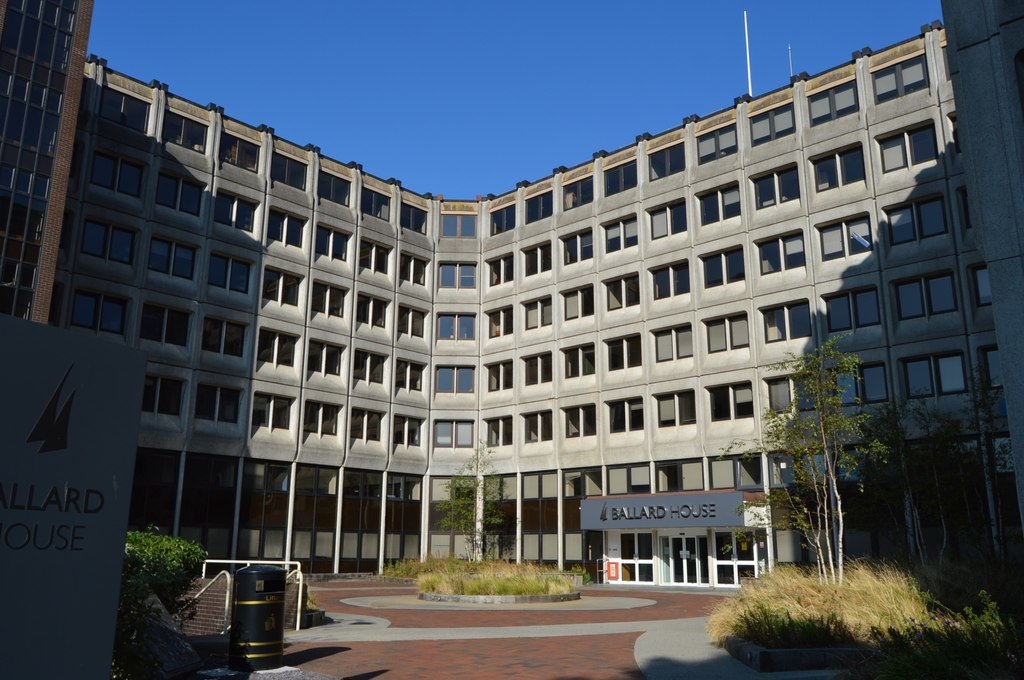
Ballard House, West Hoe Road, Plymouth, PL1 3BJ: Council's main offices since 2014.

The council meets at the Council House on Armada Way in the city centre, being the southern wing of the former Civic Centre, built in 1962, which was made a listed building in 2007. The council's main offices are at Ballard House on West Hoe Road adjoining the docks in the Millbay area of the city, having moved there from the tower block wing of the Civic Centre in 2014. The tower block wing of the Civic Centre was sold to developers Urban Splash in 2015 and later re-purchased to be redeveloped into a City College Plymouth campus in 2024.

== Elections ==
Since the last boundary changes in 2003 the council has comprised 57 councillors representing 20 wards, with each ward electing two or three councillors. Elections are held three years out of every four, with a third of the council elected each time for a four-year term of office.

=== Ward and councillors ===
The wards and current councillors (as at May 2026) are as follows:

Ward	Elected 2023	Elected 2024	Elected 2026
Budshead	Kevin Sproston (Lab)	Alison Simpson (Lab)	Nicola Cooke (Ref)
Compton	Angela Penrose (Lab)	Matt Smith (Lab)	Helen Kelly (Ref)
Devonport	Mark Coker (Note: Cabinet member) (Lab)	Anne Freeman (Lab)	Paul Rielly (Ref)
Drake	Steve Ricketts (Note: Originally elected as an independent candidate) (Ref)	No election	Saahi Aroori (Grn)
Efford and Lipson	Pauline Murphy (Lab)	Paul McNamara (Lab)	Chris Sharpe (Ref)
Eggbuckland	Tess Blight (Lab)	Chris Wood (Con)	Paul Hagan (Ref)
Ham	Tudor Evans (Note: Leader of the council) (Lab)	Kate Taylor (Lab)	Ben Rowe (Ref)
Honicknowle	Keith Moore (Lab)	Ray Morton (Lab)	Shaun Hooper (Ref)
Moor View	Lindsay Gilmour (Lab)	Will Noble (Lab)	Andrew Crumplin (Ref)
Peverell	Sarah Allen (Lab)	Jamie Bannerman (Lab)	Jeremy Goslin (Lab)
Plympton Chaddlewood	No election	Lauren McLay (Grn)	Angie Smith (Ref)
Plympton Erle	Terri Beer (Ind. Group)	Andrea Loveridge (Ind. Group)	No election
Plympton St Mary	Patrick Nicholson (Ind. Group)	Sally Nicholson (Ind. Group)	Vanessa Tyler (Ref)
Plymstock Dunstone	John Stephens (Lab)	Maria Lawson (Lab)	Grace Stickland (Ref)
Plymstock Radford	Kathy Watkin (Con)	Daniel Steel (Lab)	John Mahony (Con)
Southway	Mark Lowry (Lab)	Carol Ney (Note: Originally elected as a Labour candidate) (Ref)	Jacqueline Sansom (Ref)
St Budeaux	Jon Dingle (Lab)	Josh McCarty (Lab)	Mark Hadfield (Ref)
St Peter and the Waterfront	Chris Penberthy (Lab)	Lewis Allison (Lab)	Andy Rose (Ref)
Stoke	Jemima Laing (Lab)	Sally Cresswell (Lab)	Tom Briars-Delve (Lab)
Sutton and Mount Gould	Sue Dann (Lab)	Chris Cuddihee (Lab)	Byran Driver (Grn)

== Lord Mayoralty ==
Plymouth has had a mayor in some form since 1439, and this tradition continued until 1934, when the king granted Plymouth the honour of having a Lord Mayor.

The role of the Lord Mayor is largely ceremonial, and has evolved into a figurehead position which is the public, non-political image of Plymouth City Council. The Lord Mayor chairs council meetings in the Council Chamber. The position usually rotates between the Conservatives and Labour, and is chosen on the third Friday of May. The Lord Mayor chooses the Deputy Lord Mayor.

The Lord Mayor's official residence is 3 Elliot Terrace, on the Hoe. Once a home of Waldorf and Nancy Astor, it was given by Lady Astor to the City of Plymouth as an official residence for future Lord Mayors and is also used today for civic hospitality, as lodgings for visiting dignitaries and High Court judges, and is available to hire for private events.

== Coat of arms ==
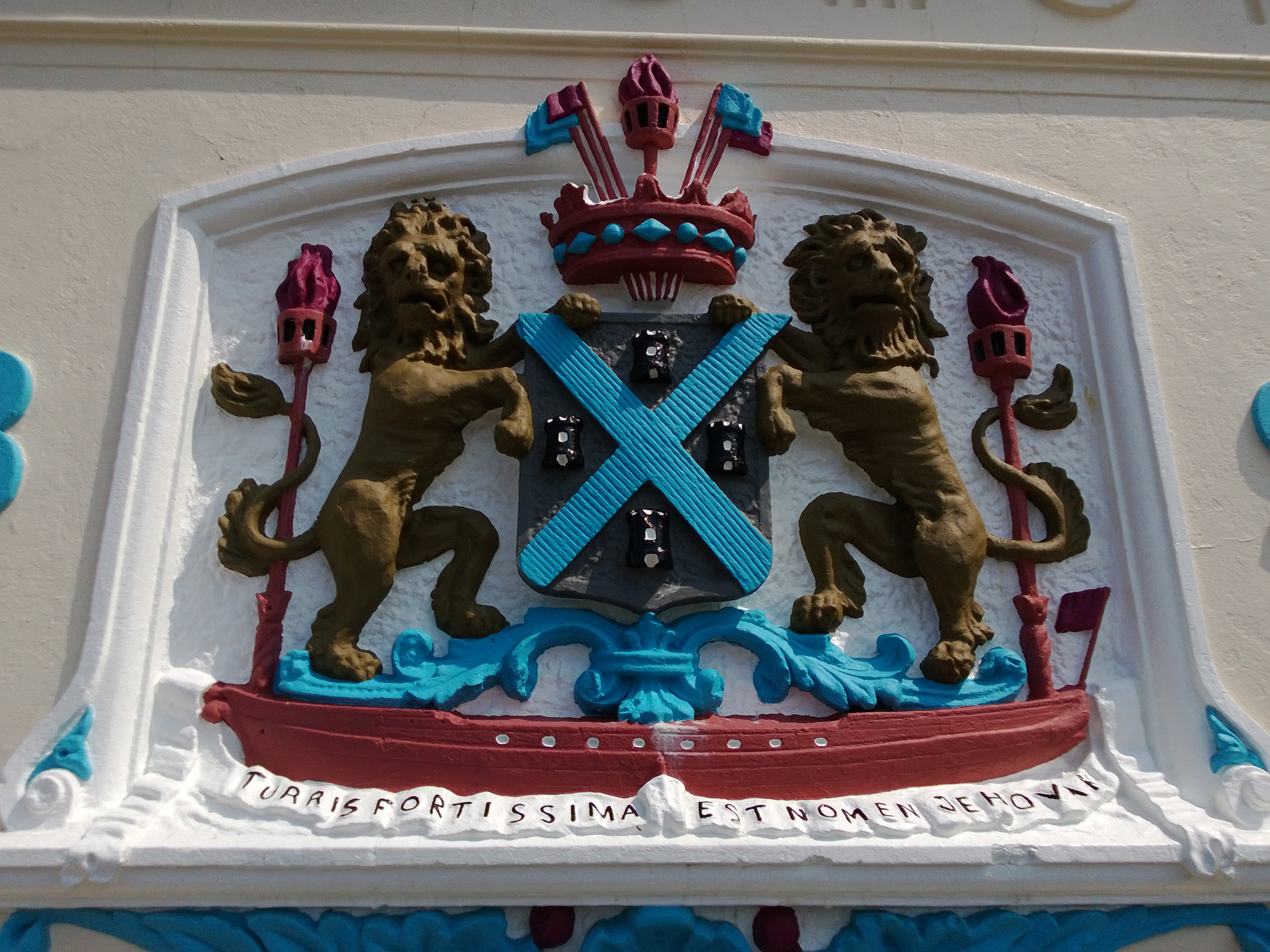
The coat of arms of the City of Plymouth

The coat of arms of the City of Plymouth shows the four towers of the old Plymouth Castle, with the saltire of Saint Andrew, who is the patron of Plymouth's oldest church. The crest is a blue naval crown with a red anchor held in a lion's paw. The crown and anchor were part of the crest of the former County Borough of Devonport and represent the importance of the Royal Navy in the life of the city. The Latin motto, Turris Fortissima est Nomen Jehova, means "The name of Jehovah is the strongest tower".
