= City College Plymouth =

Coordinates: 50°22′25″N 4°10′1″W

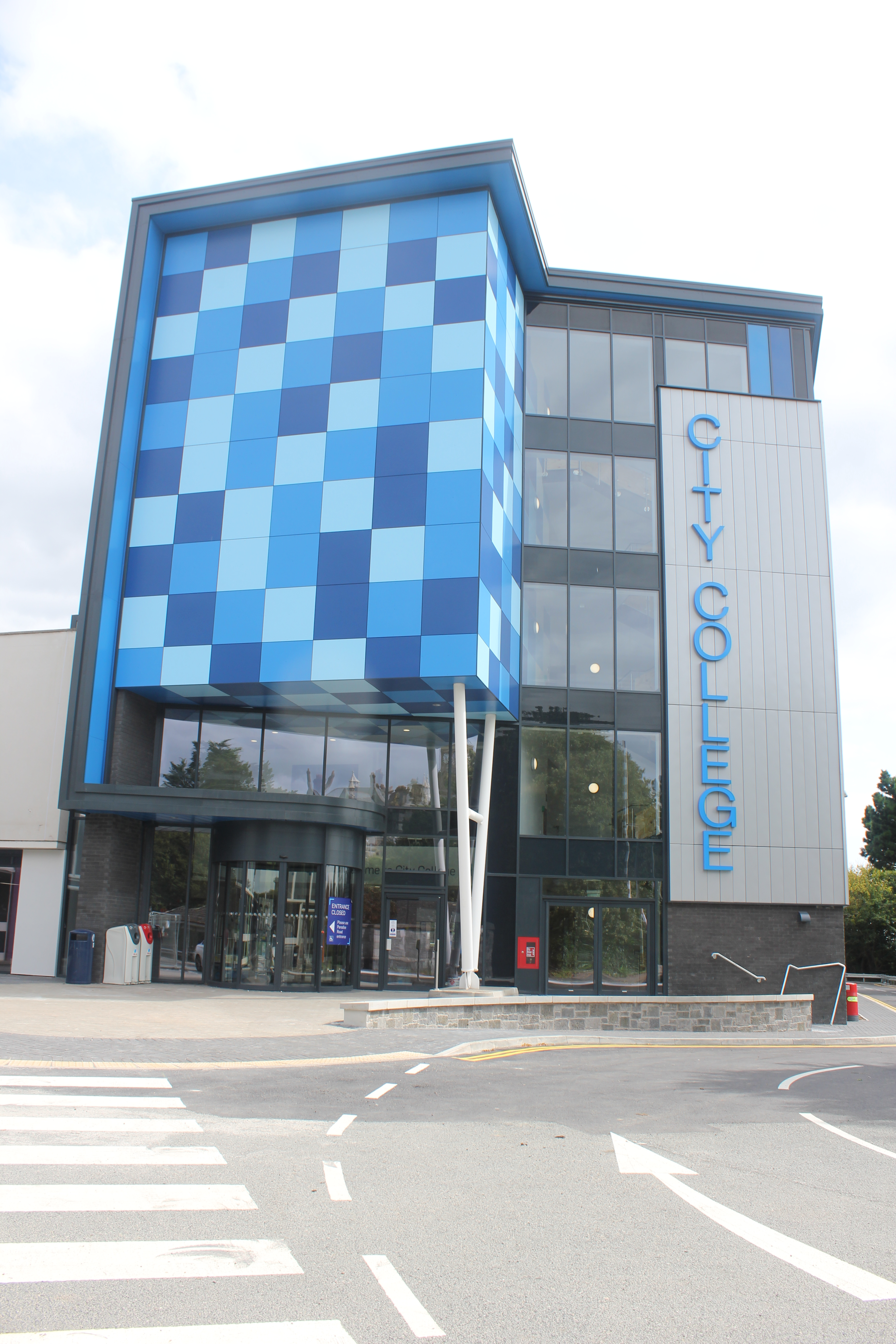
- Plymouth; England

Information
- Type: Further Education College
- Website: www.cityplym.ac.uk

City College Plymouth is a tertiary institution and further education college in South West England offering a range of technical, professional and vocational qualifications, Apprenticeships, Access to Higher Education and Foundation Degree courses, plus professional and bespoke training to local employers.

The college is a partner college of the University of Plymouth, who support their Foundation Degree provision.

Originally the Plymouth and Devonport Technical College, which opened in 1897 in Paradise Road, it was relocated in new premises built on a former railway station site directly opposite at Kings Road, where it opened as the College of Further Education, Plymouth, in 1970. Later becoming the Plymouth College of Further Education, it was officially renamed on 1 January 2007.

== Campuses and facilities ==
The college opened a £13m Regional Centre of Excellence for STEM (science, technology, engineering and maths) in September 2017. This centre, which aims to train students in key priority sectors for the city, replicates 'real work' environments across a range of industry sectors. The centre is supported by the Heart of the South West Local Enterprise Partnership (LEP) Growth Deal, DBIS Regional Growth Fund and Plymouth City Council.

== Alumni ==
- John Van der Kiste, author
