= 2012 Plymouth City Council election =

2012 UK local government election

← 2011	3 May 2012	2014 →

19 of the 57 seats to Plymouth City Council 29 seats needed for a majority
	First party	Second party	Third party
Leader	Tudor Evans	Vivien Pengelly	None
Party	Labour	Conservative	UKIP
Last election	25	32	0
Seats before	25	31	1
Seats won	12	7	0
Seats after	31	26	0
Seat change	▲6	▼5	▼1
Popular vote	25,261	17,968	11,935
Percentage	43.6%	31.0%	20.6%
- Map showing the results of contested positions in the 2012 Plymouth City Council elections.
Council control before election
Conservative
Council control after election
Labour

The 2012 Plymouth City Council election took place on 3 May 2012 to elect members of Plymouth City Council in England. This was on the same day as other local elections. The election was won by the Labour Party, who gained control of the council from the Conservative Party.

== Background ==
Plymouth City Council held local elections on 7 May 2012 as part of the 2012 local elections. The council elects its councillors in thirds, with a third being up for election every year for three years, with no election in the fourth year. Councillors defending their seats in this election were previously elected in 2008. In that election, fourteen Conservative candidates and five Labour candidates were elected.

Ahead of the election, the council was split between the Labour Party and the Conservative Party, with the Conservatives having held a majority for five years.

== Overall results ==
2012 Plymouth City Council Election
Party	Seats	Gains	Losses	Net gain/loss	Seats %	Votes %	Votes	+/−
Labour	12	6	0	▲6	63.2	43.6	25,261	▲16.5
Conservative	7	0	5	▼5	36.8	31.0	17,968	▼16.3
Liberal Democrats	0	0	0	Steady	0.0	3.0	1,741	▼10.7
UKIP	0	0	1	▼1	0.0	20.6	11,935	▲16.1
Green	0	0	0	Steady	0.0	1.6	921	▼3.0
TUSC	0	0	0	Steady	0.0	0.1	85	New
Vivamus	0	0	0	Steady	0.0	0.0	25	New
Total	19						57,936	

Note: All changes in vote share are in comparison to the corresponding 2008 election.

The Conservatives lost their overall majority on the council to the Labour Party.

After the previous election, the composition of the council was:

32	25
Conservative	Labour

Before this election, the composition of the council was:

31	25	1
Conservative	Labour	UKIP

After this election, the composition of the council was:

↓
31	26
Labour	Conservative

== Ward results ==
Plymouth City Council maintains records of past election results.

=== Budshead ===
Location of Budshead ward

Budshead 2012
Party	Candidate	Votes	%
Labour	Jon Taylor	1,626	45.9
Conservative	Jack Thompson	1,375	30.4
UKIP	Hugh Williams	544	12.0
Majority		241	1.9
Turnout		4,525	36.8
Labour gain from Conservative			

=== Compton ===
Location of Compton ward

Compton 2012
Party	Candidate	Votes	%
Conservative	Richard Ball	1,233	40.4
Labour	Neil Hendy	840	27.5
UKIP	Michael Cooke	560	18.3
Green	Colin Trier	221	7.2
Liberal Democrats	Steven Smith	198	6.5
Majority		397	12.9
Turnout			33.5
Conservative hold			

=== Devonport ===
Location of Devonport ward

Devonport 2012
Party	Candidate	Votes	%
Labour	Kate Taylor	1,309	52.0
UKIP	Syd Brooks	470	18.7
Conservative	Diane Jasper-Eustis	445	17.7
Liberal Democrats	John Brooks	176	7.0
Green	Andrew Pratt	117	4.6
Majority		839	33.3
Turnout			27.1
Labour hold			

=== Efford and Lipson ===
Location of Efford and Lipson ward

Efford and Lipson 2012
Party	Candidate	Votes	%
Labour Co-op	Brian Vincent	1,823	65.2
UKIP	Ray Fereday	519	18.6
Conservative	Judy Tottey	455	16.3
Majority		1,304	46.6
Turnout			30.6
Labour hold			

=== Eggbuckland ===
Location of Eggbuckland ward

Eggbuckland 2012
Party	Candidate	Votes	%
Labour	Paul Jarvis	1,419	39.5
Conservative	Peter Brookshaw	1,357	37.8
UKIP	Roger Thomas	816	22.7
Majority		62	1.7
Turnout			34.7
Labour gain from Conservative			

=== Ham ===
Location of Ham ward

Ham 2012
Party	Candidate	Votes	%
Labour	Tina Tuohy	1,667	58.6
UKIP	John Read	660	23.2
Conservative	David Downie	520	18.3
Majority		1,007	35.4
Turnout			31.3
Labour hold			

=== Honicknowle ===
Location of Honicknowle ward

Honicknowle 2012
Party	Candidate	Votes	%
Labour	Pete Smith	1,560	56.2
UKIP	Ron Northcott	715	25.7
Conservative	Paul Rielly	367	13.2
Green	David Wildman	136	4.9
Majority		845	30.5
Turnout			27.4
Labour hold			

=== Moor View ===
Location of Moor View ward

Moor View 2012
Party	Candidate	Votes	%
Labour Co-op	Mike Fox	1,703	51.4
Conservative	Mark Christie	919	27.7
UKIP	Stuart Munnery	573	17.3
Liberal Democrats	Richard Bray	117	3.5
Majority		784	23.7
Turnout			36.0
Labour gain from Conservative			

=== Peverell ===
Location of Peverell ward

Peverell 2012
Party	Candidate	Votes	%
Conservative	Patricia Nicholson	1,320	37.4
Labour	Stephen Randall	1,211	34.3
UKIP	Catherine Bullock	499	14.1
Green	Wendy Miller	289	8.2
Liberal Democrats	Richard Lawrie	190	5.4
Vivamus	Bernard Toolan	25	0.7
Majority		109	3.1
Turnout			35.1
Conservative hold			

=== Plympton Chaddlewood ===
Location of Plympton Chaddlewood ward

Plympton Chaddlewood 2012
Party	Candidate	Votes	%
Conservative	David Salter	704	44.2
Labour	Mark Thompson	478	30.0
UKIP	Jonathan Frost	411	25.8
Majority		226	14.2
Turnout			25.7
Conservative hold			

=== Plympton Erle ===
Location of Plympton Erle ward

Plympton Erle 2012
Party	Candidate	Votes	%
Conservative	Ian Darcy	900	38.0
Labour	Chris Mavin	739	31.2
UKIP	John Roberts	480	20.3
Liberal Democrats	Peter York	248	10.5
Majority		161	6.8
Turnout			34.8
Conservative hold			

=== Plympton St Mary ===
Location of Plympton St Mary ward

Plympton St Mary 2012
Party	Candidate	Votes	%
Conservative	Sam Leaves	1,542	44.7
Labour	Seetha Cheesman	1,034	30.0
UKIP	Steve Stephenson	875	25.4
Majority		508	14.7
Turnout			34.6
Conservative hold			

=== Plymstock Dunstone ===
Location of Plymstock Dunstone ward

Plymstock Dunstone 2012
Party	Candidate	Votes	%
Conservative	Kevin Wigens	1,542	44.0
UKIP	David Salmon	1,138	32.4
Labour	Prathees Kishore	828	23.6
Majority		404	11.6
Turnout			36.3
Conservative hold			

=== Plymstock Radford ===
Location of Plymstock Radford ward

Plymstock Radford 2012
Party	Candidate	Votes	%
Conservative	Michael Leaves	1,282	37.9
UKIP	John Wheeler	1,010	29.9
Labour Co-op	Shirley Smith	912	27.0
Liberal Democrats	Jonathan Byatt	179	5.3
Majority		172	8.0
Turnout			34.7
Conservative hold			

=== Southway ===
Location of Southway ward

Southway 2012
Party	Candidate	Votes	%
Labour	Lorraine Parker	1,845	51.3
Conservative	Brian Roberts	967	26.9
UKIP	Peter Berrow	785	21.8
Majority		878	24.4
Turnout			36.4
Labour gain from UKIP			

Note: Peter Berrow won this seat for the Conservative Party the previous time it was contested in 2008, but defected to UKIP in January 2012.

=== St Budeaux ===
Location of St Budeaux ward

St Budeaux 2012
Party	Candidate	Votes	%
Labour	Danny Damarell	1,817	61.1
UKIP	Mark Burton	592	19.9
Conservative	Charlotte Bladen	470	15.8
Liberal Democrats	Jon May	97	3.3
Majority		1,225	41.2
Turnout			31.9
Labour hold			

=== Stoke ===
Location of Stoke ward

Stoke 2012
Party	Candidate	Votes	%
Labour	Sam Davey	1,602	46.5
Conservative	Craig Duncan	1,205	35.0
UKIP	Fiona Hurst-Baird	443	12.9
Liberal Democrats	Fleur Ball	197	5.7
Majority		397	11.5
Turnout			37.1
Labour gain from Conservative			

=== St Peter and the Waterfront ===
Location of St Peter and the Waterfront ward

St Peter and the Waterfront 2012
Party	Candidate	Votes	%
Labour	Ian Tuffin	1,445	49.7
Conservative	Tam McPherson	805	27.7
UKIP	Roy Kettle	444	15.3
Liberal Democrats	Hugh Janes	215	7.4
Majority		640	22.0
Turnout			31.1
Labour gain from Conservative			

=== Sutton and Mount Gould ===
Location of Sutton and Mount Gould ward

Sutton and Mount Gould 2012
Party	Candidate	Votes	%
Labour	Eddie Rennie	1,403	51.4
Conservative	Nick Kelly	560	20.5
UKIP	Jonquil Webber	401	14.7
Green	Tean Mitchell	158	5.8
Liberal Democrats	Paul Huntley	124	4.5
TUSC	Louise Parker	85	3.1
Majority		843	30.9
Turnout			29.6
Labour hold			

== Aftermath ==
Following the election, the Labour Party had an overall majority on the council, meaning their group leader Tudor Evans returned as council leader. Labour's newly elected councillor in Devonport, Kate Taylor, was one of the youngest councillors in the country at eighteen years old. Despite significantly increasing its overall vote count, the UK Independence Party lost its only seat on the council.
