= 2007 Plymouth City Council election =

2007 UK local government election

← 2006	3 May 2007	2008 →

19 of the 57 seats to Plymouth City Council 29 seats needed for a majority
	First party	Second party	Third party
Party	Conservative	Labour	Liberal Democrats
Last election	25	28	3
Seats before	26^{†}	29	2^{†}
Seats won	11	8	0
Seats after	31	26	0
Seat change	▲5	▼3	▼2
Popular vote	28,199	19,591	9,959
Percentage	43.1%	29.9%	15.2%
- Map showing the results of contested wards in the 2007 Plymouth City Council elections.^{†} Councillor John Lock of Plympton Erle ward defected from the Liberal Democrats to the Conservatives in January 2007.
Council control before election
Labour
Council control after election
Conservative

The 2007 Plymouth City Council election was held on 3 May 2007 to elect members of Plymouth City Council in England. One third of the council was up for election and the Conservative Party gained control of the council from the Labour Party.

== Overall results ==
2007 Plymouth City Council Election
Party	Seats	Gains	Losses	Net gain/loss	Seats %	Votes %	Votes	+/−
Conservative	11	5	0	▲5	57.9	43.1	28,199	
Labour	8	1	4	▼3	42.1	29.9	19,591	
Liberal Democrats	0	0	2	▼2	0.0	15.2	9,959	
UKIP	0	0	0	Steady	0.0	2.9	1,896	
Green	0	0	0	Steady	0.0	4.2	2,718	
Independent	0	0	0	Steady	0.0	4.0	2,597	
BNP	0	0	0	Steady	0.0	0.8	498	
Total	19						65,458	

== Ward results ==
=== Budshead ===
Location of Budshead ward

Budshead 2007
Party	Candidate	Votes	%
Conservative	Jonathan Drean	1,731	47.5%
Labour	Michael Fox	1,387	38.0%
Liberal Democrats	Janet Crocker	528	14.5%
Majority		344	9.4%
Turnout		3,646	38.7%
Conservative gain from Labour			

=== Compton ===
Location of Compton ward

Compton 2007
Party	Candidate	Votes	%
Conservative	David Stark	2,025	52.6%
Liberal Democrats	Steve Smith	776	20.2%
Labour	Margaret Storer	599	15.6%
Green	Josie Bannon	236	6.1%
UKIP	Ronald Coombes	212	5.5%
Majority		1,249	32.5%
Turnout		3,848	42.8%
Conservative hold			

=== Devonport ===
Location of Devonport ward

Devonport 2007
Party	Candidate	Votes	%
Labour	Mark Coker	1,258	44.2%
Conservative	Jim Bell	854	30.0%
Liberal Democrats	Sarah Flockton	416	14.6%
UKIP	Syd Brooks	316	11.1%
Majority		404	14.2%
Turnout		2,844	31.6%
Labour gain from Liberal Democrats			

Note: The seat was won for Labour the previous time it was contested in 2003, by Bernard Brotherton who subsequently defected to the Liberal Democrats.

=== Drake ===
Location of Drake ward

Drake 2007
Party	Candidate	Votes	%
Conservative	Andy Fox	542	31.9%
Liberal Democrats	Karen Gillard	527	31.0%
Labour	Carol Blackburn	289	17.0%
Green	Saul Walker	137	8.1%
Independent	David Santillo	133	7.8%
UKIP	Andrew Leigh	71	4.2%
Majority		15	0.9%
Turnout		1,699	27.0%
Conservative gain from Liberal Democrats			

=== Efford and Lipson ===
Location of Efford and Lipson ward

Efford and Lipson 2007
Party	Candidate	Votes	%
Labour	Claude Miller	1,346	42.4%
Conservative	Mary Orchard	994	31.3%
Liberal Democrats	Stephen Goldthorp	568	17.9%
Green	Tean Mitchell	263	8.3%
Majority		352	11.1%
Turnout		3,171	33.3%
Labour hold			

=== Eggbuckland ===
Location of Eggbuckland ward

Eggbuckland 2007
Party	Candidate	Votes	%
Conservative	Lynda Bowyer	1,847	44.6%
Labour	Derick Bray	1,155	27.9%
Independent	Lee Finn	502	12.1%
Liberal Democrats	Robert McVicar	492	11.9%
Green	Raymond Delamare	141	3.4%
Majority		692	16.7%
Turnout		4,137	40.8%
Conservative gain from Labour			

=== Ham ===
Location of Ham ward

Ham 2007
Party	Candidate	Votes	%
Labour	Tudor Evans	1,460	44.4%
Conservative	Stuart Charles	1,227	37.4%
Liberal Democrats	Emma Swann	598	18.2%
Majority		233	7.1%
Turnout		3,285	34.2%
Labour hold			

=== Honicknowle ===
Location of Honicknowle ward

Honicknowle 2007
Party	Candidate	Votes	%
Labour	Mark Lowry	1,272	38.2%
Conservative	Edward Delbridge	753	22.6%
Independent	Paul Carter	669	20.1%
Liberal Democrats	Gillian Hirst	349	10.5%
Independent	Ivor Lucas	178	5.3%
Green	Daniel Knaeble	108	3.2%
Majority		519	15.6%
Turnout		3,329	32.7%
Labour hold			

=== Moor View ===
Location of Moor View ward

Moor View 2007
Party	Candidate	Votes	%
Labour	Susan Dann	1,506	40.3%
Conservative	Anna Chapman	1,444	38.7%
Liberal Democrats	David Jolly	357	9.6%
Independent	Geoffrey Shepherdson	292	7.8%
Green	Nicola Bannon	136	3.6%
Majority		62	1.7%
Turnout		3,735	39.8%
Labour hold			

=== Peverell ===
Location of Peverell ward

Peverell 2007
Party	Candidate	Votes	%
Conservative	John Mahony	2,228	52.5%
Liberal Democrats	Deborah Earl	792	18.7%
Labour	John Sewell	693	16.3%
Green	Don Allen	349	8.2%
UKIP	Graeme Peters	182	4.3%
Majority		1,436	33.8%
Turnout		4,244	43.4%
Labour hold			

=== Plympton Erle ===
Location of Plympton Erle ward

Plympton Erle 2007
Party	Candidate	Votes	%
Conservative	Terri Beer	1,331	49.2%
Liberal Democrats	Paul Rowe	514	19.0%
Labour	Ross Burns	449	16.6%
UKIP	John Roberts	172	6.4%
BNP	Mark Cooper	144	5.3%
Green	Colin Bannon	93	3.4%
Majority		817	30.2%
Turnout		2,703	39.2%
Liberal Democrats hold			

=== Plympton St Mary ===
Location of Plympton St Mary ward

Plympton St Mary 2007
Party	Candidate	Votes	%
Conservative	Partick Nicholson	2,807	67.9%
Liberal Democrats	Geoffrey Dustan	681	16.5%
Labour	Steven Lemin	463	11.2%
Green	Nicola Hawker	186	4.5%
Majority		2,126	51.4%
Turnout		4,137	42.2%
Conservative hold			

=== Plymstock Dunstone ===
Location of Plymstock Dunstone ward

Plymstock Dunstone 2007
Party	Candidate	Votes	%
Conservative	David Viney	2,666	65.8%
Labour	Kenneth Morrish	666	16.4%
Liberal Democrats	Charlotte Smith	507	12.5%
Green	Wendy Miller	213	5.3%
Majority		2,000	49.4%
Turnout		4,052	41.0%
Conservative hold			

=== Plymstock Radford ===
Location of Plymstock Radford ward

Plymstock Radford 2007
Party	Candidate	Votes	%
Conservative	Ken Foster	1,958	50.8%
Labour	Valerie Burns	599	15.6%
Liberal Democrats	Matthew Radmore	409	10.6%
UKIP	Roger Bullock	408	10.6%
Independent	Roger Dodd	328	8.5%
Green	Colin Trier	150	3.9%
Majority		1,359	35.3%
Turnout		3,852	41.0%
Conservative hold			

=== St Budeaux ===
Location of St Budeaux ward

St Budeaux 2007
Party	Candidate	Votes	%
Labour	George Wheeler	1,317	42.9%
Conservative	Peter Berrow	900	29.3%
Liberal Democrats	Raymond McSweeney	437	14.2%
Independent	Tom Williams	416	13.6%
Majority		417	13.6%
Turnout		3,070	32.8%
Labour hold			

=== St Peter and the Waterfront ===
Location of St Peter and the Waterfront ward

St Peter and the Waterfront 2007
Party	Candidate	Votes	%
Labour	Mark King	1,138	36.1%
Conservative	Richard Ball	1,060	33.7%
Liberal Democrats	Hugh Janes	395	12.5%
UKIP	Ray Rees	312	9.9%
Green	Clare O'Neill	166	5.3%
Independent	Jo Jo	79	2.5%
Majority		78	2.5%
Turnout		3,150	33.5%
Labour hold			

=== Southway ===
Location of Southway ward

Southway 2007
Party	Candidate	Votes	%
Conservative	Brian Roberts	1,547	40.1%
Labour	Pauline Murphy	1,520	39.4%
Liberal Democrats	Jane Barwick	441	11.4%
BNP	Robert Perkins	354	9.2%
Majority		27	0.7%
Turnout		3,862	41.1%
Conservative gain from Labour			

=== Stoke ===
Location of Stoke ward

Stoke 2007
Party	Candidate	Votes	%
Conservative	Joan Watkins	1,459	39.7%
Labour	Michael Fletcher	1,182	32.2%
Liberal Democrats	Mike Gillbard	595	16.2%
UKIP	Richard Ellison	223	6.1%
Green	Nicholas Byrne	217	5.9%
Majority		277	7.5%
Turnout		3,676	38.6%
Conservative gain from Labour			

=== Sutton and Mount Gould ===
Location of Sutton and Mount Gould ward

Sutton and Mount Gould 2007
Party	Candidate	Votes	%
Labour	Jean Nelder	1,292	42.8%
Conservative	Edmund Shillabeer	826	27.4%
Liberal Democrats	Peter York	577	19.1%
Green	Louise Parker	323	10.7%
Majority		466	15.4%
Turnout		3,018	32.3%
Labour hold			

== See also ==
- List of wards in Plymouth
