= 2008 Plymouth City Council election =

2008 UK local government election

← 2007	1 May 2008	2010 →

19 of the 57 seats to Plymouth City Council 29 seats needed for a majority
	First party	Second party
Party	Conservative	Labour
Last election	31	26
Seats won	14	5
Seats after	37	20
Seat change	▲6	▼6
Popular vote	28,041	16,063
Percentage	47.3%	27.1%
- Map showing the results of contested wards in the 2008 Plymouth City Council elections.
Council control before election
Conservative
Council control after election
Conservative

The 2008 Plymouth City Council election was held on 1 May 2008 to elect members of Plymouth City Council in England. One third of the council was up for election and the Conservative Party remained in control of the council with an increased majority.

== Overall results ==
2008 Plymouth City Council Election
Party	Seats	Gains	Losses	Net gain/loss	Seats %	Votes %	Votes	+/−
Conservative	14	6	0	▲6	73.7	47.3	28,041	
Labour	5	0	6	▼6	26.3	27.1	16,063	
Liberal Democrats	0	0	0	Steady	0.0	13.7	8,115	
UKIP	0	0	0	Steady	0.0	4.5	2,655	
Green	0	0	0	Steady	0.0	4.6	2,710	
Independent	0	0	0	Steady	0.0	2.0	1,173	
BNP	0	0	0	Steady	0.0	1.0	571	
Total	19						59,328	

Note: All changes in vote share are in comparison to the corresponding 2004 election.

== Ward results ==
=== Budshead ===
Location of Budshead ward

Budshead 2008
Party	Candidate	Votes	%
Conservative	Jack Thompson	1,717	53.8%
Labour	Chris Mavin	987	30.9%
Liberal Democrats	Tracy Lang	488	15.3%
Majority		730	22.9%
Turnout		3,192	33.9%
Conservative gain from Labour			

=== Compton ===
Location of Compton ward

Compton 2008
Party	Candidate	Votes	%
Conservative	Richard Ball	1,947	57.6%
Liberal Democrats	Emma Swann	478	14.1%
Labour	Ross Burns	470	13.9%
Green	Josie Bannon	252	7.5%
UKIP	Andrew Leigh	234	6.9%
Majority		1,469	43.4%
Turnout		3,381	37.5%
Conservative hold			

=== Devonport ===
Location of Devonport ward

Devonport 2008
Party	Candidate	Votes	%
Labour	Nicola Wildy	1,050	41.8%
Conservative	Betty Gray	954	38.0%
Liberal Democrats	Charles Earl	310	12.3%
Green	Colin Bannon	198	7.9%
Majority		96	3.8%
Turnout		2,512	27.0%
Labour hold			

=== Efford and Lipson ===
Location of Efford and Lipson ward

Efford and Lipson 2008
Party	Candidate	Votes	%
Labour	Brian Vincent	1,366	44.5%
Conservative	Mary Orchard	1,055	34.3%
Liberal Democrats	Simon Hayes	387	12.6%
Green	Colin Trier	265	8.6%
Majority		311	10.1%
Turnout		3,073	32.2%
Labour hold			

=== Eggbuckland ===
Location of Eggbuckland ward

Eggbuckland 2008
Party	Candidate	Votes	%
Conservative	Peter Brookshaw	1,828	47.2%
Labour	John Smith	861	22.2%
Independent	Lee Finn	682	17.6%
Liberal Democrats	Laura Walker	333	8.6%
Green	Raymond Delamare	170	4.4%
Majority		967	25.0%
Turnout		3,874	37.9%
Conservative hold			

=== Ham ===
Location of Ham ward

Ham 2008
Party	Candidate	Votes	%
Labour	Christopher Pattison	1,207	41.3%
Conservative	Frederick Brimacombe	1,158	39.6%
Liberal Democrats	Stephen Goldthorpe	387	13.2%
Green	Andrew Pratt	173	5.9%
Majority		49	1.7%
Turnout		2,925	30.3%
Labour hold			

=== Honicknowle ===
Location of Honicknowle ward

Honicknowle 2008
Party	Candidate	Votes	%
Labour	Peter Smith	1,135	41.4%
Conservative	Paul Rielly	935	34.1%
Liberal Democrats	Gillian Hirst	433	15.8%
Green	Nicholas Byrne	241	8.8%
Majority		200	7.3%
Turnout		2,744	26.9%
Labour hold			

=== Moor View ===
Location of Moor View ward

Moor View 2008
Party	Candidate	Votes	%
Conservative	Edward Delbridge	1,453	43.7%
Labour	Paul Hutchings	1,153	34.7%
Liberal Democrats	David Jolly	311	9.4%
UKIP	Richard Barrett	297	8.9%
Green	Nicola Bannon	111	3.3%
Majority		300	9.0%
Turnout		3,325	35.8%
Conservative gain from Labour			

=== Peverell ===
Location of Peverell ward

Peverell 2008
Party	Candidate	Votes	%
Conservative	Patricia Nicholson	2,036	55.1%
Labour	John Sewell	626	17.0%
Green	Don Allen	521	14.1%
Liberal Democrats	Deborah Earl	510	13.8%
Majority		1,410	38.2%
Turnout		3,693	36.9%
Labour hold			

=== Plympton Chaddlewood ===
Location of Plympton Chaddlewood ward

Plympton Chaddlewood 2008
Party	Candidate	Votes	%
Conservative	David Salter	1,133	60.0%
Labour	Pauline Murphy	300	15.9%
UKIP	Jonathan Frost	233	12.3%
Liberal Democrats	Steve Barton	223	11.8%
Majority		833	44.1%
Turnout		1,889	33.8%
Conservative hold			

=== Plympton Erle ===
Location of Plympton Erle ward

Plympton Erle 2008
Party	Candidate	Votes	%
Conservative	John Lock	1,499	60.4%
Labour	Valerie Burns	391	15.8%
Liberal Democrats	Wesley Rowe	347	14.0%
UKIP	John Roberts	243	9.8%
Majority		1,108	44.7%
Turnout		2,480	36.2%
Conservative hold			

Note: This Plympton Erle seat was won by Lock for the Liberal Democrats the previous time it was contested in 2004, but he defected to the Conservatives in 2007.

=== Plympton St Mary ===
Location of Plympton St Mary ward

Plympton St Mary 2008
Party	Candidate	Votes	%
Conservative	Samantha Leaves	2,283	61.3%
Labour	Darren Jones	461	12.4%
Liberal Democrats	Liz Barton	385	10.3%
Independent	James Sanderson	304	8.2%
UKIP	Hugh Williams	291	7.8%
Majority		1,822	48.9%
Turnout		3,724	37.3%
Conservative hold			

=== Plymstock Dunstone ===
Location of Plymstock Dunstone ward

Plymstock Dunstone 2008
Party	Candidate	Votes	%
Conservative	Kevin Wigens	2,300	59.2%
Liberal Democrats	Stephen Kearney	636	16.4%
Labour	Mike Fox	477	12.3%
UKIP	Alan Skuse	417	10.7%
Independent	Bruce Abbott	53	1.4%
Majority		1,664	42.9%
Turnout		3,883	39.8%
Conservative hold			

=== Plymstock Radford ===
Location of Plymstock Radford ward

Plymstock Radford 2008
Party	Candidate	Votes	%
Conservative	Michael Leaves	1,962	54.5%
Labour	Julia Olsen	686	19.0%
UKIP	Roger Bullock	508	14.1%
Liberal Democrats	Steven Lemin	447	12.4%
Majority		1,276	35.4%
Turnout		3,603	37.3%
Conservative hold			

=== St Budeaux ===
Location of St Budeaux ward

St Budeaux 2008
Party	Candidate	Votes	%
Conservative	Gloria Bragg	1,003	36.5%
Labour	Margaret Storer	983	35.7%
Liberal Democrats	Ray McSweeney	559	20.3%
Green	Roger Creagh-Osborne	205	7.5%
Majority		20	0.7%
Turnout		2,750	28.7%
Conservative gain from Labour			

=== St Peter and the Waterfront ===
Location of St Peter and the Waterfront ward

St Peter and the Waterfront 2008
Party	Candidate	Votes	%
Conservative	Sally Stephens	1,064	36.6%
Labour	Valentine Hiromeris	995	34.2%
Liberal Democrats	Christina MacCullie	264	9.1%
BNP	Michael Antonucci	233	8.0%
UKIP	Sean O'Kane	216	7.4%
Independent	Jo Jo	134	4.6%
Majority		69	2.4%
Turnout		2,906	30.7%
Conservative gain from Labour			

=== Southway ===
Location of Southway ward

Southway 2008
Party	Candidate	Votes	%
Conservative	Peter Berrow	1,318	38.8%
Labour	David Weekes	1,155	34.0%
Liberal Democrats	Jane Barwick	583	17.2%
BNP	Lawrence Miller	338	10.0%
Majority		163	4.8%
Turnout		3,394	%
Conservative gain from Labour			

=== Stoke ===
Location of Stoke ward

Stoke 2008
Party	Candidate	Votes	%
Conservative	David Reynolds	1,500	46.3%
Labour	David Haydon	1,014	31.3%
Liberal Democrats	Kirsty Barwick	382	11.8%
Green	Wendy Miller	347	10.7%
Majority		486	15.0%
Turnout		3,243	34.8%
Conservative gain from Labour			

=== Sutton and Mount Gould ===
Location of Sutton and Mount Gould ward

Sutton and Mount Gould 2008
Party	Candidate	Votes	%
Labour	Edwin Rennie	985	36.0%
Conservative	Edmund Shillabeer	896	32.7%
Liberal Democrats	Peter York	413	15.1%
Green	Tean Mitchell	227	8.3%
UKIP	Jonquil Webber	216	7.9%
Majority		89	3.3%
Turnout		2,737	28.2%
Labour hold			

== See also ==
- List of wards in Plymouth
