= 2000 Plymouth City Council election =

2000 UK local government election

← 1997	4 May 2000	2003 →

All 60 seats in the Plymouth City Council 31 seats needed for a majority
	First party	Second party
Party	Conservative	Labour
Last election	13 seats, 32.8%	47 seats, 47.2%
Seats won	38	22
Seat change	▲26	▼26
Popular vote	29,644	22,115
Percentage	48.1%	32.8%
Swing	▲15.3%	▼14.4%
- Map showing the results of the 2000 Plymouth City Council elections.
Council control before election
Labour
Council control after election
Conservative

The 2000 Plymouth City Council election was held on 4 May 2000 to elect members of Plymouth City Council in England. This was on the same day as the other local elections. The entire council was up for election and the Conservative Party gained control of the council from the Labour Party.

== Overall results ==
2000 Plymouth City Council Election
Party	Seats	Gains	Losses	Net gain/loss	Seats %	Votes %	Votes	+/−
Conservative	38	26	0	▲26	65.0	48.1	29,644	▲15.3
Labour	22	0	26	▼26	35.0	35.9	22,115	▼12.2
Liberal Democrats	0	0	0	Steady	0.0	14.6	8,992	▼2.7
Independent	0	0	0	Steady	0.0	0.2	128	▼0.9
Green	0	0	0	Steady	0.0	0.5	308	▼0.3
Liberal	0	0	0	Steady	0.0	0.5	313	New
Independent Democrat	0	0	0	Steady	0.0	0.2	143	▼0.5
Total	60						61,643	

== Ward results ==
=== Budshead (3 seats) ===
Location of Budshead ward

Budshead (3 seats)
Party	Candidate	Votes	%
Labour	Ronald Simmonds	1,134	
Labour	Paul Carter	1,105	
Labour	Thomas Coleman	1,079	
Conservative	N. Milne	708	
Conservative	J. White	678	
Conservative	E. Wright	645	
Liberal Democrats	S. Simmonds	357	
Turnout			24.7%
Labour hold			
Labour hold			
Labour hold			

=== Compton (3 seats) ===
Location of Compton ward

Compton (3 seats)
Party	Candidate	Votes	%
Conservative	Albert Fry	1,910	
Conservative	David Stark	1,887	
Conservative	Thomas Savery	1,886	
Labour	M. Dax	646	
Labour	S. Orgill	634	
Labour	K. French	586	
Liberal Democrats	C. Richardson	466	
Liberal Democrats	R. Casley	442	
Liberal Democrats	M. Barriball	439	
Turnout			35.5%
Conservative hold			
Conservative hold			
Conservative hold			

=== Drake (3 seats) ===
Location of Drake ward

Drake (3 seats)
Party	Candidate	Votes	%
Conservative	Karen Gillard	1,190	
Conservative	Colin Miles	1,151	
Conservative	Patrick Marshall	1,123	
Liberal Democrats	R. Bray	1,049	
Liberal Democrats	S. Luscombe	989	
Liberal Democrats	R. Egerton	974	
Labour	V. Hiromeris	939	
Labour	C. Childs	907	
Labour	G. Pettet	903	
Turnout			29.5%
Conservative gain from Labour			
Conservative gain from Labour			
Conservative gain from Labour			

=== Efford (3 seats) ===
Location of Efford ward

Efford (3 seats)
Party	Candidate	Votes	%
Conservative	Michael Leaves	1,353	
Labour	Bernard Miller	1,313	
Conservative	Mary Orchard	1,310	
Labour	Jane Margaret Jones	1,301	
Labour	Brian Vincent	1,278	
Conservative	P. Rickard	1,192	
Liberal	R. Vosper	326	
Liberal Democrats	C. Curry	313	
Turnout			33.1%
Conservative gain from Labour			
Labour hold			
Conservative gain from Labour			

=== Eggbuckland (3 seats) ===
Location of Eggbuckland ward

Eggbuckland (3 seats)
Party	Candidate	Votes	%
Conservative	Gloria Bragg	1,894	
Conservative	Michael Foster	1,845	
Conservative	Paul Rowe	1,788	
Labour	Derick Brian Bray	1,605	
Labour	Michael George Wright	1,522	
Labour	M. Robinson	1,462	
Liberal Democrats	R. Bellamy	496	
Turnout			36.5%
Conservative gain from Labour			
Conservative gain from Labour			
Conservative gain from Labour			

=== Estover (3 seats) ===
Location of Estover ward

Estover (3 seats)
Party	Candidate	Votes	%
Conservative	Peter Brookshaw	2,419	
Conservative	Heather Ellis	2,395	
Conservative	Alexandra Sloggett	2,254	
Labour	L. Fone	1,322	
Labour	Michael Robert Fox	1,294	
Labour	P. Harvey	1,164	
Liberal Democrats	S. Hutty	500	
Turnout			33.4%
Conservative gain from Labour			
Conservative gain from Labour			
Conservative gain from Labour			

=== Ham (3 seats) ===
Location of Ham ward

Ham (3 seats)
Party	Candidate	Votes	%
Labour	Tudor Evans	1,150	
Labour	Ian Gordon	1,066	
Labour	Christopher Pattison	1,034	
Conservative	D. Corry	738	
Conservative	R. McSweeney	698	
Conservative	M. White	638	
Liberal Democrats	M. Luscombe	268	
Independent Democrat	P. Stanner	143	
Turnout			27.5%
Labour hold			
Labour hold			
Labour hold			

=== Honicknowle (3 seats) ===
Location of Honicknowle ward

Honicknowle (3 seats)
Party	Candidate	Votes	%
Labour	Alan Ford	1,306	
Labour	Pauline Purnell	1,206	
Labour	Peter Smith	1,174	
Conservative	K. Foster	915	
Conservative	J. Wallace	894	
Conservative	R. Mahony	881	
Liberal Democrats	M. Bellamy	389	
Turnout			27.0%
Labour hold			
Labour hold			
Labour hold			

=== Keyham (3 seats) ===
Location of Keyham ward

Keyham (3 seats)
Party	Candidate	Votes	%
Labour	Howard Davey	1,000	
Labour	Steven Lemin	981	
Conservative	James Bell	915	
Labour	A. Stephens	904	
Conservative	D. Hooper	903	
Conservative	J. Ellis	812	
Liberal Democrats	M. Gallagher	335	
Turnout			26.7%
Labour hold			
Labour hold			
Conservative gain from Labour			

=== Mount Gould (3 seats) ===
Location of Mount Gould ward

Mount Gould (3 seats)
Party	Candidate	Votes	%
Conservative	Glenn Jordan	867	
Conservative	S. Bennett	836	
Labour	A. Hughes	808	
Conservative	J. Pritchard	805	
Labour	John Gerard Williams	793	
Labour	Edwin Shaun Rennie	754	
Liberal Democrats	A. Egerton	482	
Liberal Democrats	G. Nye	456	
Liberal Democrats	P. York	449	
Independent	C. Brown	128	
Turnout			28.0%
Conservative gain from Labour			
Conservative gain from Labour			
Labour hold			

=== Plympton Erle (3 seats) ===
Location of Plympton Erle ward

Plympton Erle (3 seats)
Party	Candidate	Votes	%
Conservative	Kathleen Banks	2,400	
Conservative	John Fox	2,332	
Conservative	David James	2,299	
Labour	S. Dann	815	
Labour	M. Hughes	679	
Liberal Democrats	K. Hill	667	
Labour	A. Mason	658	
Liberal Democrats	S. Jennett	504	
Liberal Democrats	J. Seed	407	
Turnout			28.2%
Conservative hold			
Conservative hold			
Conservative hold			

=== Plympton St Mary (3 seats) ===
Location of Plympton St Mary ward

Plympton St Mary (3 seats)
Party	Candidate	Votes	%
Conservative	Patrick Nicholson	2,086	
Conservative	Delia Ford	2,011	
Conservative	Maureen Lawley	1,728	
Labour	E. O'Hara	733	
Labour	F. Sheaff	606	
Labour	W. Wraight	566	
Liberal Democrats	A. Cains	290	
Liberal Democrats	V. Baharie	267	
Turnout			36.2%
Conservative hold			
Conservative hold			
Conservative hold			

=== Plymstock Dunstone (3 seats) ===
Location of Plymstock Dunstone ward

Plymstock Dunstone (3 seats)
Party	Candidate	Votes	%
Conservative	David Viney	2,885	
Conservative	Vivien Pengelly	2,793	
Conservative	Kevin Wigens	2,669	
Labour	J. Kirk	1,032	
Labour	V. Burns	860	
Labour	L. Stacey	810	
Liberal Democrats	J. Coker	517	
Liberal Democrats	P. Durrant	495	
Liberal Democrats	C. Burrows	434	
Turnout			39.9%
Conservative hold			
Conservative hold			
Conservative hold			

=== Plymstock Radford (3 seats) ===
Location of Plymstock Radford ward

Plymstock Radford (3 seats)
Party	Candidate	Votes	%
Conservative	Kenneth Foster	1,907	
Conservative	Wendy Foster	1,872	
Conservative	Michael Leaves	1,786	
Labour	R. Earl	1,116	
Labour	P. Allan	908	
Labour	J. Clynch	883	
Liberal Democrats	J. Byatt	696	
Liberal Democrats	M. Coker	621	
Liberal Democrats	A. Nelmes	592	
Turnout			40.9%
Conservative hold			
Conservative gain from Labour			
Conservative gain from Labour			

=== Southway (3 seats) ===
Location of Southway ward

Southway (3 seats)
Party	Candidate	Votes	%
Labour	Dennis Camp	1,446	
Conservative	Janice Harden	1,399	
Conservative	Graham Horler	1,318	
Labour	A. Bull	1,306	
Conservative	E. Willey	1,288	
Labour	John George Jones	1,286	
Liberal Democrats	M. Trench	315	
Turnout			30.8%
Labour hold			
Conservative gain from Labour			
Conservative gain from Labour			

=== St Budeax (3 seats) ===
Location of St Budeax ward

St Budeax (3 seats)
Party	Candidate	Votes	%
Labour	Brenda Jones	1,218	
Labour	Carol Blackburn	1,181	
Labour	Thomas Wildy	1,074	
Conservative	J. Plymsol	1,002	
Conservative	E. Price	948	
Conservative	M. Gibson	925	
Liberal Democrats	W. Gallagher	384	
Turnout			28.0%
Labour hold			
Labour hold			
Labour hold			

=== St Peter (3 seats) ===
Location of St Peter ward

x

St Peter (3 seats)
Party	Candidate	Votes	%
Labour	Sylvia Bellamy	1,062	
Labour	Robert Bellamy	994	
Labour	Mark King	985	
Conservative	J. Parry	651	
Conservative	D. Gamble	646	
Conservative	P. Parnall	637	
Liberal Democrats	H. Guy	280	
Liberal Democrats	P. Jones	277	
Turnout			24.8%
Labour hold			
Labour hold			
Labour hold			

=== Stoke (3 seats) ===
Location of Stoke ward

Stoke (3 seats)
Party	Candidate	Votes	%
Conservative	Constance Pascoe	1,584	
Conservative	Yvonne Dawson	1,556	
Conservative	Grant Monahan	1,481	
Labour	David Alexander Millar	1,237	
Labour	Janet Millar	1,182	
Labour	William John Stevens	1,172	
Liberal Democrats	S. Guy	447	
Liberal Democrats	J. Evans	422	
Turnout			35.3%
Conservative gain from Labour			
Conservative gain from Labour			
Conservative gain from Labour			

=== Sutton (3 seats) ===
Location of Sutton ward

Sutton (3 seats)
Party	Candidate	Votes	%
Conservative	Frederick Brimacombe	1,188	
Conservative	Anna Angel	1,101	
Labour	Jean Nelder	1,095	
Conservative	K. Kelway	1,071	
Labour	E. Cohen	1,031	
Labour	G. Wheeler	1,008	
Liberal Democrats	J. Dean	320	
Turnout			29.5%
Conservative gain from Labour			
Conservative gain from Labour			
Labour hold			

=== Trelawny (3 seats) ===
Location of Trelawny ward

Trelawny (3 seats)
Party	Candidate	Votes	%
Conservative	John Mahony	1,633	
Conservative	Patricia Nicholson	1,620	
Conservative	David Birkenhead	1,565	
Labour	R. Rogers	1,138	
Labour	G. Shears	1,113	
Labour	V. Woodward	1,093	
Liberal Democrats	P. Aldersley	408	
Green	F. Allen	308	
Turnout			42.5%
Conservative gain from Labour			
Conservative gain from Labour			
Conservative gain from Labour			
