= 2004 Plymouth City Council election =

2004 UK local government election

| ← 2003 | 10 June 2004 | 2006 → |

19 of the 57 seats to Plymouth City Council 29 seats needed for a majority
| | First party | Second party | Third party |
|---|---|---|---|
| Party | Labour | Conservative | Liberal Democrats |
| Last election | 36 | 18 | 3 |
| Seats won | 11 | 7 | 1 |
| Seats after | 35 | 19 | 3 |
| Seat change | ▼1 | ▲1 | Steady |
| Popular vote | 20,511 | 20,261 | 11,862 |
| Percentage | 32.1% | 31.7% | 18.6% |
- Map showing the results of contested wards in the 2004 Plymouth City Council elections.
Council control before election
Labour
Council control after election
Labour

The 2004 Plymouth City Council election was held on 10 June 2004 to elect members of Plymouth City Council in England. This was on the same day as the other local elections. One third of the council was up for election and the Labour Party remained in control of the council.

== Overall results ==
2004 Plymouth City Council Election
| Party | Seats | Gains | Losses | Net gain/loss | Seats % | Votes % | Votes | +/− |
|---|---|---|---|---|---|---|---|---|
| Labour | 11 | 0 | 1 | ▼1 | 57.9 | 32.1 | 20,511 | |
| Conservative | 7 | 1 | 0 | ▲1 | 36.8 | 31.7 | 20,261 | |
| Liberal Democrats | 1 | 0 | 0 | Steady | 0.0 | 18.6 | 11,862 | |
| UKIP | 0 | 0 | 0 | Steady | 0.0 | 13.9 | 8,853 | |
| Green | 0 | 0 | 0 | Steady | 0.0 | 1.8 | 1,171 | |
| Independent | 0 | 0 | 0 | Steady | 0.0 | 1.2 | 796 | |
| BNP | 0 | 0 | 0 | Steady | 0.0 | 0.6 | 379 | |
| Total | 19 | | | | | | 63,833 | |

== Ward results ==
=== Budshead ===
Location of Budshead ward

Budshead 2004
| Party | Candidate | Votes | % |
|---|---|---|---|
| Labour | Christopher Mavin | 1,168 | 34.8% |
| Conservative | Matthew Harrison | 1,007 | 30.0% |
| UKIP | Thomas Williams | 702 | 20.9% |
| Liberal Democrats | Trevor Addis | 478 | 14.2% |
| Turnout | | 3,355 | 34.9% |
| Labour hold | | | |

=== Compton ===
Location of Compton ward

Compton 2004
| Party | Candidate | Votes | % |
|---|---|---|---|
| Conservative | Thomas Savery | 1,519 | 40.9% |
| Liberal Democrats | Ronald Casley | 855 | 23.0% |
| Labour | Debra Roche | 757 | 20.4% |
| UKIP | Ronald Coombes | 581 | 15.7% |
| Turnout | | 3,712 | 40.5% |
| Conservative hold | | | |

=== Devonport ===
Location of Devonport ward

Devonport 2004
| Party | Candidate | Votes | % |
|---|---|---|---|
| Labour | Nicola Wildy | 1,068 | 37.1% |
| Conservative | James Bell | 630 | 21.9% |
| UKIP | Sydney Brooks | 465 | 16.2% |
| Liberal Democrats | John Brooks | 429 | 14.9% |
| BNP | Graham Green | 191 | 6.6% |
| Green | Wendy Miller | 93 | 3.2% |
| Turnout | | 2,876 | 29.3% |
| Labour hold | | | |

=== Efford and Lipson ===
Location of Efford and Lipson ward

Efford and Lipson 2004
| Party | Candidate | Votes | % |
|---|---|---|---|
| Labour | Brian Vincent | 1,649 | 50.1% |
| Liberal Democrats | Lilli Miller | 843 | 25.6% |
| Conservative | Mary Orchard | 802 | 24.3% |
| Turnout | | 3,294 | 34.4% |
| Labour hold | | | |

=== Eggbuckland ===
Location of Eggbuckland ward

Eggbuckland 2004
| Party | Candidate | Votes | % |
|---|---|---|---|
| Conservative | Peter Brookshaw | 1,190 | 30.9% |
| Labour | Steven Lemin | 1,189 | 30.8% |
| UKIP | Denis McCallum | 669 | 17.4% |
| Liberal Democrats | Richard Fells | 480 | 12.5% |
| Independent | Paul Rowe | 327 | 8.5% |
| Turnout | | 3,855 | 38.6% |
| Conservative gain from Labour | | | |

=== Ham ===
Location of Ham ward

Ham 2004
| Party | Candidate | Votes | % |
|---|---|---|---|
| Labour | Christopher Pattison | 1,379 | 43.7% |
| UKIP | Anita Truman | 666 | 21.1% |
| Conservative | Timothy Thomas | 642 | 20.3% |
| Liberal Democrats | Kenneth Black | 471 | 14.9% |
| Turnout | | 3,158 | 32.4% |
| Labour hold | | | |

=== Honicknowle ===
Location of Honicknowle ward

Honicknowle 2004
| Party | Candidate | Votes | % |
|---|---|---|---|
| Labour | Peter Smith | 1,604 | 53.3% |
| Conservative | Gloria Bragg | 703 | 23.4% |
| Liberal Democrats | Tara Smith | 700 | 23.3% |
| Turnout | | 3,007 | 29.8% |
| Labour hold | | | |

=== Moor View ===
Location of Moor View ward

Moor View 2004
| Party | Candidate | Votes | % |
|---|---|---|---|
| Labour | Paul Hutchings | 1,344 | 40.3% |
| Conservative | Brenda Brookshaw | 1,074 | 32.2% |
| Liberal Democrats | Andrew Campbell | 921 | 27.6% |
| Turnout | | 3,339 | 35.4% |
| Labour hold | | | |

=== Peverell ===
Location of Peverell ward

Peverell 2004
| Party | Candidate | Votes | % |
|---|---|---|---|
| Conservative | Patricia Nicholson | 1,494 | 35.6% |
| Labour | Michael Robinson | 996 | 23.7% |
| Liberal Democrats | Emma Swann | 812 | 19.4% |
| UKIP | Carole Bragg | 613 | 14.6% |
| Green | Frederick Allen | 279 | 6.7% |
| Turnout | | 4,194 | 42.8% |
| Labour hold | | | |

=== Plympton Chaddlewood ===
Location of Plympton Chaddlewood ward

Plympton Chaddlewood 2004
| Party | Candidate | Votes | % |
|---|---|---|---|
| Conservative | David Salter | 795 | 40.0% |
| Liberal Democrats | Jonathan Byatt | 385 | 19.4% |
| Labour | Valerie Burns | 362 | 18.2% |
| UKIP | Jeremy Hill | 338 | 17.0% |
| Independent | David Every | 107 | 5.4% |
| Turnout | | 1,987 | 32.5% |
| Conservative hold | | | |

=== Plympton Erle ===
Location of Plympton Erle ward

Plympton Erle 2004
| Party | Candidate | Votes | % |
|---|---|---|---|
| Liberal Democrats | Ernest Lock | 994 | 34.7% |
| Conservative | Michael Foster | 840 | 29.3% |
| UKIP | Alan Skuse | 547 | 19.1% |
| Labour | Ross Burns | 484 | 16.9% |
| Turnout | | 2,865 | 41.4% |
| Liberal Democrats hold | | | |

=== Plympton St Mary ===
Location of Plympton St Mary ward

Plympton St Mary 2004
| Party | Candidate | Votes | % |
|---|---|---|---|
| Conservative | Delia Ford | 1,659 | 40.8% |
| UKIP | James Sanderson | 1,030 | 25.3% |
| Labour | Juliet Henley | 783 | 19.2% |
| Liberal Democrats | Stephen Kendrick | 598 | 14.7% |
| Turnout | | 4,070 | 42.2% |
| Conservative hold | | | |

=== Plymstock Dunstone ===
Location of Plymstock Dunstone ward

Plymstock Dunstone 2004
| Party | Candidate | Votes | % |
|---|---|---|---|
| Conservative | Kevin Wigens | 1,961 | 46.8% |
| UKIP | Stephen Winter | 935 | 22.3% |
| Labour | Christopher Childs | 715 | 17.1% |
| Liberal Democrats | Justin Robbins | 579 | 13.8% |
| Turnout | | 4,190 | 42.6% |
| Conservative hold | | | |

=== Plymstock Radford ===
Location of Plymstock Radford ward

Plymstock Radford 2004
| Party | Candidate | Votes | % |
|---|---|---|---|
| Conservative | Michael Leaves | 1,673 | 41.4% |
| UKIP | Roger Bullock | 862 | 21.3% |
| Labour | Stephen Barker | 773 | 19.1% |
| Liberal Democrats | Muriel Hawton | 546 | 13.5% |
| BNP | Anthony Devereux | 188 | 4.7% |
| Turnout | | 4,042 | 43.6% |
| Conservative hold | | | |

=== St Budeaux ===
Location of St Budeaux ward

St Budeaux 2004
| Party | Candidate | Votes | % |
|---|---|---|---|
| Labour | Dafydd Williams | 1,149 | 39.3% |
| UKIP | Roger Benton | 792 | 27.1% |
| Conservative | Janet Plymsol | 557 | 19.1% |
| Liberal Democrats | Raymond McSweeney | 424 | 14.5% |
| Turnout | | 2,922 | 30.4% |
| Labour hold | | | |

=== St Peter and the Waterfront ===
Location of St Peter and the Waterfront ward

St Peter and the Waterfront 2004
| Party | Candidate | Votes | % |
|---|---|---|---|
| Labour | Valentine Hiromeris | 1,010 | 33.9% |
| Conservative | Frederick Brimacombe | 857 | 28.8% |
| Liberal Democrats | Christina MacCullie | 548 | 18.4% |
| Independent | Raymond Rees | 206 | 6.9% |
| Green | Frank Williamson | 201 | 6.7% |
| Independent | Jo Jo | 156 | 5.2% |
| Turnout | | 2,978 | 30.9% |
| Labour hold | | | |

=== Southway ===
Location of Southway ward

Southway 2004
| Party | Candidate | Votes | % |
|---|---|---|---|
| Labour | David Weekes | 1,578 | 45.6% |
| Conservative | Michael Gibson | 1,222 | 35.3% |
| Liberal Democrats | Terrance O'Connor | 662 | 19.1% |
| Turnout | | 3,462 | 37.1% |
| Labour hold | | | |

=== Stoke ===
Location of Stoke ward

Stoke 2004
| Party | Candidate | Votes | % |
|---|---|---|---|
| Labour | David Haydon | 1,259 | 35.4% |
| Conservative | Grant Monaghan | 915 | 25.7% |
| UKIP | Robert Saxton | 653 | 18.3% |
| Liberal Democrats | John Davey | 504 | 14.2% |
| Green | Jane Cavanagh | 230 | 6.5% |
| Turnout | | 3,561 | 36.9% |
| Labour hold | | | |

=== Sutton and Mount Gould ===
Location of Sutton and Mount Gould ward

Sutton and Mount Gould 2004
| Party | Candidate | Votes | % |
|---|---|---|---|
| Labour | Edwin Rennie | 1,244 | 41.9% |
| Conservative | Edmund Shillabeer | 721 | 24.3% |
| Liberal Democrats | Peter York | 633 | 21.3% |
| Green | Tean Mitchell | 368 | 12.4% |
| Turnout | | 2,966 | 31.1% |
| Labour hold | | | |
