= 2006 Plymouth City Council election =

2006 UK local government election

← 2004	4 May 2006	2007 →

19 of the 57 seats to Plymouth City Council 29 seats needed for a majority
	First party	Second party	Third party
Party	Labour	Conservative	Liberal Democrats
Last election	35	19	2
Seats before	32	19	4
Seats won	7	12	1
Seats after	28	25	3
Seat change	▼4	▲6	▼1
Popular vote	16,988	24,088	11,864
Percentage	27.9%	39.6%	19.5%
- Map showing the results of contested wards in the 2006 Plymouth City Council elections.
Council control before election
Labour
Council control after election
No overall control

The 2006 Plymouth City Council election was held on 4 May 2006 to elect members of Plymouth City Council in England. One third of the council was up for election on the day, with an additional seat in Southway Ward remaining vacant until a by-election on 22 June. After the election, Labour were reduced to 28 out of the 56 filled seats, thus temporarily losing control of the council to No Overall Control. However, Labour won the Southway by-election on 22 June, thus restoring their overall control of the council.

== Overall results ==
2006 Plymouth City Council Election
Party	Seats	Gains	Losses	Net gain/loss	Seats %	Votes %	Votes	+/−
Conservative	12	6	0	▲6	63.2	39.6	24,088	
Labour	7	0	5	▼5	36.8	27.9	16,988	
Liberal Democrats	0	0	1	▼1	0.0	19.5	11,864	
UKIP	0	0	0	Steady	0.0	6.3	3,835	
Green	0	0	0	Steady	0.0	4.0	2,422	
Independent	0	0	0	Steady	0.0	2.5	1,495	
Respect	0	0	0	Steady	0.0	0.2	112	
Total	19						60,804	

== Ward results ==
=== Budshead ===
Location of Budshead ward

Budshead 2006
Party	Candidate	Votes	%
Conservative	Grant Monahan	1,260	37.8%
Labour	Bill Coleman	1,052	31.5%
Liberal Democrats	Janet Crocker	541	16.2%
UKIP	Carole Bragg	483	14.5%
Majority		208	6.2%
Turnout		3,336	35.7%
Conservative gain from Labour			

=== Compton ===
Location of Compton ward

Compton 2006
Party	Candidate	Votes	%
Conservative	Ted Fry	1,830	51.3%
Liberal Democrats	Steven Smith	840	23.6%
Labour	Thomas Taylor	549	15.4%
Green	Nicola Bannon	345	9.7%
Majority		990	27.8%
Turnout		3,564	38.5%
Conservative hold			

=== Devonport ===
Location of Devonport ward

Devonport 2006
Party	Candidate	Votes	%
Labour	William Stevens	968	34.5%
Conservative	Jim Bell	802	28.6%
Liberal Democrats	Matthew Radmore	396	14.1%
Independent	William Goffin	363	12.9%
Green	Wendy Miller	163	5.8%
Respect	Andrew Symons	112	4.0%
Majority		166	5.9%
Turnout		2,804	29.3%
Labour hold			

=== Drake ===
Location of Drake ward

Drake 2006
Party	Candidate	Votes	%
Conservative	Steven Ricketts	488	30.4%
Liberal Democrats	Christina MacCullie	361	22.5%
Labour	Mark Coker	323	20.1%
Independent	David Santillo	317	19.8%
Green	Colin Bannon	116	7.2%
Majority		127	7.9%
Turnout		1,605	26.5%
Conservative gain from Liberal Democrats			

=== Efford and Lipson ===
Location of Efford and Lipson ward

Efford and Lipson 2006
Party	Candidate	Votes	%
Labour	Andrew Kerswell	1,149	37.9%
Conservative	Mary Orchard	885	29.2%
Liberal Democrats	Lilli Miller	715	23.6%
Green	Tean Mitchell	284	9.4%
Majority		264	8.7%
Turnout		3,033	31.8%
Labour hold			

=== Eggbuckland ===
Location of Eggbuckland ward

Eggbuckland 2006
Party	Candidate	Votes	%
Conservative	Ian Bowyer	1,624	39.8%
Liberal Democrats	Lee Finn	1,037	25.4%
Labour	Debbie Roche	921	22.6%
UKIP	Malcolm Hipwell	355	8.7%
Green	Colin Trier	139	3.4%
Majority		587	14.4%
Turnout		4,076	41.1%
Conservative gain from Labour			

=== Ham ===
Location of Ham ward

Ham 2006
Party	Candidate	Votes	%
Labour	Ian Gordon	1,233	39.5%
Conservative	Lynda Bowyer	753	24.2%
Liberal Democrats	Stephen Goldthorp	498	16.0%
UKIP	Julia Langmaid	479	15.4%
Green	Melanie Roach	155	5.0%
Majority		480	15.4%
Turnout		3,118	32.4%
Labour hold			

=== Honicknowle ===
Location of Honicknowle ward

Honicknowle 2006
Party	Candidate	Votes	%
Labour	Pauline Purnell	1,191	38.7%
Conservative	Eileen Willey	666	21.7%
UKIP	Michael Parr	626	20.4%
Liberal Democrats	Gillian Hirst	593	19.3%
Majority		525	17.1%
Turnout		3,076	31.0%
Labour hold			

=== Moor View ===
Location of Moor View ward

Moor View 2006
Party	Candidate	Votes	%
Conservative	Michael Foster	1,320	40.3%
Labour	Michael Fox	1,214	37.1%
Liberal Democrats	Geoffrey Shepherdson	740	22.6%
Majority		106	3.2%
Turnout		3,274	35.3%
Conservative gain from Labour			

=== Peverell ===
Location of Peverell ward

Peverell 2006
Party	Candidate	Votes	%
Conservative	Martin Leaves	2,219	54.4%
Liberal Democrats	Deborah Earl	861	21.1%
Labour	Anthony Portman	617	15.1%
Green	Don Allen	381	9.3%
Majority		1,358	33.3%
Turnout		4,078	41.1%
Labour hold			

=== Plympton Chaddlewood ===
Location of Plympton Chaddlewood ward

Plympton Chaddlewood 2006
Party	Candidate	Votes	%
Conservative	Glenn Jordan	964	55.5%
Liberal Democrats	Robert McVicar	457	26.3%
Labour	Ross Burns	315	18.1%
Majority		507	29.2%
Turnout		1,736	28.9%
Conservative hold			

=== Plympton St Mary ===
Location of Plympton St Mary ward

Plympton St Mary 2006
Party	Candidate	Votes	%
Conservative	David James	1,862	48.0%
Liberal Democrats	Paul Rowe	928	23.9%
UKIP	James Sanderson	548	14.1%
Labour	John Sewell	538	13.9%
Majority		934	24.1%
Turnout		3,876	40.3%
Conservative hold			

=== Plymstock Dunstone ===
Location of Plymstock Dunstone ward

Plymstock Dunstone 2006
Party	Candidate	Votes	%
Conservative	Vivien Pengelly	2,434	62.7%
Labour	Simon Barrett	543	14.0%
Liberal Democrats	Steven Turner	539	13.9%
UKIP	Hugh Williams	366	9.4%
Majority		1,891	48.7%
Turnout		3,882	39.9%
Conservative hold			

=== Plymstock Radford ===
Location of Plymstock Radford ward

Plymstock Radford 2006
Party	Candidate	Votes	%
Conservative	Wendy Foster	1,801	48.0%
Labour	Roger Dodd	656	17.5%
Liberal Democrats	Justin Robbins	453	12.1%
Independent	John Davey	442	11.8%
UKIP	Alan Skuse	401	10.7%
Majority		1,145	30.5%
Turnout		3,753	39.8%
Conservative hold			

=== St Budeaux ===
Location of St Budeaux ward

St Budeaux 2006
Party	Candidate	Votes	%
Labour	Sallyanne Letcher	1,178	40.0%
Conservative	Brian Roberts	681	23.1%
UKIP	Thomas Williams	577	19.6%
Liberal Democrats	Raymond McSweeney	506	17.2%
Majority		497	16.9%
Turnout		2,942	31.7%
Labour hold			

=== St Peter and the Waterfront ===
Location of St Peter and the Waterfront ward

St Peter and the Waterfront 2006
Party	Candidate	Votes	%
Labour	Susan McDonald	1,058	37.7%
Conservative	Sally Stephens	928	33.0%
Liberal Democrats	Hugh Janes	460	16.4%
Green	Clare O'Neill	205	7.3%
Independent	Jo Jo	159	5.7%
Majority		130	4.6%
Turnout		2,810	30.8%
Labour hold			

=== Southway ===
Location of Southway ward

Southway 2006
Party	Candidate	Votes	%
Conservative	Thomas Browne	1,400	40.2%
Labour	James Kirk	1,371	39.4%
Liberal Democrats	Terrance O'Connor	712	20.4%
Majority		29	0.8%
Turnout		3,483	37.4%
Conservative gain from Labour			

=== Stoke ===
Location of Stoke ward

Stoke 2006
Party	Candidate	Votes	%
Conservative	Jill Dolan	1,358	39.0%
Labour	Mark Lowry	1,232	35.4%
Liberal Democrats	Emma Swann	552	15.9%
Green	Hannah Ross	338	9.7%
Majority		126	3.6%
Turnout		3,480	36.4%
Conservative gain from Labour			

=== Sutton and Mount Gould ===
Location of Sutton and Mount Gould ward

Sutton and Mount Gould 2006
Party	Candidate	Votes	%
Labour	Mary Aspinall	1,094	38.0%
Conservative	Edmund Shillabeer	813	28.2%
Liberal Democrats	Peter York	675	23.5%
Green	Louise Parker	296	10.3%
Majority		281	9.8%
Turnout		2,878	30.4%
Labour hold			

== See also ==
- List of wards in Plymouth
