= 2003 Plymouth City Council election =

2003 UK local government election

- 1 May 2003

All 57 seats to Plymouth City Council 29 seats needed for a majority

| | First party | Second party | Third party |
|---|---|---|---|
| Party | Labour | Conservative | Liberal Democrats |
| Last election | 22 seats, 32.8% | 38 seats, 48.1% | 0 seats, 14.6% |
| Seats won | 36 | 18 | 3 |
| Seat change | ▲14 | ▼20 | ▲3 |
| Popular vote | 24,849 | 18,421 | 10,515 |
| Percentage | 43.2% | 32.0% | 18.3% |
| Swing | ▲10.4% | ▼16.1% | ▲3.7% |
- Map showing the results of contested wards in the 2003 Plymouth City Council elections.
Council control before election
Conservative
Council control after election
Labour

The 2003 Plymouth City Council election was held on 1 May 2003 to elect members of Plymouth City Council in England. This was on the same day as the other local elections. The election was the first to be contested under new ward boundaries, and as a result the entire council was up for election. The Labour Party regained control of the council, which it had lost to the Conservative Party at the previous election in 2000.

== Overall results ==
2003 Plymouth City Council Election
| Party | Seats | Gains | Losses | Net gain/loss | Seats % | Votes % | Votes | +/− |
|---|---|---|---|---|---|---|---|---|
| Labour | 36 | | | ▲14 | 63.2 | 43.2 | 24,849 | ▲7.3 |
| Conservative | 18 | | | ▼9 | 31.6 | 32.0 | 18,421 | ▼16.1 |
| Liberal Democrats | 3 | | | ▲2 | 5.3 | 18.3 | 10,515 | ▲3.7 |
| Plymouth Party | 0 | | | Steady | 0.0 | 1.8 | 1,046 | New |
| Green | 0 | | | Steady | 0.0 | 1.7 | 976 | ▲1.2 |
| UKIP | 0 | | | Steady | 0.0 | 1.3 | 753 | New |
| Independent | 0 | | | Steady | 0.0 | 1.1 | 659 | ▲0.9 |
| BNP | 0 | | | Steady | 0.0 | 0.3 | 192 | New |
| Socialist Alliance (England) | 0 | | | Steady | 0.0 | 0.2 | 143 | New |
| Total | 57 | | | | | | 57,303 | |

== Ward results ==
=== Budshead ===
Location of Budshead ward

Budshead 2003
| Party | Candidate | Votes | % |
|---|---|---|---|
| Labour | R Simmonds | 1,487 | |
| Labour | T Coleman | 1,439 | |
| Labour | C Mavin | 1,408 | |
| Conservative | P Brookshaw | 1,092 | |
| Conservative | J Harden | 1,027 | |
| Conservative | G Horler | 1,011 | |
| Liberal Democrats | C Summerfield | 396 | |
| Liberal Democrats | J Fitzroy | 394 | |
| Liberal Democrats | R Dogan | 374 | |
| Turnout | | | 31.0% |
| Labour win (new seat) | | | |
| Labour win (new seat) | | | |
| Labour win (new seat) | | | |

=== Compton ===
Location of Compton ward

Compton 2003
| Party | Candidate | Votes | % |
|---|---|---|---|
| Conservative | D Stark | 1,458 | |
| Conservative | A Fry | 1,436 | |
| Conservative | T Savery | 1,413 | |
| Labour | S Barker | 858 | |
| Labour | S Oxenham | 825 | |
| Labour | C Rennie | 821 | |
| Liberal Democrats | R Fells | 720 | |
| Liberal Democrats | M Walker | 712 | |
| Liberal Democrats | R Casley | 710 | |
| Turnout | | | 32.9% |
| Conservative win (new seat) | | | |
| Conservative win (new seat) | | | |
| Conservative win (new seat) | | | |

=== Devonport ===
Location of Devonport ward

Devonport 2003
| Party | Candidate | Votes | % |
|---|---|---|---|
| Labour | B Brotherton | 1,421 | |
| Labour | W Stevens | 1,313 | |
| Labour | N Wildy | 1,301 | |
| Conservative | J Bell | 574 | |
| Conservative | E Gray | 537 | |
| Conservative | J Johnson | 509 | |
| Liberal Democrats | C Prigmore | 290 | |
| Liberal Democrats | T Colley | 251 | |
| Liberal Democrats | C MacCullie | 248 | |
| Independent | J Brooks | 245 | |
| BNP | G Green | 192 | |
| Plymouth Party | W Luck | 178 | |
| Turnout | | | 26.1% |
| Labour win (new seat) | | | |
| Labour win (new seat) | | | |
| Labour win (new seat) | | | |

=== Drake ===
Location of Drake ward

Drake 2003
| Party | Candidate | Votes | % |
|---|---|---|---|
| Liberal Democrats | K Gillard | 580 | |
| Liberal Democrats | D Santillo | 537 | |
| Labour | R Bellamy | 380 | |
| Labour | D Howells | 361 | |
| Conservative | P Marshall | 281 | |
| Conservative | C Miles | 272 | |
| Socialist Alliance | P Heddle | 69 | |
| Turnout | | | 18.6% |
| Liberal Democrats win (new seat) | | | |
| Liberal Democrats win (new seat) | | | |

=== Efford and Lipson ===
Location of Efford and Lipson ward

Efford and Lipson 2003
| Party | Candidate | Votes | % |
|---|---|---|---|
| Labour | B Miller | 1,784 | |
| Labour | A Kerswell | 1,766 | |
| Labour | B Vincent | 1,752 | |
| Liberal Democrats | N Sewell | 634 | |
| Liberal Democrats | D Wood | 619 | |
| Conservative | M Orchard | 613 | |
| Liberal Democrats | L Burrows | 607 | |
| Conservative | R Lloyd | 583 | |
| Conservative | R McVicar | 554 | |
| Turnout | | | 31.7% |
| Labour win (new seat) | | | |
| Labour win (new seat) | | | |
| Labour win (new seat) | | | |

=== Eggbuckland ===
Location of Eggbuckland ward

Eggbuckland 2003
| Party | Candidate | Votes | % |
|---|---|---|---|
| Labour | D Bray | 1,387 | |
| Labour | L Finn | 1,323 | |
| Labour | S Lemin | 1,278 | |
| Conservative | C Nunn | 1,182 | |
| Conservative | M Foster | 1,164 | |
| Conservative | P Rowe | 1,158 | |
| Liberal Democrats | M Bellamy | 584 | |
| Liberal Democrats | R Bellamy | 560 | |
| Liberal Democrats | T Smith | 511 | |
| Turnout | | | 32.5% |
| Labour win (new seat) | | | |
| Labour win (new seat) | | | |
| Labour win (new seat) | | | |

=== Ham ===
Location of Ham ward

Ham 2003
| Party | Candidate | Votes | % |
|---|---|---|---|
| Labour | Tudor Evans | 1,912 | |
| Labour | I Gordon | 1,784 | |
| Labour | C Pattison | 1,746 | |
| Conservative | S Ashcroft | 553 | |
| Conservative | D Bothwick | 507 | |
| Conservative | T Thomas | 503 | |
| Liberal Democrats | M Black | 407 | |
| Liberal Democrats | K Black | 394 | |
| Liberal Democrats | L Pearson | 330 | |
| Plymouth Party | S Charles | 166 | |
| Turnout | | | 29.9% |
| Labour win (new seat) | | | |
| Labour win (new seat) | | | |
| Labour win (new seat) | | | |

=== Honicknowle ===
Location of Honicknowle ward

Honicknowle 2003
| Party | Candidate | Votes | % |
|---|---|---|---|
| Labour | P Carter | 1,689 | |
| Labour | P Purnell | 1,611 | |
| Labour | P Smith | 1,574 | |
| Conservative | B Baker | 520 | |
| Conservative | R Mahony | 502 | |
| Conservative | J Coope | 489 | |
| Liberal Democrats | J Crocker | 422 | |
| Liberal Democrats | M O'Neil | 374 | |
| Liberal Democrats | M Swann | 362 | |
| Turnout | | | 25.6% |
| Labour win (new seat) | | | |
| Labour win (new seat) | | | |
| Labour win (new seat) | | | |

=== Moor View ===
Location of Moor View ward

Moor View 2003
| Party | Candidate | Votes | % |
|---|---|---|---|
| Labour | S Dann | 1,527 | |
| Labour | M Fox | 1,489 | |
| Labour | P Hutchings | 1,474 | |
| Conservative | H Ellis | 899 | |
| Conservative | J Ellis | 863 | |
| Conservative | A Sloggett | 829 | |
| Liberal Democrats | A Campbell | 491 | |
| Liberal Democrats | D Spreat | 408 | |
| Liberal Democrats | J Spreat | 401 | |
| Turnout | | | 30.4% |
| Labour win (new seat) | | | |
| Labour win (new seat) | | | |
| Labour win (new seat) | | | |

=== Peverell ===
Location of Peverell ward

Peverell 2003
| Party | Candidate | Votes | % |
|---|---|---|---|
| Conservative | J Mahony | 1,435 | |
| Conservative | M Leaves | 1,373 | |
| Conservative | P Nicholson | 1,354 | |
| Labour | C Woodman | 1,049 | |
| Labour | C Rose | 1,002 | |
| Labour | R Sharman | 980 | |
| Liberal Democrats | V Costain | 847 | |
| Liberal Democrats | E Swann | 792 | |
| Liberal Democrats | M Shally | 763 | |
| Green | F Allen | 322 | |
| UKIP | R Sigrist | 301 | |
| UKIP | C Bragg | 284 | |
| UKIP | P Martin-Kaye | 260 | |
| Independent | A Sherry | 85 | |
| Turnout | | | 37.8% |
| Labour win (new seat) | | | |
| Labour win (new seat) | | | |
| Labour win (new seat) | | | |

=== Plympton Chaddlewood ===
Location of Plympton Chaddlewood ward

Plympton Chaddlewood 2003
| Party | Candidate | Votes | % |
|---|---|---|---|
| Conservative | G Jordan | 601 | |
| Conservative | D Salter | 572 | |
| Liberal Democrats | J Byatt | 377 | |
| Labour | P Murphy | 352 | |
| Liberal Democrats | P Hutty | 312 | |
| Labour | J Wood | 308 | |
| Independent | D Every | 211 | |
| Turnout | | | 23.6% |
| Conservative win (new seat) | | | |
| Conservative win (new seat) | | | |

=== Plympton Erle ===
Location of Plympton Erle ward

Plympton Erle 2003
| Party | Candidate | Votes | % |
|---|---|---|---|
| Conservative | J Fox | 783 | |
| Liberal Democrats | E Lock | 764 | |
| Labour | R Burns | 713 | |
| Conservative | D Birkenhead | 697 | |
| Liberal Democrats | S Jennett | 668 | |
| Labour | M Robinson | 586 | |
| Turnout | | | 31.8% |
| Conservative win (new seat) | | | |
| Liberal Democrats win (new seat) | | | |

=== Plympton St Mary ===
Location of Plympton St Mary ward

Plympton St Mary 2003
| Party | Candidate | Votes | % |
|---|---|---|---|
| Conservative | P Nicholson | 1,848 | |
| Conservative | D James | 1,741 | |
| Conservative | D Ford | 1,661 | |
| Labour | J Henley | 998 | |
| Labour | V Burns | 955 | |
| Labour | S Robinson | 860 | |
| Liberal Democrats | P Fewings | 638 | |
| Liberal Democrats | A Cains | 583 | |
| Liberal Democrats | M Trench | 478 | |
| Turnout | | | 34.9% |
| Conservative win (new seat) | | | |
| Conservative win (new seat) | | | |
| Conservative win (new seat) | | | |

=== Plymstock Dunstone ===
Location of Plymstock Dunstone ward

Plymstock Dunstone 2003
| Party | Candidate | Votes | % |
|---|---|---|---|
| Conservative | D Viney | 1,866 | |
| Conservative | V Pengelly | 1,769 | |
| Conservative | K Wigens | 1,681 | |
| Labour | R Evans | 975 | |
| Labour | C Childs | 842 | |
| Labour | D Roche | 808 | |
| Liberal Democrats | P Jones | 482 | |
| Liberal Democrats | R Tofts | 481 | |
| Liberal Democrats | J Evans | 478 | |
| Turnout | | | 29.8% |
| Conservative win (new seat) | | | |
| Conservative win (new seat) | | | |
| Conservative win (new seat) | | | |

=== Plymstock Radford ===
Location of Plymstock Radford ward

Plymstock Radford 2003
| Party | Candidate | Votes | % |
|---|---|---|---|
| Conservative | K Foster | 1,208 | |
| Conservative | W Foster | 1,156 | |
| Conservative | M Leaves | 1,128 | |
| Labour | R Dodd | 1,123 | |
| Labour | J Clynch | 1,062 | |
| Labour | W Wraight | 844 | |
| Liberal Democrats | C Burrows | 500 | |
| UKIP | R Bullock | 452 | |
| UKIP | A Skuse | 414 | |
| UKIP | D McCallum | 408 | |
| Liberal Democrats | M Chandler | 405 | |
| Liberal Democrats | S Kendrick | 372 | |
| Turnout | | | 34.2% |
| Conservative win (new seat) | | | |
| Conservative win (new seat) | | | |
| Conservative win (new seat) | | | |

=== St Budeaux ===
Location of St Budeaux ward

St Budeaux 2003
| Party | Candidate | Votes | % |
|---|---|---|---|
| Labour | G Wheeler | 1,560 | |
| Labour | C Blackburn | 1,475 | |
| Labour | D Williams | 1,426 | |
| Conservative | H Plymsol | 520 | |
| Conservative | P Crolla | 513 | |
| Liberal Democrats | R McSweeney | 449 | |
| Conservative | M White | 421 | |
| Liberal Democrats | G Hirst | 379 | |
| Liberal Democrats | M Gallagher | 371 | |
| Turnout | | | 24.9% |
| Labour win (new seat) | | | |
| Labour win (new seat) | | | |
| Labour win (new seat) | | | |

=== St Peter and the Waterfront ===
Location of St Peter and the Waterfront ward

St Peter and the Waterfront 2003
| Party | Candidate | Votes | % |
|---|---|---|---|
| Labour | M King | 1,040 | |
| Labour | T Wildy | 963 | |
| Labour | V Hiromeris | 958 | |
| Conservative | F Brimacombe | 728 | |
| Conservative | A Angel | 670 | |
| Conservative | E Shillabeer | 588 | |
| Liberal Democrats | H Stone | 535 | |
| Liberal Democrats | J Newton | 475 | |
| Liberal Democrats | T Wickett | 434 | |
| Plymouth Party | K Kelway | 365 | |
| Plymouth Party | J Broughton | 264 | |
| Plymouth Party | S Billows | 242 | |
| Green | F Williamson | 172 | |
| Independent | S Ellis | 118 | |
| Turnout | | | 27.8% |
| Labour win (new seat) | | | |
| Labour win (new seat) | | | |
| Labour win (new seat) | | | |

=== Southway ===
Location of Southway ward

Southway 2003
| Party | Candidate | Votes | % |
|---|---|---|---|
| Labour | D Camp | 1,996 | |
| Labour | J Kirk | 1,728 | |
| Labour | D Weekes | 1,620 | |
| Conservative | E Willey | 836 | |
| Conservative | E Dawson | 732 | |
| Conservative | J Plymsol | 731 | |
| Liberal Democrats | T O'Connor | 372 | |
| Liberal Democrats | C Curry | 333 | |
| Liberal Democrats | B Yardley | 292 | |
| Turnout | | | 27.8% |
| Labour win (new seat) | | | |
| Labour win (new seat) | | | |
| Labour win (new seat) | | | |

=== Stoke ===
Location of Stoke ward

Stoke 2003
| Party | Candidate | Votes | % |
|---|---|---|---|
| Labour | M Fletcher | 1,128 | |
| Labour | G Shears | 1,045 | |
| Labour | D Haydon | 1,007 | |
| Conservative | C Pascoe | 935 | |
| Conservative | Y Dawson | 926 | |
| Conservative | G Monaghan | 877 | |
| Liberal Democrats | H Guy | 506 | |
| Liberal Democrats | S Guy | 469 | |
| Liberal Democrats | N Wickett | 422 | |
| Green | J Cavanagh | 287 | |
| Plymouth Party | I Fleming | 178 | |
| Plymouth Party | K Woodward | 170 | |
| Turnout | | | 29.0% |
| Labour win (new seat) | | | |
| Labour win (new seat) | | | |
| Labour win (new seat) | | | |

=== Sutton and Mount Gould ===
Location of Sutton and Mount Gould ward

Sutton and Mount Gould 2003
| Party | Candidate | Votes | % |
|---|---|---|---|
| Labour | J Nelder | 1,470 | |
| Labour | M Aspinall | 1,452 | |
| Labour | E Rennie | 1,337 | |
| Liberal Democrats | C Brown | 521 | |
| Liberal Democrats | P York | 492 | |
| Conservative | J Parry | 489 | |
| Conservative | R Welchman | 486 | |
| Conservative | J White | 472 | |
| Liberal Democrats | G Nye | 429 | |
| Green | T Mitchell | 195 | |
| Plymouth Party | D Kelway | 159 | |
| Plymouth Party | R Brierley | 127 | |
| Socialist Alliance | R Manning | 74 | |
| Socialist Alliance | E Peonides | 69 | |
| Socialist Alliance | P Tozer | 48 | |
| Turnout | | | 28.0% |
| Labour win (new seat) | | | |
| Labour win (new seat) | | | |
| Labour win (new seat) | | | |
