= 1983 Plymouth City Council election =

1983 UK local government election

← 1979	5 May 1983	1987 →

All 60 seats in the Plymouth City Council 31 seats needed for a majority
- Turnout: 45.3%

	First party	Second party	Third party
Party	Conservative	Labour	Ind. Conservative
Last election	33 seats, 49.9%	26 seats, 41.1%	1 seat
Seats won	34	23	3
Seat change	▲1	▼3	▲2
Popular vote	34,407	24,413	2,261
Percentage	43.2%	30.6%	2.8%
Swing	▼6.7%	▼10.5%	▼0.9%
- Map showing the results of the 1983 Plymouth City Council elections.
Council control before election
Conservative
Council control after election
Conservative

The 1983 Plymouth City Council election took place on 5 May 1983 to elect members of Plymouth City Council in Devon, England. This was on the same day as other local elections. The Conservative Party retained control of the council, which it had held since its creation in 1973.

== Overall results ==
1983 Plymouth City Council Election
Party	Seats	Gains	Losses	Net gain/loss	Seats %	Votes %	Votes	+/−
Conservative	34	3	2	▲1	56.7	43.2	34,407	▼6.7
Labour	23	0	3	▼3	38.3	30.6	24,413	▼10.5
Ind. Conservative	3	2	0	▲2	0.0	2.8	2,261	▼0.9
Alliance	0	0	0	Steady	0.0	22.4	17,820	▲20.7
Ecology	0	0	0	Steady	0.0	3.8	810	New
Total	60						79,711	

== Ward results ==
=== Budshead (3 seats) ===
Location of Budshead ward

Budshead (3 seats)
Party	Candidate	Votes	%
Labour	E. Thomas	1,685	
Labour	R. Simmonds	1,589	
Labour	C. Payne	1,554	
Conservative	G. Sorby	821	
Conservative	H. Palmer	779	
Alliance	W. Harris	770	
Alliance	W. Cornish	764	
Conservative	A. O'Dowd	763	
Alliance	A. Ford	761	
Turnout			38.7%
Labour hold			
Labour hold			
Labour hold			

=== Compton (3 seats) ===
Location of Compton ward

Compton (3 seats)
Party	Candidate	Votes	%
Conservative	G. Creber	2,599	
Conservative	R. Ray	2,532	
Conservative	G. Sloggett	2,522	
Alliance	P. Simonds	732	
Alliance	G. Airey	692	
Alliance	W. Jean	659	
Labour	T. Brown	460	
Labour	P. Dufton	456	
Labour	T. Dennell	443	
Ecology	J. Storey	299	
Turnout			48.1%
Conservative hold			
Conservative hold			
Conservative hold			

=== Drake (3 seats) ===
Location of Drake ward

Drake (3 seats)
Party	Candidate	Votes	%
Conservative	D. Mitchell	2,626	
Conservative	J. Thorpe	2,407	
Conservative	T. Savery	2,368	
Alliance	C. Pitt	824	
Alliance	T. Saunders	814	
Alliance	B. Nelson	789	
Labour	B. Blair	774	
Labour	B. Hill	723	
Labour	P. Barclay	664	
Turnout			43.6%
Conservative hold			
Conservative hold			
Conservative hold			

=== Efford (3 seats) ===
Location of Efford ward

Efford (3 seats)
Party	Candidate	Votes	%
Labour	R. King	1,884	
Labour	G. Draper	1,655	
Conservative	C. Stanbury	1,438	
Labour	H. Welch	1,394	
Conservative	R. Jillard	1,366	
Conservative	M. Leaves	1,343	
Alliance	E. Dodd	686	
Alliance	G. Pedrick	643	
Turnout			48.9%
Labour hold			
Labour hold			
Conservative gain from Labour			

=== Eggbuckland (3 seats) ===
Location of Eggbuckland ward

Eggbuckland (3 seats)
Party	Candidate	Votes	%
Conservative	J. Pascoe	2,368	
Conservative	R. Morrell	2,267	
Conservative	D. Mackinem	2,195	
Alliance	B. Coe	1,382	
Labour	F. Glanfield	1,129	
Alliance	J. Goodworth	1,034	
Labour	L. Haines	1,022	
Alliance	H. Hall	971	
Labour	M. Hill	939	
Turnout			52.5%
Conservative hold			
Conservative hold			
Conservative hold			

=== Estover (3 seats) ===
Location of Estover ward

Estover (3 seats)
Party	Candidate	Votes	%
Conservative	T. Jones	2,303	
Conservative	J. Roberts	2,282	
Conservative	M. Lacey	2,254	
Labour	M. Gilbert	1,079	
Labour	L. Smith	1,055	
Labour	P. Kelly	1,054	
Alliance	J. Condon	1,013	
Alliance	D. Ford	947	
Alliance	G. Gardiner	898	
Turnout			43.4%
Conservative hold			
Conservative hold			
Conservative hold			

=== Ham (3 seats) ===
Location of Ham ward

Ham (3 seats)
Party	Candidate	Votes	%
Labour	A. Floyd	1,941	
Labour	W. Glanville	1,689	
Labour	C. Brimblecombe	1,606	
Conservative	C. Mills	927	
Conservative	T. Briggs	904	
Conservative	G. Paz	864	
Alliance	J. Luscombe	773	
Alliance	R. Hitt	698	
Alliance	L. Barron	679	
Turnout			45.5%
Labour hold			
Labour hold			
Labour hold			

=== Honicknowle (3 seats) ===
Location of Honicknowle ward

Honicknowle (3 seats)
Party	Candidate	Votes	%
Labour	P. Whitfield	2,360	
Labour	H. Dolley	2,277	
Labour	J. Ingham	2,203	
Conservative	M. Gray	1,360	
Conservative	A. Jarvis	1,328	
Conservative	M. Schwartz	1,235	
Alliance	G. Whittle	779	
Alliance	K. Jackson	752	
Alliance	B. Thomas	723	
Turnout			47.1%
Labour hold			
Labour hold			
Labour hold			

=== Keyham (3 seats) ===
Location of Keyham ward

Keyham (3 seats)
Party	Candidate	Votes	%
Conservative	H. Fox	1,344	
Conservative	D. Ackland	1,270	
Labour	D. Manley	1,268	
Labour	R. Lemin	1,214	
Labour	G. Lewis	1,194	
Alliance	K. Rawlings	1,183	
Conservative	C. Atkey	1,174	
Alliance	P. Hoy	1,107	
Alliance	T. Martin	1,084	
Turnout			43.7%
Conservative hold			
Conservative gain from Labour			
Labour hold			

=== Mount Gould (3 seats) ===
Location of Mount Gould ward

Mount Gould (3 seats)
Party	Candidate	Votes	%
Conservative	J. Courtney	1,807	
Conservative	E. Thornton	1,676	
Conservative	H. Bates	1,630	
Labour	B. Lamb	1,037	
Labour	A. De Launey	1,006	
Labour	B. Dawe	969	
Alliance	R. Pawley	848	
Alliance	T. Jeffery	838	
Alliance	L. Tall	803	
Turnout			45.1%
Conservative hold			
Conservative hold			
Conservative hold			

=== Plympton Erle (3 seats) ===
Location of Plympton Erle ward

Plympton Erle (3 seats)
Party	Candidate	Votes	%
Conservative	J. Mills	2,009	
Conservative	A. Wright	1,959	
Conservative	J. Richards	1,939	
Alliance	D. Hart	826	
Alliance	G. Pedrick	816	
Alliance	D. Thomas	769	
Labour	J. Fildew	537	
Labour	J. Bonney	465	
Labour	H. Faulds	441	
Turnout			36.3%
Conservative hold			
Conservative hold			
Conservative hold			

=== Plympton St Mary (3 seats) ===
Location of Plympton St Mary ward

Plympton St Mary (3 seats)
Party	Candidate	Votes	%
Ind. Conservative	P. Radmore	2,261	
Ind. Conservative	J. Philpotts	1,681	
Ind. Conservative	P. Humber	1,448	
Conservative	M. Parkinson	927	
Conservative	O. Hughes	894	
Alliance	L. Finn	844	
Conservative	J. Boyett	825	
Alliance	J. Sharples	765	
Alliance	K. Pedrick	705	
Labour	E. Bunkin	447	
Labour	P. Bunkin	427	
Labour	W. Toms	417	
Turnout			52.2%
Ind. Conservative hold			
Ind. Conservative gain from Conservative			
Ind. Conservative gain from Conservative			

=== Plymstock Dunstone (3 seats) ===
Location of Plymstock Dunstone ward

Plymstock Dunstone (3 seats)
Party	Candidate	Votes	%
Conservative	D. Dicker	2,528	
Conservative	P. Hocken	2,402	
Conservative	D. Viney	2,321	
Alliance	A. Robins	669	
Alliance	J. Robins	659	
Alliance	S. Williams	645	
Labour	G. Payne	572	
Labour	D. Perrin	424	
Labour	M. Wright	399	
Turnout			43.1%
Conservative hold			
Conservative hold			
Conservative hold			

=== Plymstock Radford (3 seats) ===
Location of Plymstock Radford ward

Plymstock Radford (3 seats)
Party	Candidate	Votes	%
Conservative	C. Easton	2,416	
Conservative	O. Kendall	2,037	
Conservative	O. Kendall	1,955	
Alliance	R. Loxley	925	
Alliance	D. Tice	807	
Alliance	P. Hyde	766	
Labour	W. Williamson	547	
Labour	P. Blackburn	522	
Labour	B. Hendy	485	
Ecology	S. Shaw	338	
Turnout			50.1%
Conservative hold			
Conservative hold			
Conservative hold			

=== Southway (3 seats) ===
Location of Southway ward

Southway (3 seats)
Party	Candidate	Votes	%
Labour	R. Scott	1,678	
Labour	W. Evans	1,652	
Labour	J. Jones	1,553	
Conservative	M. Gibson	1,234	
Conservative	P. Birrell	1,221	
Conservative	S. Sullivan	1,134	
Alliance	C. Goodwins	813	
Alliance	D. Goodwins	716	
Alliance	J. Bowen	692	
Turnout			39.1%
Labour hold			
Labour hold			
Labour hold			

=== St Budeax (3 seats) ===
Location of St Budeax ward

St Budeax (3 seats)
Party	Candidate	Votes	%
Labour	R. Bishop	1,742	
Labour	I. Rosevear	1,628	
Labour	C. Bishop	1,525	
Alliance	H. Luscombe	1,310	
Alliance	W. Gallagher	1,118	
Conservative	A. Griffiths	1,049	
Conservative	D. Macmillan	1,047	
Conservative	R. Moiser	1,004	
Alliance	M. Williams	942	
Turnout			48.9%
Labour hold			
Labour hold			
Labour hold			

=== St Peter (3 seats) ===
Location of St Peter ward

St Peter (3 seats)
Party	Candidate	Votes	%
Labour	R. Curry	1,490	
Labour	G. Clinick	1,472	
Labour	J. Leppard	1,203	
Conservative	J. Farrage	756	
Conservative	E. Brock	738	
Conservative	W. Turner	731	
Alliance	G. Burns	600	
Alliance	R. Goodison	582	
Alliance	W. Moule	537	
Turnout			33.9%
Labour hold			
Labour hold			
Labour hold			

=== Stoke (3 seats) ===
Location of Stoke ward

Stoke (3 seats)
Party	Candidate	Votes	%
Conservative	C. Pascoe	2,323	
Conservative	J. Howe	2,180	
Conservative	C. Wilbraham	2,164	
Alliance	K. Hunter	940	
Alliance	D. Hunter	938	
Alliance	J. Cock	877	
Labour	L. Huckett	876	
Labour	M. Sheaff	824	
Labour	D. Smith	810	
Ecology	D. Lloyd	173	
Turnout			44.4%
Conservative hold			
Conservative hold			
Conservative hold			

=== Sutton (3 seats) ===
Location of Sutton ward

Sutton (3 seats)
Party	Candidate	Votes	%
Labour	F. Freeman	1,426	
Labour	J. Finnigan	1,384	
Conservative	F. Brimacombe	1,353	
Labour	S. Cresswell	1,346	
Conservative	S. Hole	1,255	
Conservative	M. Glanville	1,235	
Alliance	P. York	890	
Alliance	D. Edmonds	728	
Alliance	J. Byatt	699	
Turnout			41.7%
Labour hold			
Labour hold			
Conservative gain from Labour			

=== Trelawny (3 seats) ===
Location of Trelawny ward

Trelawny (3 seats)
Party	Candidate	Votes	%
Conservative	R. Mahoney	2,219	
Conservative	A. Parish	2,216	
Conservative	T. Drean	2,190	
Labour	P. Floyd	1,481	
Labour	J. Sewell	1,124	
Labour	C. Ryan	1,109	
Alliance	S. Parry	1,013	
Alliance	P. Pratt	905	
Alliance	J. House	812	
Turnout			60.0%
Conservative hold			
Conservative hold			
Conservative hold			
