= 1991 Plymouth City Council election =

1991 UK local government election

← 1987	2 May 1991	1995 →

All 60 seats in the Plymouth City Council 31 seats needed for a majority
	First party	Second party
Party	Labour	Conservative
Last election	19 seats, 31.7%	31 seats, 51.7%
Seats won	41	19
Seat change	▲22	▼12
Popular vote	41,401	31,669
Percentage	44.1%	33.2%
Swing	▲12.4%	▼18.5%
- Map showing the results of the 1991 Plymouth City Council elections.
Council control before election
Conservative
Council control after election
Labour

The 1991 Plymouth City Council election took place on 2 May 1991 to elect members of Plymouth City Council in Devon, England. This was on the same day as other local elections. The Labour Party gained control of the council from the Conservative Party, who had held it since its creation in 1973.

== Overall results ==
1991 Plymouth City Council Election
Party	Seats	Gains	Losses	Net gain/loss	Seats %	Votes %	Votes	+/−
Labour	41	22	0	▲22	31.7	43.8	41,401	▲16.2
Conservative	19	0	12	▼12	68.3	33.5	31,669	▼4.3
Liberal Democrats	0	0	10	▼10	0.0	16.7	15,774	▼14.4
SDP	0	0	0	Steady	0.0	6.1	5,767	New
Total	60						94,611	

== Ward results ==
=== Budshead (3 seats) ===
Location of Budshead ward

Budshead (3 seats)
Party	Candidate	Votes	%
Labour	C. Payne	2,752	
Labour	R. Simmonds	2,744	
Labour	T. Coleman	2,590	
SDP	P. Rowe	572	
SDP	L. Rowe	571	
Conservative	K. Banks	557	
Conservative	G. Horler	541	
Conservative	J. Mahony	523	
Liberal Democrats	M. Gallagher	394	
SDP	P. Stanner	389	
Liberal Democrats	W. Villagio	368	
Liberal Democrats	S. Hipkiss	345	
Turnout			50.9%
Labour hold			
Labour gain from Liberal Democrats			
Labour hold			

=== Compton (3 seats) ===
Location of Compton ward

Compton (3 seats)
Party	Candidate	Votes	%
Conservative	T. Savery	2,232	
Conservative	P. Wood	2,168	
Conservative	M. Chapman	2,164	
Labour	J. Burton	972	
Labour	H. Watson	963	
Labour	P. Ingham	963	
Liberal Democrats	G. Airey	891	
Liberal Democrats	A. McKelvie	781	
Liberal Democrats	T. Longworth	738	
Turnout			50.6%
Conservative hold			
Conservative hold			
Conservative hold			

=== Drake (3 seats) ===
Location of Drake ward

Drake (3 seats)
Party	Candidate	Votes	%
Conservative	V. Pengelly	1,891	
Labour	C. Burgess	1,872	
Labour	E. Colley	1,830	
Labour	G. Payne	1,818	
Conservative	J. Thorpe	1,725	
Conservative	S. Hole	1,709	
Liberal Democrats	J. Longworth	743	
Liberal Democrats	R. Blank	742	
Liberal Democrats	M. Flippance	724	
Turnout			48.8%
Conservative hold			
Labour gain from Conservative			
Labour gain from Conservative			

=== Efford (3 seats) ===
Location of Efford ward

Efford (3 seats)
Party	Candidate	Votes	%
Labour	I. Tuffin	2,679	
Labour	G. Draper	2,645	
Labour	H. Welch	2,397	
Conservative	C. Stanbury	1,637	
Conservative	K. Banks	1,591	
Conservative	M. Leaves	1,547	
Liberal Democrats	R. Vosper	1,427	
Liberal Democrats	J. Cornish	1,388	
Turnout			54.3%
Labour hold			
Labour hold			
Labour gain from Conservative			

=== Eggbuckland (3 seats) ===
Location of Eggbuckland ward

Eggbuckland (3 seats)
Party	Candidate	Votes	%
Labour	D. Bray	2,526	
Labour	P. Lee	2,347	
Labour	R. Gachagan	2,273	
Conservative	J. Pascoe	2,062	
Conservative	R. Morrell	2,016	
Conservative	D. Mackinem	1,866	
Liberal Democrats	A. Nelmes	1,181	
Liberal Democrats	B. Coe	1,113	
Liberal Democrats	J. Byatt	975	
Turnout			57.7%
Labour gain from Conservative			
Labour gain from Conservative			
Labour gain from Conservative			

=== Estover (3 seats) ===
Location of Estover ward

Estover (3 seats)
Party	Candidate	Votes	%
Conservative	T. Jones	2,285	
Conservative	V. Hoy	2,249	
Conservative	K. Wigens	2,217	
Labour	C. Demuth	1,983	
Labour	B. Young	1,924	
Labour	A. Lemin	1,923	
SDP	R. Goodson	1,080	
SDP	F. Tapscott	1,077	
SDP	I. Lucas	990	
Turnout			50.1%
Conservative hold			
Conservative hold			
Conservative hold			

=== Ham (3 seats) ===
Location of Ham ward

Ham (3 seats)
Party	Candidate	Votes	%
Labour	B. Rider	2,885	
Labour	K. Prowse	2,723	
Labour	T. Evans	2,650	
Conservative	B. Gibson	742	
Conservative	Y. Horler	686	
Conservative	L. Noden	645	
SDP	D. Mound	584	
SDP	M. Yardley	580	
Turnout			51.2%
Labour hold			
Labour hold			
Labour hold			

=== Honicknowle (3 seats) ===
Location of Honicknowle ward

Honicknowle (3 seats)
Party	Candidate	Votes	%
Labour	J. Ingham	3,440	
Labour	P. Whitfield	3,372	
Labour	R. Burton	3,118	
Conservative	J. Brimacombe	967	
Conservative	E. Hughes	893	
Conservative	J. Wallace	886	
Liberal Democrats	M. Evens	733	
SDP	P. Murphy	435	
SDP	B. Tapscott	409	
Turnout			52.8%
Labour hold			
Labour hold			
Labour hold			

=== Keyham (3 seats) ===
Location of Keyham ward

Keyham (3 seats)
Party	Candidate	Votes	%
Labour	M. Sheaff	2,019	
Labour	R. Lemin	1,979	
Labour	T. Smith	1,913	
SDP	H. Furzeman	1,506	
SDP	I. Higgins	1,432	
SDP	L. Woodcock	1,425	
Conservative	M. Derbyshire	753	
Conservative	M. Orchard	654	
Conservative	R. Williams	628	
Turnout			52.0%
Labour gain from Liberal Democrats			
Labour gain from Liberal Democrats			
Labour gain from Liberal Democrats			

=== Mount Gould (3 seats) ===
Location of Mount Gould ward

Mount Gould (3 seats)
Party	Candidate	Votes	%
Labour	V. Grout	1,960	
Labour	A. Hall	1,941	
Labour	P. Coyle	1,897	
Conservative	B. Carter	1,163	
Conservative	H. George	1,117	
Conservative	J. Kingdom	1,112	
Liberal Democrats	A. Cameron	727	
Liberal Democrats	S. Knight	557	
Liberal Democrats	K. Robinson	529	
Turnout			50.2%
Labour gain from Liberal Democrats			
Labour gain from Liberal Democrats			
Labour gain from Liberal Democrats			

=== Plympton Erle (3 seats) ===
Location of Plympton Erle ward

Plympton Erle (3 seats)
Party	Candidate	Votes	%
Conservative	J. Mills	2,297	
Conservative	A. Wright	2,227	
Conservative	J. Richards	2,227	
Liberal Democrats	L. Howorth	1,446	
Liberal Democrats	M. Williams	1,421	
Liberal Democrats	J. Peacock	1,409	
Labour	V. Burns	1,374	
Labour	J. Williams	1,306	
Labour	A. Dymond	1,250	
Turnout			44.9%
Conservative hold			
Conservative hold			
Conservative hold			

=== Plympton St Mary (3 seats) ===
Location of Plympton St Mary ward

Plympton St Mary (3 seats)
Party	Candidate	Votes	%
Conservative	J. Stopporton	2,421	
Conservative	O. Hughes	2,265	
Conservative	Gary Streeter	2,250	
Liberal Democrats	G. Morris	1,625	
Liberal Democrats	P. Howard	1,545	
Liberal Democrats	C. Rendle	1,488	
Labour	D. Mills	996	
Labour	P. Smith	957	
Labour	T. Nally	956	
Turnout			54.8%
Conservative hold			
Conservative hold			
Conservative hold			

=== Plymstock Dunstone (3 seats) ===
Location of Plymstock Dunstone ward

Plymstock Dunstone (3 seats)
Party	Candidate	Votes	%
Conservative	D. Dicker	2,948	
Conservative	P. Hocken	2,843	
Conservative	D. Viney	2,758	
Liberal Democrats	C. Forte	1,317	
Liberal Democrats	S. Harding	1,299	
Liberal Democrats	G. Unwin	1,264	
Labour	H. Biles	1,142	
Labour	W. Smale	1,049	
Labour	T. Woodman	961	
Turnout			52.7%
Conservative hold			
Conservative hold			
Conservative hold			

=== Plymstock Radford (3 seats) ===
Location of Plymstock Radford ward

Plymstock Radford (3 seats)
Party	Candidate	Votes	%
Conservative	C. Easton	2,348	
Conservative	I. Bowyer	1,954	
Conservative	K. Moyse	1,953	
Labour	R. Earl	1,310	
Labour	P. Allan	1,217	
Labour	J. Nicholson	1,132	
Liberal Democrats	B. Grundy	1,000	
Liberal Democrats	W. Maddick	898	
Liberal Democrats	A. Dudson	874	
Turnout			53.3%
Conservative hold			
Conservative hold			
Conservative hold			

=== Southway (3 seats) ===
Location of Southway ward

Southway (3 seats)
Party	Candidate	Votes	%
Labour	W. Ainsworth	2,989	
Labour	D. Camp	2,940	
Labour	J. Jones	2,874	
Conservative	M. Gibson	1,111	
Conservative	A. Marshall-Clarke	1,004	
Liberal Democrats	J. Benson	1,003	
Conservative	A. Sloggett	945	
Turnout			47.3%
Labour hold			
Labour hold			
Labour hold			

=== St Budeax (3 seats) ===
Location of St Budeax ward

St Budeax (3 seats)
Party	Candidate	Votes	%
Labour	W. Wraight	2,109	
Labour	J. Coyle	2,093	
Labour	J. Payne	2,030	
SDP	H. Luscombe	1,590	
SDP	A. Ford	1,152	
Conservative	E. Deacon	801	
Liberal Democrats	W. Gallagher	770	
Conservative	M. Campbell	684	
Conservative	F. Sullivan	681	
Turnout			52.1%
Labour gain from Liberal Democrats			
Labour gain from Liberal Democrats			
Labour gain from Liberal Democrats			

=== St Peter (3 seats) ===
Location of St Peter ward

St Peter (3 seats)
Party	Candidate	Votes	%
Labour	S. Bellamy	2,190	
Labour	P. Kelly	2,087	
Labour	M. Riggs	2,076	
Conservative	J. Parry	718	
Conservative	C. Robinson	691	
Conservative	P. Smith	625	
Liberal Democrats	J. Bristow-Watson	453	
Liberal Democrats	D. Charlesworth	427	
Liberal Democrats	P. York	405	
Turnout			44.4%
Labour hold			
Labour hold			
Labour hold			

=== Stoke (3 seats) ===
Location of Stoke ward

Stoke (3 seats)
Party	Candidate	Votes	%
Labour	D. Millar	2,031	
Labour	T. Martin	2,025	
Labour	J. Millar	1,937	
Conservative	P. Nicholson	1,818	
Conservative	C. Pascoe	1,815	
Conservative	G. Monahan	1,613	
Liberal Democrats	J. Dean	1,146	
Liberal Democrats	J. Evans	1,074	
Liberal Democrats	P. York	983	
Turnout			52.2%
Labour gain from Conservative			
Labour gain from Conservative			
Labour gain from Conservative			

=== Sutton (3 seats) ===
Location of Sutton ward

Sutton (3 seats)
Party	Candidate	Votes	%
Labour	J. Finnigan	2,265	
Labour	J. Nelder	2,123	
Labour	C. Mavin	2,084	
Conservative	F. Brimacombe	1,121	
Conservative	J. Ellis	953	
Conservative	M. Greenhalgh	836	
Liberal Democrats	G. Pedrick	484	
Liberal Democrats	P. Jones	480	
Liberal Democrats	S. Longworth	469	
Turnout			50.3%
Labour hold			
Labour hold			
Labour hold			

=== Trelawny (3 seats) ===
Location of Trelawny ward

Trelawny (3 seats)
Party	Candidate	Votes	%
Labour	C. Brimblecombe	1,907	
Labour	J. Blower	1,902	
Labour	H. Davey	1,873	
Conservative	D. Ackland	1,797	
Conservative	P. Nicholson	1,778	
Conservative	V. Williams	1,754	
Liberal Democrats	M. Hazell	434	
Liberal Democrats	S. Guy	415	
Liberal Democrats	S. McConnell	401	
Turnout			62.8%
Labour gain from Conservative			
Labour gain from Conservative			
Labour gain from Conservative			
