= John Richard Dobell =

Conservative politicician and lawyer

- Born: December 1931; Plymouth, Devon, England
- Died: 22 May 2019 (aged 87); Plymouth, Devon, England
- Education: Sherborne School
- Occupations: Councillor; chief whip; solicitor; company director
- Father: Edgar Stanbury Dobell

John Richard Dobell (December 1931 – 22 May 2019) was a British Conservative Party politician and lawyer.

== Early life and education ==
Dobell was born in Plymouth, England, in December 1931 to Marjorie Joyce Sandover and Edgar Stanbury Dobell. He attended Sherborne School from 1945 to 1948.

== Career ==
Dobell was chairman of the Sutton Conservative Association, chief whip of the Conservatives on the Plymouth City Council, and chairman of the Planning Committee of Plymouth City Council. He was twice elected to the Plymouth City Council as a Conservative councillor representing the ward of Crownhill: in the elections of 1973 and 1976. In 1977, he called for a special meeting of Executive Council to question Alan Clark about his attitudes to the National Front. Clark's personal feelings ("Gach!") were published in Alan Clark Diaries. Dobell was the first to interrupt Clark's 1982 speech in Crownhill – Clark's first speech through Central Office and first to be interrupted by his own supporters.

Dobell was director of Midtarget Property Management Limited (a company founded in 1988) from before 14 May 1991 to 5 May 1993. He was then director of Joymalgh Limited (a company founded in 1977) from before 1 January 1993 to 29 May 2003.

== Death and funeral ==
Dobell died on 22 May 2019 in Plymouth, England. His funeral was announced in The Herald and held at St Andrew's Church, Plymouth on 17 June.
