= 1979 Plymouth City Council election =

1979 UK local government election

← 1976	3 May 1979	1983 →

All 60 seats in the Plymouth City Council 31 seats needed for a majority
- Turnout: 73.1%

	First party	Second party	Third party
Party	Conservative	Labour	Ind. Conservative
Last election	39 seats, 51.9%	27 seats, 39.6%	39 seats, 51.9%
Seats won	33	26	1
Seat change	▼6	▼1	▲1
Popular vote	63,524	52,360	4,751
Percentage	49.9%	41.1%	3.7%
Swing	▼2.0%	▲1.5%	New
- Map showing the results of the 1979 Plymouth City Council elections.
Council control before election
Conservative
Council control after election
Conservative

The 1979 Plymouth City Council election took place on 3 May 1979 to elect members of Plymouth City Council in Devon, England. This was on the same day as other local elections. It was the first election to be held under new ward boundaries. The Conservative Party retained control of the council, which it had held since its creation in 1973.

== Overall results ==
1979 Plymouth City Council Election
Party	Seats	Gains	Losses	Net gain/loss	Seats %	Votes %	Votes	+/−
Conservative	33	n/a	n/a	▼6	55.0	49.9	63,524	▼2.0
Labour	26	n/a	n/a	▼1	43.3	41.1	52,360	▲1.5
Liberal	0	n/a	n/a	n/a	1.7	3.5	4,465	▼0.7
National Front	0	n/a	n/a	n/a	0.0	1.8	2,438	New
Ind. Conservative	1	n/a	n/a	▲1	0.0	3.7	4,751	New
Total	60						127,384	

== Ward results ==
=== Budshead (3 seats) ===
Location of Budshead ward

Budshead (3 seats)
Party	Candidate	Votes	%
Labour	T. Keast	3,741	
Labour	E. Thomas	3,720	
Labour	R. Simmonds	3,598	
Conservative	H. Hughes	2,271	
Conservative	D. Macmillan	2,049	
Conservative	B. Yardley	2,003	
Turnout			66.6%
Labour win (new seat)			
Labour win (new seat)			
Labour win (new seat)			

=== Compton (3 seats) ===
Location of Compton ward

Compton (3 seats)
Party	Candidate	Votes	%
Conservative	G. Creber	4,466	
Conservative	R. Ray	4,299	
Conservative	F. Milligan	4,292	
Labour	B. Sabel	1,457	
Labour	P. Lovell	1,450	
Labour	P. Ingham	1,417	
Turnout			68.6%
Conservative win (new seat)			
Conservative win (new seat)			
Conservative win (new seat)			

=== Drake (3 seats) ===
Location of Drake ward

Drake (3 seats)
Party	Candidate	Votes	%
Conservative	D. Mitchell	4,461	
Conservative	J. Thorpe	3,837	
Conservative	T. Savery	3,768	
Labour	N. Crowley	2,138	
Labour	S. Caylor	2,083	
Labour	E. Clinick	2,079	
Liberal	J. Robins	953	
Liberal	R. Pawley	948	
National Front	P. Rouse	175	
Turnout			73.3%
Conservative win (new seat)			
Conservative win (new seat)			
Conservative win (new seat)			

=== Efford (3 seats) ===
Location of Efford ward

Efford (3 seats)
Party	Candidate	Votes	%
Labour	R. King	3,083	
Labour	G. Draper	2,907	
Labour	J. Leppard	2,837	
Conservative	J. Richards	2,443	
Conservative	E. Smith	2,348	
Conservative	E. Willcock	2,182	
National Front	J. Pocock	201	
Turnout			71.4%
Labour win (new seat)			
Labour win (new seat)			
Labour win (new seat)			

=== Eggbuckland (3 seats) ===
Location of Eggbuckland ward

Eggbuckland (3 seats)
Party	Candidate	Votes	%
Conservative	J. Pascoe	3,736	
Conservative	D. Mackinem	3,460	
Conservative	R. Morrell	3,388	
Labour	D. Tranter	2,392	
Labour	M. Hughes	2,386	
Labour	D. Knott	2,337	
Turnout			74.6%
Conservative win (new seat)			
Conservative win (new seat)			
Conservative win (new seat)			

=== Estover (3 seats) ===
Location of Estover ward

Estover (3 seats)
Party	Candidate	Votes	%
Conservative	T. Jones	3,664	
Conservative	R. Elliot	3,564	
Conservative	M. Lacey	3,530	
Labour	E. Evans	2,292	
Labour	W. Leahy	2,285	
Labour	M. Gilbert	2,220	
Turnout			71.6%
Conservative win (new seat)			
Conservative win (new seat)			
Conservative win (new seat)			

=== Ham (3 seats) ===
Location of Ham ward

Ham (3 seats)
Party	Candidate	Votes	%
Labour	A. Floyd	3,622	
Labour	K. Glanville	3,375	
Labour	W. Glanville	3,284	
Conservative	J. Farrage	2,002	
Conservative	V. Hingston	1,957	
Conservative	G. Lawrence	1,941	
National Front	D. Merry	215	
Turnout			71.4%
Labour win (new seat)			
Labour win (new seat)			
Labour win (new seat)			

=== Honicknowle (3 seats) ===
Location of Honicknowle ward

Honicknowle (3 seats)
Party	Candidate	Votes	%
Labour	P. Whitfield	4,187	
Labour	H. Dolley	4,010	
Labour	J. Ingham	3,690	
Conservative	M. Brown	3,035	
Conservative	T. Johnson	2,907	
Conservative	A. Jarvis	2,793	
National Front	D. Stentiford	261	
Turnout			77.2%
Labour win (new seat)			
Labour win (new seat)			
Labour win (new seat)			

=== Keyham (3 seats) ===
Location of Keyham ward

Keyham (3 seats)
Party	Candidate	Votes	%
Labour	D. Manley	2,853	
Labour	R. Lemin	2,850	
Conservative	H. Fox	2,774	
Labour	D. Yeates	2,726	
Conservative	M. Glanville	2,622	
Conservative	E. Pengelly	2,612	
National Front	J. Blake	301	
Turnout			66.9%
Labour win (new seat)			
Labour win (new seat)			
Labour win (new seat)			

=== Mount Gould (3 seats) ===
Location of Mount Gould ward

Mount Gould (3 seats)
Party	Candidate	Votes	%
Conservative	J. Courtney	3,500	
Conservative	E. Thornton	3,331	
Conservative	R. Thornton	3,291	
Labour	L. Hill	2,388	
Labour	J. Finnigan	2,302	
Labour	W. Payne	2,226	
Turnout			58.7%
Conservative win (new seat)			
Conservative win (new seat)			
Conservative win (new seat)			

=== Plympton Erle (3 seats) ===
Location of Plympton Erle ward

Plympton Erle (3 seats)
Party	Candidate	Votes	%
Conservative	J. Mills	3,327	
Conservative	A. Wright	3,297	
Conservative	J. Richards	3,145	
Labour	J. Fildew	1,777	
Labour	C. Bishop	1,505	
Labour	J. Sewell	1,482	
Ind. Conservative	J. Kingdom	1,001	
Ind. Conservative	R. Cornforth	741	
Turnout			76.4%
Conservative win (new seat)			
Conservative win (new seat)			
Conservative win (new seat)			

=== Plympton St Mary (3 seats) ===
Location of Plympton St Mary ward

Plympton St Mary (3 seats)
Party	Candidate	Votes	%
Ind. Conservative	P. Radmore	2,949	
Conservative	M. Parkinson	2,207	
Conservative	K. Perry	2,193	
Conservative	D. Thompson	1,624	
Ind. Conservative	L. Speare	1,618	
Labour	W. Gross	1,498	
Labour	A. De Launey	1,448	
Labour	S. Clark	1,274	
Liberal	D. Tice	1,063	
Turnout			96.2%
Ind. Conservative win (new seat)			
Conservative win (new seat)			
Conservative win (new seat)			

=== Plymstock Dunstone (3 seats) ===
Location of Plymstock Dunstone ward

Plymstock Dunstone (3 seats)
Party	Candidate	Votes	%
Conservative	D. Dicker	4,461	
Conservative	D. Viney	4,197	
Conservative	P. Hocken	4,144	
Labour	E. Hill	1,507	
Labour	J. Cowan	1,400	
Labour	W. Williamson	1,385	
Turnout			76.5%
Conservative win (new seat)			
Conservative win (new seat)			
Conservative win (new seat)			

=== Plymstock Radford (3 seats) ===
Location of Plymstock Radford ward

Plymstock Radford (3 seats)
Party	Candidate	Votes	%
Conservative	R. Easton	3,639	
Conservative	C. Easton	3,524	
Conservative	O. Kendall	2,956	
Labour	T. Telford	1,544	
Labour	M. Telford	1,531	
Labour	L. Haines	1,244	
Liberal	R. Loxley	1,152	
Liberal	J. Byatt	1,084	
Liberal	C. Tice	1,002	
Turnout			76.7%
Conservative win (new seat)			
Conservative win (new seat)			
Conservative win (new seat)			

=== Southway (3 seats) ===
Location of Southway ward

Southway (3 seats)
Party	Candidate	Votes	%
Labour	W. Evans	3,467	
Labour	R. Scott	3,226	
Labour	J. Jones	3,123	
Conservative	R. Billings	2,723	
Conservative	M. Lippell	2,632	
Conservative	H. Hennessey	2,486	
National Front	J. Price	136	
Turnout			74.5%
Labour win (new seat)			
Labour win (new seat)			
Labour win (new seat)			

=== St Budeax (3 seats) ===
Location of St Budeax ward

St Budeax (3 seats)
Party	Candidate	Votes	%
Labour	R. Bishop	3,032	
Labour	H. Luscombe	3,015	
Labour	I. Rosevear	2,974	
Conservative	E. Deacon	2,553	
Conservative	T. Docking	2,505	
Conservative	G. Howe	2,437	
National Front	L. Beresford-Walker	149	
Turnout			71.7%
Labour win (new seat)			
Labour win (new seat)			
Labour win (new seat)			

=== St Peter (3 seats) ===
Location of St Peter ward

St Peter (3 seats)
Party	Candidate	Votes	%
Labour	I. Lowe	3,324	
Labour	H. Clinnick	3,294	
Labour	J. Luce	3,217	
Conservative	G. Baker	2,034	
Conservative	E. Diggle	1,915	
Conservative	T. Wilks	1,817	
National Front	E. Lynch	228	
Turnout			63.1%
Labour win (new seat)			
Labour win (new seat)			
Labour win (new seat)			

=== Stoke (3 seats) ===
Location of Stoke ward

Stoke (3 seats)
Party	Candidate	Votes	%
Conservative	C. Pascoe	4,148	
Conservative	P. Washbourn	4,043	
Conservative	C. Wilbraham	3,984	
Labour	L. Huckett	2,676	
Labour	T. Caylor	2,462	
Labour	W. Hennah	2,416	
National Front	D. Radmore	478	
Turnout			72.5%
Conservative win (new seat)			
Conservative win (new seat)			
Conservative win (new seat)			

=== Sutton (3 seats) ===
Location of Sutton ward

Sutton (3 seats)
Party	Candidate	Votes	%
Labour	F. Johnson	2,695	
Labour	F. Freeman	2,665	
Labour	J. Lobb	2,591	
Conservative	G. Blades	2,455	
Conservative	J. Hingston	2,216	
Conservative	W. Turner	2,040	
Liberal	P. York	862	
Liberal	G. Pedrick	639	
Liberal	K. Rawlings	600	
National Front	J. Williams	140	
Turnout			66.5%
Labour win (new seat)			
Labour win (new seat)			
Labour win (new seat)			

=== Trelawny (3 seats) ===
Location of Trelawny ward

Trelawny (3 seats)
Party	Candidate	Votes	%
Conservative	G. Jinks	3,625	
Conservative	A. Parish	3,583	
Conservative	W. Thompson	3,249	
Labour	P. Floyd	2,737	
Labour	L. Goldstone	2,356	
Labour	T. Saunders	2,261	
Ind. Conservative	K. Gardiner	801	
National Front	S. Merry	154	
Turnout			88.6%
Conservative win (new seat)			
Conservative win (new seat)			
Conservative win (new seat)			
