= 1976 Plymouth City Council election =

1976 UK local government election

← 1973	6 May 1976	1979 →

All 66 seats in the Plymouth City Council 34 seats needed for a majority

	First party	Second party
Party	Conservative	Labour
Last election	37 seats, 47.9%	29 seats, 45.9%
Seats won	39	27
Seat change	▲2	▼2
Popular vote	41,659	31,838
Percentage	51.9%	39.6%
Swing	▲4.0%	▼6.3%
Council control before election
Conservative
Council control after election
Conservative

The 1976 Plymouth City Council election took place on 6 May 1976 to elect members of Plymouth City Council in England. This was on the same day as other local elections. Voting took place across 22 wards, each electing 3 Councillors. The Conservative Party retained control of the Council after winning a majority of seats.

== Overall results ==
1976 Plymouth City Council Election
Party	Seats	Gains	Losses	Net gain/loss	Seats %	Votes %	Votes	+/−
Conservative	39	2	0	▲2	59.1	51.9	41,659	▲4.0
Labour	27	0	2	▼2	40.9	39.6	31,838	▼5.0
Liberal	0	0	0	Steady	0.0	4.2	3,389	▼2.0
Independent	0	0	0	Steady	0.0	3.3	2,638	New
Independent Labour	0	0	0	Steady	0.0	0.6	453	New
Residents	0	0	0	Steady	0.0	0.4	326	New
Total	66						80,303	

== Ward results ==
=== Compton (3 seats) ===
Compton (3 seats)
Party	Candidate	Votes	%
Conservative	G. Creber	2,717	
Conservative	F. Milligan	2,639	
Conservative	R. Ray	2,611	
Labour	P. Lovell	671	
Labour	W. Bond	603	
Independent	P. Symonds	571	
Labour	B. Wilson	554	
Turnout			46.8%
Conservative hold			
Conservative hold			
Conservative hold			

=== Crownhill (3 seats) ===
Crownhill (3 seats)
Party	Candidate	Votes	%
Conservative	J. Pascoe	3,382	
Conservative	R. Morrell	3,281	
Conservative	J. Dobell	3,264	
Labour	M. Hughes	1,438	
Labour	R. Fraser	1,369	
Labour	P. Knight	1,353	
Turnout			44.2%
Conservative hold			
Conservative hold			
Conservative hold			

=== Drake (3 seats) ===
Drake (3 seats)
Party	Candidate	Votes	%
Conservative	D. Mitchell	2,581	
Conservative	T. Savery	2,398	
Conservative	N. Pengelly	2,387	
Labour	W. Pepper	857	
Labour	R. Lemin	825	
Labour	J. Whitby	799	
Turnout			47.3%
Conservative hold			
Conservative hold			
Conservative hold			

=== Efford (3 seats) ===
Efford (3 seats)
Party	Candidate	Votes	%
Labour	F. Stott	1,923	
Labour	R. King	1,866	
Labour	G. Draper	1,751	
Conservative	J. Richards	1,566	
Conservative	S. Luke	1,446	
Conservative	E. Smith	1,377	
Turnout			49.0%
Labour hold			
Labour hold			
Labour hold			

=== Ernesettle (3 seats) ===
Ernesettle (3 seats)
Party	Candidate	Votes	%
Labour	J. Roberts	1,810	
Labour	C. Brimblecombe	1,661	
Conservative	C. Pascoe	1,576	
Conservative	J. Small	1,565	
Labour	D. Drake	1,560	
Conservative	G. Annear	1,550	
Turnout			47.8%
Labour hold			
Labour hold			
Conservative gain from Labour			

=== Ford (3 seats) ===
Ford (3 seats)
Party	Candidate	Votes	%
Conservative	H. Fox	1,905	
Conservative	M. Glanville	1,696	
Labour	B. Furzeman	1,683	
Labour	B. Batchelor	1,659	
Labour	C. Moiser	1,564	
Conservative	R. Ingham	1,541	
Turnout			49.2%
Conservative gain from Labour			
Conservative hold			
Labour hold			

=== Honicknowle (3 seats) ===
Honicknowle (3 seats)
Party	Candidate	Votes	%
Labour	P. Whitfield	2,390	
Labour	W. Nicholson	2,199	
Labour	H. Dolley	2,192	
Conservative	R. Wheeler	1,552	
Conservative	H. Palmer	1,505	
Conservative	M. Brown	1,492	
Turnout			51.6%
Labour hold			
Labour hold			
Labour hold			

=== Mount Gould (3 seats) ===
Mount Gould (3 seats)
Party	Candidate	Votes	%
Conservative	J. Courtney	1,776	
Conservative	E. Thornton	1,743	
Conservative	R. Thornton	1,690	
Labour	B. Clarke	1,204	
Labour	K. Glanville	1,189	
Labour	T. Saunders	1,155	
Liberal	C. Smith	782	
Liberal	J. Davey	772	
Turnout			49.3%
Conservative hold			
Conservative hold			
Conservative hold			

=== Pennycross (3 seats) ===
Pennycross (3 seats)
Party	Candidate	Votes	%
Labour	A. Floyd	2,534	
Labour	W. Glanville	2,184	
Labour	I. Flett	2,046	
Conservative	K. Gardiner	1,474	
Conservative	C. Holman	1,297	
Conservative	E. Donald	1,197	
Turnout			50.4%
Labour hold			
Labour hold			
Labour hold			

=== Plympton Erle (3 seats) ===
Plympton Erle (3 seats)
Party	Candidate	Votes	%
Conservative	J. Mills	2,079	
Conservative	A. Wright	2,057	
Conservative	J. Richards	2,041	
Labour	J. Fildew	1,019	
Labour	V. Williams	983	
Labour	J. Leppard	852	
Turnout			41.7%
Conservative hold			
Conservative hold			
Conservative hold			

=== Plympton St Mary (3 seats) ===
Plympton St Mary (3 seats)
Party	Candidate	Votes	%
Conservative	L. Speare	2,207	
Conservative	R. Radmore	2,138	
Conservative	W. Tregenna-Piggott	2,046	
Labour	W. Gross	950	
Labour	S. De Launey	873	
Labour	A. De Launey	862	
Turnout			46.1%
Conservative hold			
Conservative hold			
Conservative hold			

=== Plymstock Dunstone (3 seats) ===
Plymstock Dunstone (3 seats)
Party	Candidate	Votes	%
Conservative	I. Langdon	2,738	
Conservative	D. Dicker	2,672	
Conservative	D. Viney	2,669	
Liberal	D. Finch	717	
Labour	E. Hill	642	
Labour	J. Cowan	636	
Labour	T. Caylor	585	
Independent	J. Macmillan	526	
Turnout			48.0%
Conservative hold			
Conservative hold			
Conservative hold			

=== Plymstock Radford (3 seats) ===
Plymstock Radford (3 seats)
Party	Candidate	Votes	%
Conservative	R. Easton	1,905	
Conservative	C. Easton	1,861	
Conservative	O. Kendall	1,654	
Labour	L. Haines	928	
Liberal	N. Williams	754	
Liberal	D. Tice	695	
Labour	F. Morrish	689	
Liberal	A. Vacquier	664	
Labour	W. Williamson	638	
Turnout			47.6%
Conservative hold			
Conservative hold			
Conservative hold			

=== St Andrew (3 seats) ===
St Andrew (3 seats)
Party	Candidate	Votes	%
Conservative	A. Glinn	1,612	
Conservative	G. Blades	1,578	
Conservative	W. Turner	1,468	
Labour	E. Clinnick	1,052	
Labour	J. Ingham	1,023	
Labour	P. Ingham	963	
Independent	W. Worth	442	
Turnout			44.1%
Conservative hold			
Conservative hold			
Conservative hold			

=== St Aubyn (3 seats) ===
St Aubyn (3 seats)
Party	Candidate	Votes	%
Labour	D. Yeates	1,363	
Labour	F. Long	1,337	
Labour	L. Goldstone	1,335	
Conservative	M. Gregory	1,231	
Conservative	B. Foster	1,183	
Conservative	J. Ashford	1,165	
Turnout			36.4%
Labour hold			
Labour hold			
Labour hold			

=== St Budeax (3 seats) ===
St Budeax (3 seats)
Party	Candidate	Votes	%
Labour	G. Tucker	2,360	
Labour	R. Hockey	2,196	
Labour	R. Bishop	2,178	
Conservative	T. Docking	1,521	
Conservative	P. Glazsher	1,484	
Conservative	I. Forster	1,419	
Turnout			50.1%
Labour hold			
Labour hold			
Labour hold			

=== St Peter (3 seats) ===
St Peter (3 seats)
Party	Candidate	Votes	%
Labour	I. Lowe	1,585	
Labour	J. Luce	1,496	
Labour	H. Clinnick	1,430	
Conservative	E. Brock	748	
Conservative	F. Angle	655	
Conservative	V. Douglas-Green	611	
Independent Labour	R. Blank	453	
Residents	F. Guy	326	
Independent	R. Nicholls	250	
Independent	H. Welch	130	
Turnout			41.2%
Labour hold			
Labour hold			
Labour hold			

=== Stoke (3 seats) ===
Stoke (3 seats)
Party	Candidate	Votes	%
Conservative	C. Wilbraham	1,689	
Conservative	P. Washbourn	1,679	
Conservative	W. Howe	1,630	
Labour	J. Cock	1,020	
Labour	L. Barron	983	
Labour	L. Huckett	896	
Liberal	B. Yardley	497	
Liberal	J. Sowden	410	
Turnout			44.7%
Conservative hold			
Conservative hold			
Conservative hold			

=== Sutton (3 seats) ===
Sutton (3 seats)
Party	Candidate	Votes	%
Labour	F. Johnson	1,650	
Labour	F. Freeman	1,432	
Labour	J. Lobb	1,512	
Conservative	R. Hooper	1,035	
Conservative	J. King	924	
Conservative	M. Parkinson	885	
Liberal	P. York	639	
Turnout			42.1%
Labour hold			
Labour hold			
Labour hold			

=== Tamerton (3 seats) ===
Tamerton (3 seats)
Party	Candidate	Votes	%
Labour	W. Evans	2,044	
Labour	R. Scott	1,861	
Labour	J. Jones	1,840	
Conservative	M. Lippell	1,620	
Conservative	E. Diggle	1,468	
Conservative	W. Rowe	1,463	
Turnout			42.9%
Conservative hold			
Conservative hold			
Conservative hold			

=== Trelawny (3 seats) ===
Trelawny (3 seats)
Party	Candidate	Votes	%
Conservative	A. Parish	2,608	
Conservative	W. Thompson	2,415	
Conservative	G. Jinks	2,391	
Labour	B. Colgan	989	
Labour	S. Caylor	959	
Labour	W. King	924	
Independent	J. Newell	849	
Turnout			53.2%
Conservative hold			
Conservative hold			
Conservative hold			

=== Whitleigh (3 seats) ===
Whitleigh (3 seats)
Party	Candidate	Votes	%
Conservative	T. Johnson	2,137	
Conservative	T. Jones	2,023	
Conservative	M. Lacey	1,949	
Labour	H. Luscombe	1,726	
Labour	R. Sprague	1,631	
Labour	G. Wellings	1,561	
Turnout			45.2%
Conservative hold			
Conservative hold			
Conservative hold			
