= 1973 Plymouth City Council election =

1973 UK local government election

7 June 1973	1976 →

All 66 seats in the Plymouth City Council 34 seats needed for a majority
	First party	Second party
Party	Conservative	Labour
Seats won	37	29
Popular vote	28,943	27,721
Percentage	47.9%	45.9%
Council control after election
Conservative

The 1973 Plymouth City Council election took place on 7 June 1973 to elect members of Plymouth City Council in England. This was on the same day as other local elections. Voting took place across 22 wards, each electing 3 Councillors. Following the Local Government Act 1972, this was the first election to the new non-metropolitan district council for Plymouth, which came into being on 1 April the following year. The Conservative Party took control of the Council after winning a majority of seats.

== Overall results ==
1973 Plymouth City Council Election
Party	Seats	Gains	Losses	Net gain/loss	Seats %	Votes %	Votes	+/−
Conservative	37	n/a	n/a	n/a	56.1	47.9	28,943	n/a
Labour	29	n/a	n/a	n/a	43.9	45.9	27,721	n/a
Liberal	0	n/a	n/a	n/a	0.0	6.2	3,760	n/a
Total	66						60,424	

== Ward results ==
=== Compton (3 seats) ===
Compton (3 seats)
Party	Candidate	Votes	%
Conservative	G. Creber	2,055	
Conservative	F. Milligan	2,031	
Conservative	R. Ray	1,998	
Labour	P. Lovell	531	
Labour	J. Jones	501	
Labour	T. Saunders	481	
Turnout			32.8%
Conservative win (new seat)			
Conservative win (new seat)			
Conservative win (new seat)			

=== Crownhill (3 seats) ===
Crownhill (3 seats)
Party	Candidate	Votes	%
Conservative	J. Pascoe	2,139	
Conservative	R. Morrell	2,128	
Conservative	J. Dobell	2,126	
Labour	F. Gould	1,163	
Labour	H. Trevan	1,103	
Labour	W. Payne	1,035	
Turnout			34.1%
Conservative win (new seat)			
Conservative win (new seat)			
Conservative win (new seat)			

=== Drake (3 seats) ===
Drake (3 seats)
Party	Candidate	Votes	%
Conservative	D. Mitchell	1,878	
Conservative	T. Savery	1,789	
Conservative	N. Pengelly	1,734	
Labour	F. Young	835	
Labour	F. Dent	802	
Labour	K. Cheffers	773	
Turnout			35.8%
Conservative win (new seat)			
Conservative win (new seat)			
Conservative win (new seat)			

=== Efford (3 seats) ===
Efford (3 seats)
Party	Candidate	Votes	%
Labour	F. Stott	1,881	
Labour	R. King	1,792	
Labour	G. Draper	1,784	
Conservative	D. Macmillan	802	
Conservative	E. Richardson	786	
Conservative	R. Brown	739	
Liberal	J. Snell	535	
Turnout			44.1%
Labour win (new seat)			
Labour win (new seat)			
Labour win (new seat)			

=== Ernesettle (3 seats) ===
Ernesettle (3 seats)
Party	Candidate	Votes	%
Labour	J. Roberts	1,481	
Labour	D. Drake	1,321	
Labour	C. Brimblecombe	1,259	
Conservative	J. Small	1,056	
Conservative	M. Coyte	1,031	
Conservative	J. Inglesby	1,013	
Turnout			%
Labour win (new seat)			
Labour win (new seat)			
Labour win (new seat)			

=== Ford (3 seats) ===
Ford (3 seats)
Party	Candidate	Votes	%
Labour	B. Batchelor	1,553	
Conservative	H. Fox	1,435	
Labour	B. Furzeman	1,409	
Labour	V. Venn	1,348	
Conservative	G. Blades	1,347	
Conservative	E. Willcock	1,264	
Turnout			40.7%
Labour win (new seat)			
Conservative win (new seat)			
Labour win (new seat)			

=== Honicknowle (3 seats) ===
Honicknowle (3 seats)
Party	Candidate	Votes	%
Labour	P. Whitfield	2,102	
Labour	W. Nicholson	2,002	
Labour	H. Dolley	1,997	
Conservative	H. Washbrook	692	
Conservative	W. Rowe	692	
Conservative	G. Switzer	687	
Turnout			35.2%
Labour win (new seat)			
Labour win (new seat)			
Labour win (new seat)			

=== Mount Gould (3 seats) ===
Mount Gould (3 seats)
Party	Candidate	Votes	%
Conservative	E. Thornton	1,525	
Conservative	J. Courtney	1,525	
Conservative	R. Thornton	1,521	
Labour	D. Knott	1,183	
Labour	R. Bulland	1,151	
Labour	K. Pierce	1,148	
Liberal	G. Gladwell	631	
Turnout			42.4%
Conservative win (new seat)			
Conservative win (new seat)			
Conservative win (new seat)			

=== Pennycross (3 seats) ===
Pennycross (3 seats)
Party	Candidate	Votes	%
Labour	A. Floyd	2,123	
Labour	W. Glanville	1,969	
Labour	I. Flett	1,829	
Conservative	K. Gardiner	1,154	
Conservative	R. Goodall	1,121	
Conservative	D. Chapman	1,024	
Turnout			42.2%
Labour win (new seat)			
Labour win (new seat)			
Labour win (new seat)			

=== Plympton Erle (3 seats) ===
Plympton Erle (3 seats)
Party	Candidate	Votes	%
Conservative	J. Mills	949	
Conservative	J. Richards	881	
Conservative	A. Wright	870	
Labour	J. Fildew	603	
Labour	E. Carn	508	
Labour	K. Strang	463	
Turnout			25.7%
Conservative win (new seat)			
Conservative win (new seat)			
Conservative win (new seat)			

=== Plympton St Mary (3 seats) ===
Plympton St Mary (3 seats)
Party	Candidate	Votes	%
Conservative	C. Smith	1,334	
Conservative	W. Tregenna-Piggott	1,258	
Conservative	R. Radmore	1,230	
Labour	J. Beresford	832	
Labour	W. Gross	812	
Labour	A. De Launey	805	
Turnout			31.0%
Conservative win (new seat)			
Conservative win (new seat)			
Conservative win (new seat)			

=== Plymstock Dunstone (3 seats) ===
Plymstock Dunstone (3 seats)
Party	Candidate	Votes	%
Conservative	A. Everett	1,703	
Conservative	I. Langdon	1,684	
Conservative	D. Dicker	1,635	
Liberal	R. Snell	1,014	
Labour	B. Hills	445	
Labour	R. Fraser	380	
Labour	M. Browning	307	
Turnout			40.8%
Conservative win (new seat)			
Conservative win (new seat)			
Conservative win (new seat)			

=== Plymstock Radford (3 seats) ===
Plymstock Radford (3 seats)
Party	Candidate	Votes	%
Conservative	R. Easton	1,430	
Conservative	R. Easton	1,367	
Conservative	D. Thompson	1,219	
Labour	E. Hill	753	
Liberal	N. Williams	685	
Labour	W. Williamson	590	
Labour	J. Leppard	552	
Turnout			40.2%
Conservative win (new seat)			
Conservative win (new seat)			
Conservative win (new seat)			

=== St Andrew (3 seats) ===
St Andrew (3 seats)
Party	Candidate	Votes	%
Conservative	A. Glinn	1,568	
Conservative	P. Bond	1,495	
Conservative	W. Turner	1,465	
Labour	L. Hill	1,254	
Labour	M. Telford	1,219	
Labour	P. Knight	1,192	
Turnout			38.5%
Conservative win (new seat)			
Conservative win (new seat)			
Conservative win (new seat)			

=== St Aubyn (3 seats) ===
St Aubyn (3 seats)
Party	Candidate	Votes	%
Labour	F. Long	1,319	
Labour	D. Yeates	1,313	
Labour	L. Goldstone	1,254	
Conservative	W. Wilks	881	
Conservative	J. Ashford	784	
Conservative	W. Harris	772	
Turnout			29.4%
Labour win (new seat)			
Labour win (new seat)			
Labour win (new seat)			

=== St Budeax (3 seats) ===
St Budeax (3 seats)
Party	Candidate	Votes	%
Labour	G. Tucker	2,168	
Labour	R. Hockey	2,054	
Labour	R. Bishop	2,020	
Conservative	M. Hoblin	1,300	
Conservative	J. Lee	1,224	
Conservative	J. Rennie	1,152	
Turnout			44.7%
Labour win (new seat)			
Labour win (new seat)			
Labour win (new seat)			

=== St Peter (3 seats) ===
St Peter (3 seats)
Party	Candidate	Votes	%
Labour	I. Lowe	1,657	
Labour	J. Luce	1,641	
Labour	R. Blank	1,578	
Conservative	R. Baker	622	
Conservative	J. Munton	616	
Conservative	P. Duigman	608	
Turnout			33.3%
Labour win (new seat)			
Labour win (new seat)			
Labour win (new seat)			

=== Stoke (3 seats) ===
Stoke (3 seats)
Party	Candidate	Votes	%
Conservative	P. Washbourn	1,538	
Conservative	C. Wilbraham	1,522	
Conservative	W. Howe	1,462	
Labour	J. Cock	1,055	
Labour	H. Williams	1,027	
Labour	P. May	973	
Turnout			36.1%
Conservative win (new seat)			
Conservative win (new seat)			
Conservative win (new seat)			

=== Sutton (3 seats) ===
Sutton (3 seats)
Party	Candidate	Votes	%
Labour	W. Piper	1,486	
Labour	H. Lobb	1,443	
Labour	F. Johnson	1,403	
Liberal	R. Hawke	895	
Conservative	C. Ryall	665	
Conservative	C. Flay	551	
Conservative	J. Corrigan	514	
Turnout			40.5%
Labour win (new seat)			
Labour win (new seat)			
Labour win (new seat)			

=== Tamerton (3 seats) ===
Tamerton (3 seats)
Party	Candidate	Votes	%
Labour	W. Evans	1,402	
Labour	R. Scott	1,376	
Labour	J. Jones	1,337	
Conservative	A. Williams	922	
Conservative	P. Birrell	888	
Conservative	T. Docking	835	
Turnout			28.0%
Conservative win (new seat)			
Conservative win (new seat)			
Conservative win (new seat)			

=== Trelawny (3 seats) ===
Trelawny (3 seats)
Party	Candidate	Votes	%
Conservative	G. Jinks	1,975	
Conservative	A. Parish	1,958	
Conservative	W. Thompson	1,911	
Labour	B. Mills	773	
Labour	K. Glanville	749	
Labour	R. Oliver	723	
Turnout			35.3%
Conservative win (new seat)			
Conservative win (new seat)			
Conservative win (new seat)			

=== Whitleigh (3 seats) ===
Whitleigh (3 seats)
Party	Candidate	Votes	%
Conservative	T. Johnson	1,320	
Conservative	S. Blane	1,201	
Conservative	T. Jones	1,200	
Labour	H. Luscombe	1,122	
Labour	E. Thomas	1,106	
Labour	H. Welch	956	
Turnout			28.9%
Conservative win (new seat)			
Conservative win (new seat)			
Conservative win (new seat)			
