= Edgar Stanbury Dobell =

British lawyer

- Born: 26 February 1896; Plymouth, Devon, England
- Died: 27 July 1961 (aged 65); Plymouth, Devon, England
- Occupations: Solicitor; registrar; executive
- Height: 193 cm (6 ft 4 in)
- Spouse: Marjorie Joyce Sandover
- Children: 3 (including John Richard)

Edgar Stanbury Dobell (26 February 1896 – 27 July 1961) was a British lawyer and businessman.

Dobell was the eldest son of Eva Ellen Stanbury and John Pearse Dobell, a solicitor. While a student at law, he was a member of the Plymouth, Stonehouse and Devonport Law Students' Debating Society. From 1915 to 1919, he served in the Coldstream Guards. He was once mentioned in dispatches.

Dobell was articled to J. P. Dobell, of Plymouth. In 1919, he passed the intermediate examinations for entry into the Law Society of England and Wales. He passed the final examinations the following year. In 1932, Dobell was vice-president of the Seven O'Clock Regulars Swimming Club. He served as president of the Plymouth Law Society in 1936. His father (John Pearse Dobell) had served as president in 1912 and his brother (David Ireland Dobell) would later serve in 1971.

In 1931, Dobell married Marjorie Joyce Sandover in Plymouth, England. They had two daughters and one son (John Richard Dobell).

From 1948 to 1954, Dobell was the director and vice-president of Plymouth Argyle F.C.. In 1953, he and Sir Hubert Ashton produced Sporting Fanfare, a light programme for the BBC. In 1954, he oversaw Plymouth Argyle F.C.'s complete middle-west and coast-to-coast tour of the United States, which included a day-by-day account of the players' experiences during the tour through the all round coverage of local sports writers.
