= 1987 Plymouth City Council election =

1987 UK local government election

- 7 May 1987

All 60 seats in the Plymouth City Council 31 seats needed for a majority

	First party	Second party	Third party
Party	Conservative	Labour	Alliance
Last election	34 seats, 43.2%	23 seats, 30.6%	0 seats, 22.4%
Seats won	31	19	10
Seat change	▼3	▼4	▲10
Popular vote	35,136	25,617	30,779
Percentage	51.7%	31.7%	19.7%
Swing	▼5.4%	▼3.0%	▲10.7%
- Map showing the results of the 1987 Plymouth City Council elections.
Council control before election
Conservative
Council control after election
Conservative

The 1987 Plymouth City Council election took place on 7 May 1987 to elect members of Plymouth City Council in Devon, England. This was on the same day as other local elections. The Conservative Party retained control of the council, which it had held since its creation in 1973.

== Overall results ==
1987 Plymouth City Council Election
Party	Seats	Gains	Losses	Net gain/loss	Seats %	Votes %	Votes	+/−
Conservative	31	3	6	▼3	51.7	37.8	35,136	▼5.4
Labour	19	1	5	▼4	31.7	27.6	25,617	▼3.0
Alliance	10	10	0	▲10	16.7	33.1	30,779	▲10.7
Green	0	0	0	Steady	0.0	1.5	1,440	▼2.3
Total	60						92,972	

== Ward results ==
=== Budshead (3 seats) ===
Location of Budshead ward

Budshead (3 seats)
Party	Candidate	Votes	%
Labour	E. Thomas	1,758	
Alliance	C. Brampton	1,712	
Labour	C. Payne	1,685	
Labour	R. Simmonds	1,668	
Alliance	D. Goodwins	1,654	
Alliance	J. Aarons	1,654	
Conservative	M. Gibson	765	
Conservative	S. Medland	695	
Conservative	L. Moss	660	
Turnout			46.9%
Labour hold			
Alliance gain from Labour			
Labour hold			

=== Compton (3 seats) ===
Location of Compton ward

Compton (3 seats)
Party	Candidate	Votes	%
Conservative	T. Savery	2,537	
Conservative	G. Sloggett	2,519	
Conservative	P. Wood	2,377	
Alliance	M. Bayne	1,390	
Alliance	B. Clarke	1,375	
Alliance	J. Knight	1,248	
Labour	M. Seabrook	463	
Labour	T. Brown	450	
Labour	P. Lee	443	
Green	C. Farr	311	
Turnout			54.9%
Conservative hold			
Conservative hold			
Conservative hold			

=== Drake (3 seats) ===
Location of Drake ward

Drake (3 seats)
Party	Candidate	Votes	%
Conservative	D. Mitchell	2,285	
Conservative	S. Hole	1,991	
Conservative	J. Thorpe	1,991	
Alliance	J. Robins	1,318	
Alliance	D. Nash	1,300	
Alliance	R. Lethaby	1,211	
Labour	R. Cooksley	1,091	
Labour	L. Haines	1,016	
Labour	L. Jarvie	893	
Green	G. Grindrod	292	
Turnout			53.0%
Conservative hold			
Conservative hold			
Conservative hold			

=== Efford (3 seats) ===
Location of Efford ward

Efford (3 seats)
Party	Candidate	Votes	%
Labour	R. King	1,843	
Labour	G. Draper	1,667	
Conservative	C. Stanbury	1,624	
Conservative	M. Leaves	1,534	
Labour	B. Dawe	1,500	
Conservative	K. Banks	1,496	
Alliance	P. Howard	1,084	
Alliance	J. Cornish	1,024	
Alliance	M. Cload	1,018	
Turnout			52.2%
Labour hold			
Labour hold			
Conservative hold			

=== Eggbuckland (3 seats) ===
Location of Eggbuckland ward

Eggbuckland (3 seats)
Party	Candidate	Votes	%
Conservative	J. Pascoe	2,227	
Conservative	R. Morrell	2,147	
Conservative	D. Mackinem	2,025	
Alliance	B. Coe	1,919	
Alliance	J. Harris	1,823	
Alliance	A. Nelmes	1,783	
Labour	M. Hughes	1,344	
Labour	L. Huckett	1,194	
Labour	P. Williams	1,150	
Turnout			55.6%
Conservative hold			
Conservative hold			
Conservative hold			

=== Estover (3 seats) ===
Location of Estover ward

Estover (3 seats)
Party	Candidate	Votes	%
Conservative	T. Jones	2,419	
Conservative	R. Boyes	2,343	
Conservative	K. Wigens	2,281	
Alliance	A. Ford	2,124	
Alliance	G. Gardiner	2,010	
Alliance	E. Lindley	1,983	
Labour	M. Gilbert	990	
Labour	M. Keane	911	
Labour	D. Camp	888	
Turnout			51.2%
Conservative hold			
Conservative hold			
Conservative hold			

=== Ham (3 seats) ===
Location of Ham ward

Ham (3 seats)
Party	Candidate	Votes	%
Labour	A. Floyd	2,181	
Labour	C. Brimblecombe	1,930	
Labour	B. Hendy	1,823	
Alliance	A. Burdess	1,323	
Alliance	G. Morris	1,275	
Alliance	M. Pike	1,192	
Conservative	M. Baxter	994	
Conservative	P. Gale	920	
Conservative	K. Waterman	880	
Turnout			53.6%
Labour hold			
Labour hold			
Labour hold			

=== Honicknowle (3 seats) ===
Location of Honicknowle ward

Honicknowle (3 seats)
Party	Candidate	Votes	%
Labour	P. Whitfield	2,525	
Labour	J. Ingham	2,487	
Labour	H. Dolley	2,411	
Conservative	D. Kennedy	1,124	
Conservative	A. Ayres	1,064	
Conservative	M. Waterman	1,054	
Alliance	S. Parry	1,034	
Alliance	W. Lea	1,008	
Alliance	J. House	1,002	
Turnout			59.3%
Labour hold			
Labour hold			
Labour hold			

=== Keyham (3 seats) ===
Location of Keyham ward

Keyham (3 seats)
Party	Candidate	Votes	%
Alliance	H. Furzeman	1,546	
Alliance	I. Higgins	1,539	
Alliance	L. Woodcock	1,428	
Labour	A. Bennett	1,372	
Labour	D. Manley	1,295	
Labour	R. Lemin	1,275	
Conservative	H. Fox	1,163	
Conservative	D. Ackland	1,126	
Conservative	R. Johnson	1,075	
Turnout			47.1%
Alliance gain from Conservative			
Alliance gain from Conservative			
Alliance gain from Labour			

=== Mount Gould (3 seats) ===
Location of Mount Gould ward

Mount Gould (3 seats)
Party	Candidate	Votes	%
Alliance	Gary Streeter	1,841	
Alliance	V. Hoy	1,720	
Alliance	A. Pawley	1,664	
Conservative	J. Courtney	1,312	
Conservative	M. Glanville	1,200	
Conservative	J. Wallace	1,136	
Labour	T. Evans	911	
Labour	N. Skinner	874	
Labour	A. Westlake	857	
Turnout			50.7%
Alliance gain from Conservative			
Alliance gain from Conservative			
Alliance gain from Conservative			

=== Plympton Erle (3 seats) ===
Location of Plympton Erle ward

Plympton Erle (3 seats)
Party	Candidate	Votes	%
Conservative	J. Mills	2,178	
Conservative	A. Wright	2,133	
Conservative	J. Richards	2,089	
Alliance	M. Williams	1,861	
Alliance	P. Willcock	1,798	
Alliance	A. Cudmore	1,797	
Labour	J. Fildew	577	
Labour	L. Glover	502	
Labour	P. Johns	501	
Turnout			43.7%
Conservative hold			
Conservative hold			
Conservative hold			

=== Plympton St Mary (3 seats) ===
Location of Plympton St Mary ward

Plympton St Mary (3 seats)
Party	Candidate	Votes	%
Conservative	J. Stopporton	2,398	
Conservative	J. Philpotts	2,297	
Conservative	O. Hughes	2,153	
Alliance	P. Radmore	2,138	
Alliance	M. Hendley	1,961	
Alliance	J. Hendley	1,864	
Labour	D. Mills	518	
Labour	M. Nix	449	
Labour	H. Welch	436	
Turnout			54.4%
Conservative gain from Ind. Conservative			
Conservative gain from Ind. Conservative			
Conservative gain from Ind. Conservative			

=== Plymstock Dunstone (3 seats) ===
Location of Plymstock Dunstone ward

Plymstock Dunstone (3 seats)
Party	Candidate	Votes	%
Conservative	D. Dicker	2,867	
Conservative	D. Viney	2,758	
Conservative	P. Hocken	2,699	
Alliance	J. Woodcock	1,846	
Alliance	E. Willcock	1,766	
Alliance	A. Martin	1,675	
Labour	R. Gachagen	499	
Labour	W. Finn	484	
Labour	G. Payne	466	
Turnout			53.0%
Conservative hold			
Conservative hold			
Conservative hold			

=== Plymstock Radford (3 seats) ===
Location of Plymstock Radford ward

Plymstock Radford (3 seats)
Party	Candidate	Votes	%
Conservative	C. Easton	2,472	
Conservative	S. Radford	2,183	
Conservative	K. Moyse	2,122	
Alliance	R. Snell	1,261	
Alliance	G. Unwin	1,239	
Alliance	J. Byatt	1,208	
Labour	R. Earl	828	
Labour	I. Gasper	637	
Labour	N. Mallett	603	
Turnout			52.9%
Conservative hold			
Conservative hold			
Conservative hold			

=== Southway (3 seats) ===
Location of Southway ward

Southway (3 seats)
Party	Candidate	Votes	%
Labour	R. Scott	1,791	
Labour	W. Evans	1,771	
Labour	J. Jones	1,670	
Alliance	W. Cornish	1,483	
Alliance	D. Elliott	1,482	
Alliance	C. Andrews	1,449	
Conservative	S. Jones	1,348	
Conservative	A. Marshall-Clarke	1,266	
Conservative	A. Sloggett	1,260	
Turnout			44.2%
Labour hold			
Labour hold			
Labour hold			

=== St Budeax (3 seats) ===
Location of St Budeax ward

St Budeax (3 seats)
Party	Candidate	Votes	%
Alliance	B. Luscombe	1,709	
Alliance	J. Luscombe	1,580	
Alliance	W. Gallagher	1,514	
Labour	W. Goffin	1,292	
Labour	S. Cresswell	1,272	
Labour	B. Gilroy	1,193	
Conservative	J. Horswell	1,166	
Conservative	M. Maddock	1,155	
Conservative	F. Sullivan	1,133	
Turnout			48.1%
Alliance gain from Labour			
Alliance gain from Labour			
Alliance gain from Labour			

=== St Peter (3 seats) ===
Location of St Peter ward

St Peter (3 seats)
Party	Candidate	Votes	%
Labour	S. Bellamy	1,744	
Labour	G. Clinick	1,636	
Labour	P. Kelly	1,505	
Alliance	G. Burns	831	
Conservative	M. Chapman	825	
Conservative	J. Mahony	791	
Alliance	K. Pedrick	776	
Conservative	C. Fowler	768	
Alliance	B. Harris	739	
Green	S. Shaw	206	
Turnout			43.6%
Labour hold			
Labour hold			
Labour hold			

=== Stoke (3 seats) ===
Location of Stoke ward

Stoke (3 seats)
Party	Candidate	Votes	%
Conservative	C. Pascoe	2,137	
Conservative	J. Howe	1,928	
Conservative	G. Monahan	1,865	
Alliance	P. Nicholson	1,741	
Alliance	G. Airey	1,589	
Alliance	G. Pedrick	1,471	
Labour	G. Wheeler	1,301	
Labour	S. Smith	1,255	
Labour	M. Wright	1,199	
Green	F. Allen	275	
Turnout			57.3%
Conservative hold			
Conservative hold			
Conservative hold			

=== Sutton (3 seats) ===
Location of Sutton ward

Sutton (3 seats)
Party	Candidate	Votes	%
Labour	J. Finnigan	1,437	
Labour	C. Mavin	1,342	
Labour	J. Nelder	1,338	
Alliance	P. York	1,230	
Alliance	R. Kaye	1,180	
Alliance	R. Goodinson	1,170	
Conservative	P. Bentley	1,163	
Conservative	G. Blades	1,161	
Conservative	R. Browne	1,127	
Turnout			47.8%
Labour hold			
Labour hold			
Labour gain from Conservative			

=== Trelawny (3 seats) ===
Location of Trelawny ward

Trelawny (3 seats)
Party	Candidate	Votes	%
Conservative	R. Mahoney	2,132	
Conservative	T. Drean	2,051	
Conservative	A. Parish	2,026	
Alliance	C. May	1,388	
Alliance	J. Green	1,368	
Alliance	A. McKelvie	1,294	
Labour	J. Blower	1,152	
Labour	N. Brimblecombe	1,049	
Labour	B. Rider	1,025	
Green	T. Barber	356	
Turnout			63.8%
Conservative hold			
Conservative hold			
Conservative hold			
